= 1st Sussex Engineers =

1st Sussex Engineer Volunteers 44th (Home Counties) Divisional Engineers 119 Field Engineer Regiment
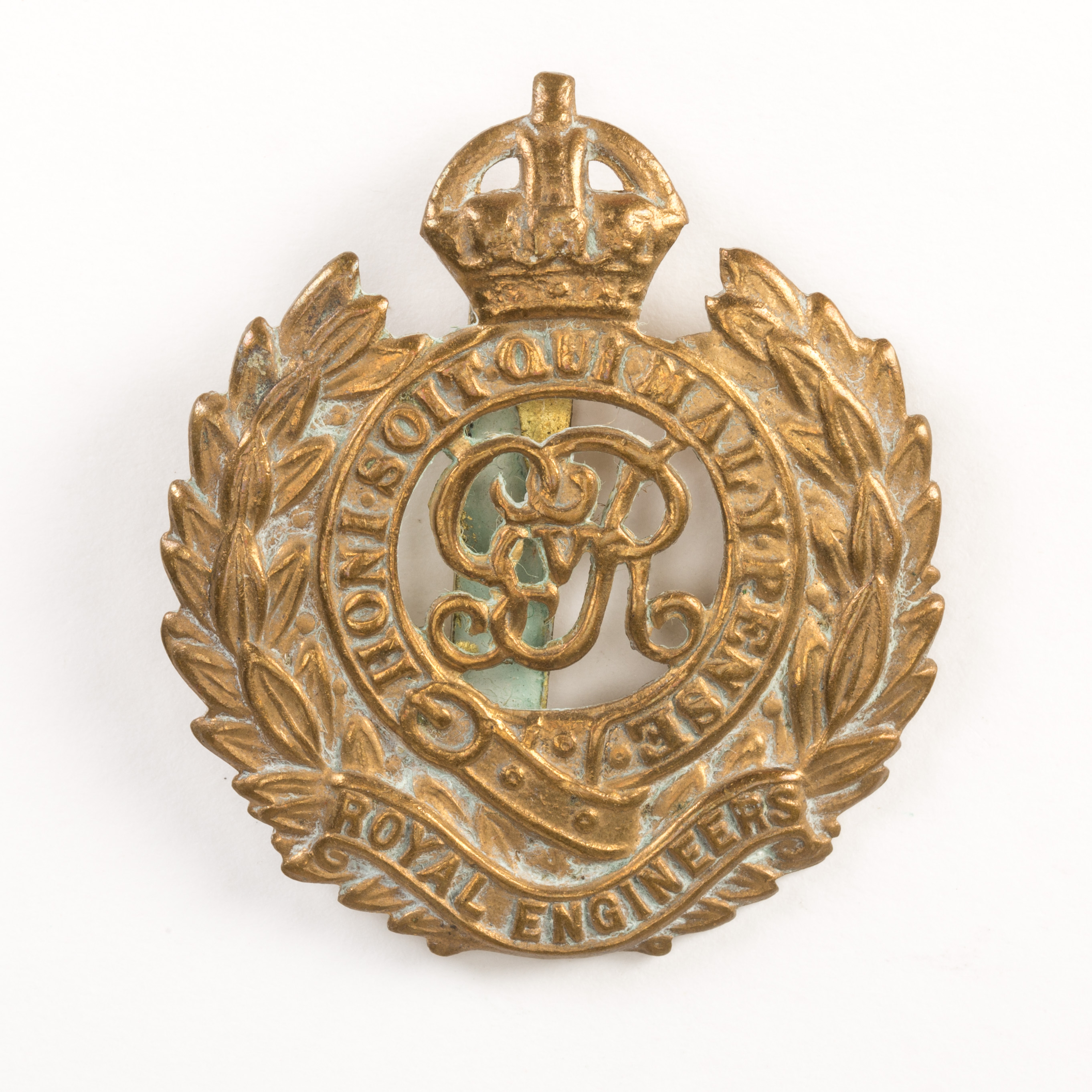
- RE Cap badge (King George V cipher)
- Active: 24 May 1890 – 1 April 1967
- Country: United Kingdom
- Branch: Territorial Army
- Role: Field engineers
- Part of: 44th (Home Counties) Division
- Garrison/HQ: Eastbourne; Brighton
- Nickname: Sussex Sappers
- Engagements: Second Boer War; First World War: Western Front; Salonika; Italy; North Russia; Second World War: Dunkirk; Alamein; Tunisia; Sicily; Italy; Normandy; Rhine; Kohima; Irrawaddy crossing

The 1st Sussex Engineers was a Volunteer unit of Britain's Royal Engineers raised in Eastbourne in 1890. It became the engineer component of the 44th (Home Counties) Division of the Territorial Force, but its units saw action with Regular Army formations on the Western Front, at Salonika and in Italy during the First World War, and in North Russia and Turkey after the war ended. During the Second World War, its units were in the Battle of France and at Alamein, in Sicily, on D Day and the subsequent campaign in North West Europe, including the Rhine crossing. Detached companies fought in Tunisia, Italy, and Burma, where one was involved in the decisive Battle of Kohima and the assault crossing of the Irrawaddy. The unit continued in the postwar Territorial Army until 1967.

== Volunteer Force ==
The enthusiasm for the Volunteer movement following an invasion scare in 1859 saw the creation of many Rifle, Artillery and Engineer Volunteer units composed of part-time soldiers eager to supplement the Regular British Army in time of need. However, it was not until 1890 that an Engineer Volunteer Corps (EVC) was raised in Sussex. Its instigator was George Frederick Chambers, a barrister from Eastbourne, with the support of the Commanding Royal Engineer (CRE) for the South-East District and against opposition from local dignitaries and the 2nd Sussex Artillery Volunteers, who feared competition for recruits in the town. Towards the end of 1889, Chambers called a meeting to get the minimum 60 volunteers required, obtaining 105 names including a complete fife and drum band. The requisition was sent to the War Office, and the 1st Sussex Engineer Volunteer Corps officially came into existence in Eastbourne on 24 May 1890. Initially the company headquarters (HQ) was at Eastbourne Redoubt, then from April 1891 at 38 Commercial Road, Eastbourne. It was attached for administrative purposes to the 1st Middlesex EVC. It formed two additional companies in 1892, B at Newhaven and C at Seaford. From 1892 it was attached to the 1st Hampshire Engineers EVC and then became an independent unit from May 1895.

Frederick Savage, headmaster of Seaford College, was commissioned as a captain in the 1st Sussex EVC in 1891 and formed a Cadet Corps at the school that year. In July 1895 he was promoted to major in command of the 1st Sussex EVC. Further cadet companies were formed at University and St Leonards Collegiate Schools, Hastings, in 1906 and 1907 respectively. D Company of the 1st Sussex EVC was formed at Chalvington in 1896, but attempts the following year to raise three or four more companies were unsuccessful.

=== South Africa ===
After Black Week in December 1899, the Volunteers were invited to send active service units to assist the Regulars in the Second Boer War. From 70 volunteers, the 1st Sussex Engineers selected its detachment of one officer, one sergeant and 25 other ranks to work with the Royal Engineers (RE). They were sworn in on 18 January 1900, underwent training at the RE depot at Chatham, Kent, and embarked at Southampton aboard the Tintagel Castle with similar sections from 11 other EVCs on 10 March. The ship arrived at Cape Town on 31 March where the first duty for the sappers was to unload balloons and gas cylinders for the RE Balloon Section. The Sussex Section was then given its assignment, which was to 23rd Field Company, RE, at Ladysmith. This entailed re-embarking and sailing to Durban, then proceeding by rail via Pietermaritzburg. The section spent three weeks repairing siege damage at Ladysmith, then with 23rd Fd Co it joined 4th Division's advance towards Newcastle. The main job for the sappers was to repair drifts (fords) so that the transport and artillery could cross the numerous rivers, but providing water supplies for the horses was also important. During the four-day Battle of Belfast the sappers were involved in digging trenches and gun positions. The force then drove the Boers out of Lydenburg into the Mauchsberg Mountains, where the sappers were employed to get the guns forward from ridge to ridge. After reaching Kruger Post, the column returned to Lydenburg, where the sappers built a six-span square timber bridge over the Crocodile River, sangars and water supplies.

The Sussex Section was now ordered to return to England, so it was marched back to Machadorp (the only unit on foot in a mounted column) and then went by train to Pretoria. There it assisted 9th Fd Co in laying a pipeline and carried out guards and patrols. After three weeks at Pretoria it was obvious that the Boers were not defeated, and the orders to return home were cancelled. The Sussex Section rejoined 23rd Fd Co at Middelburg, where it was chiefly engaged in manufacturing and erecting corrugated iron blockhouses, but also putting Middelburg Town Hall into a state of defence. Three Sussex sappers died of Enteric fever while at Middelburg, and another four were evacuated home with sickness before the end of the section's term of service.

At the end of March 1901 the first sections of Volunteer sappers were ordered to return home at the completion of their year's service. The Sussex section travelled by train to Durban, then by ship to Cape Town, where the survivors embarked on the St Andrew for Southampton. Before they left Cape Town, the second Sussex Section arrived on the Saxon from England, having been raised (from the enlarged 1st Sussex Engineers) in March. The Boers having adopted prolonged Guerrilla warfare, the second section saw less movement than the first, being chiefly engaged with 9th Fd Co at Naampoort on the blockhouse system. After the end of its year's service the second section embarked on the Roslin Castle at Cape Town on 29 May 1902 and reached Southampton on 18 June.

The wave of patriotism at the time of the Boer War led to the formation of eight more companies for the 1st Sussex Engineers in 1901: E, F and G at Brighton, H and J at Eastbourne, K at Tonbridge in Kent, L and M at Hastings. Shortly afterwards the HQ moved to 40 Junction Road, Eastbourne, with another drill station at Seaford.

== Territorial Force ==
When the Volunteers were subsumed into the new Territorial Force (TF) under the Haldane Reforms of 1908, the 1st Sussex EVC provided the divisional engineers for the TF's Home Counties Division with the following organisation:

Home Counties Divisional Engineers

- HQ and 1st Home Counties Field Company (from E–J Companies) at Commercial Road, Eastbourne (Ordnance Yard, Eastbourne, from September 1910)
- 2nd Home Counties Field Company (from L & M Companies) at Tower Road West, St Leonards-on-Sea with drill stations at Bexhill-on-Sea and Seaford
- Home Counties Divisional Telegraph Company (from E–J Companies) at 23 Gloucester Place, Brighton
  - No 1 Section at Brighton
  - No 2 (Surrey) Section
  - No 3 (Kent) Section
  - No 4 (Middlesex) Section

Nos 2–4 Sections were attached to and largely staffed by the three infantry brigades of the division.

The 1st Sussex also provided (from B & C Companies) the Sussex Fortress Royal Engineers, a single Works Company based at the Drill Hall, Queen's Hall, Broad Street, Seaford, while K Company at Tonbridge formed the basis for the Kent Fortress Royal Engineers. All three cadet corps continued to be affiliated to the Home Counties Divisional Engineers. The Telegraph Company was redesignated a Signals Company in 1911.

== First World War ==
=== Mobilisation ===
The Home Counties Division was on its annual training on Salisbury Plain when mobilisation orders were received on 4 August 1914, and its units returned to their HQs. The Home Counties Divisional RE was embodied on 5 August 1914 under Lt-Col W.F. Cheesewright, who had been its Commander, RE, (CRE) since 12 July 1913. It went to its war station of Dover to work on defences, and then on 24 August to the Home Counties Division's concentration area around Canterbury.

Shortly after the outbreak of war, TF units were invited to volunteer for overseas service. Early in September battalions of the Home Counties Division began to relieve Regular units at Gibraltar, then in October the infantry and artillery of the whole division embarked for garrison service in India. Although it did later receive a number (44th), the Home Counties Division never operated as a formation during the war: its units remained scattered in colonial garrisons or were attached to Indian divisions. The Divisional RE went to France on 21 December 1914 as GHQ Troops for the British Expeditionary Force (BEF) on the Western Front and were later assigned as individual companies to Regular divisions.

Meanwhile, the formation of a reserve or 2nd Line unit was authorised for each 1st Line unit where 60 per cent or more of the men had volunteered for Overseas Service. The titles of these 2nd Line units would be the same as the original, but distinguished by a '2/' prefix. In this way duplicate battalions, brigades and divisions were created, mirroring those TF formations being sent overseas. The 2nd Home Counties Division was one of the first organised, as soon as the 1st Line had departed for India. Later 3rd Line units were formed to supply drafts to the 1st and 2nd Lines.

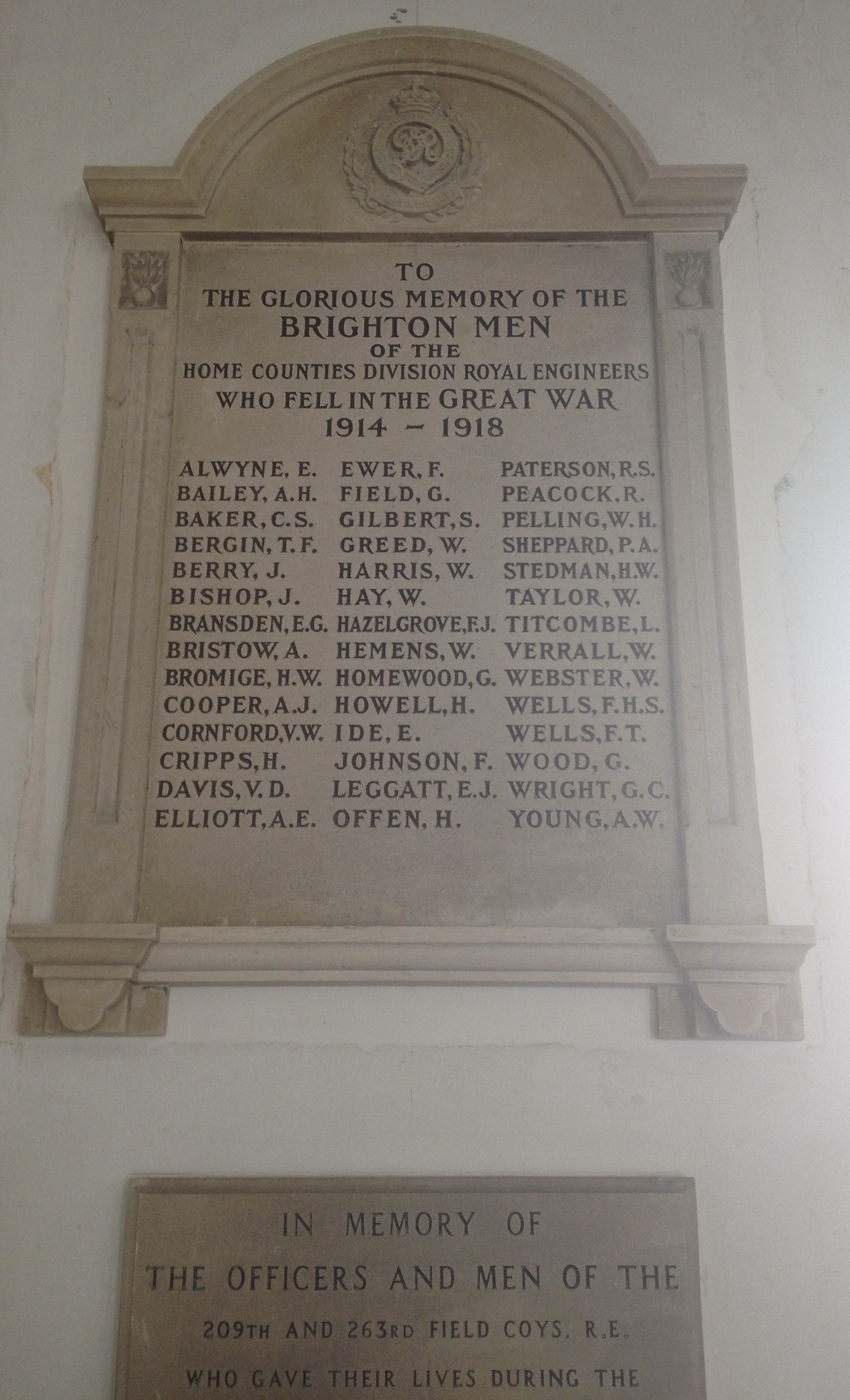
Memorial plaque in St George's Church, Brighton

=== 1/1st Home Counties Field Company ===
On 2 February 1915, the 1/1st Home Counties Fd Co was transferred from GHQ Troops at Racquenham to join 8th Division in the Lys sector. This division had been formed in the autumn of 1914 from Regular units returned from colonial garrisons, including two Regular RE companies. The decision had now been made to give each infantry division a third RE company, so that one could work with each of the brigades. 1/1st HC Field Co served with 8th Division on the Western Front throughout the rest of the war.

The company's first duties were to build breastworks rather than trenches in the waterlogged front line and to make extemporised mortars and Jam tin grenades. By the end of the month the division went into training for the planned Battle of Neuve Chapelle and the RE prepared depots of battle stores including trench bridges and ladders. 1/1st Home Counties Fd Co built a Pontoon bridge over the Lys to carry the extra traffic. The attack on 10–13 March advanced the line by about 800 yards (730 m). The company then carried out preparations for further attacks at Fromelles and at Aubers Ridge, including provision of splinter-proof shelters, footbridges, mine galleries, gun emplacements, roads and approach trenches. The division's attack at Rouge Bancs was a costly failure.

8th Division was then moved north to a quieter sector. In September it prepared a limited attack at Bois-Grenier as a diversion from the main Battle of Loos. Once again 1/1st (HC) Fd Co built a pontoon bridge across the Lys to aid traffic flow. Although none of the enemy positions was held at the end of the day's fighting, the company wired and consolidated a new shorter defence line in No man's land.

==== Somme ====
Preparations for the 'Big Push' (the Battle of the Somme) began in April 1916, with the RE Sapping towards the enemy positions, preparing dugouts and assembly positions, and making gaps in the wire. 1/1st Home Counties Fd Co was not engaged in 8th Division's disastrous attack on the Ovillers Spur on the First day on the Somme (1 July), but was sent up in the evening to help hold the line. The sappers spent the night bringing in wounded, of whom there were over 3000 across the division's front.

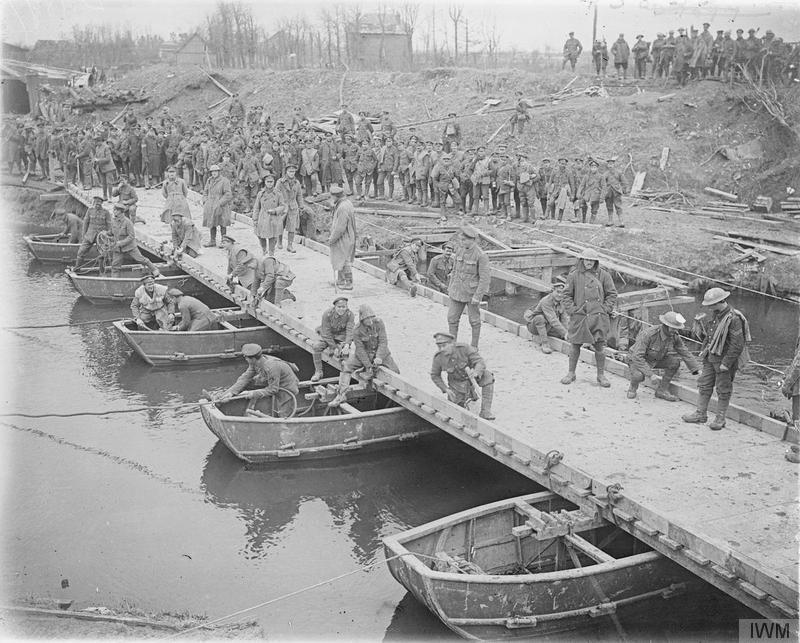
Royal Engineers laying a Pontoon bridge during the German retreat, March 1917.

After this disaster 8th Division was withdrawn, and 1/1st HC Fd Co was put to work on defences at Loos and in front of the Hohenzollern Redoubt. Later in July it rejoined 8th Division in the Ginchy sector. The division returned to the Somme for the Battle of Le Transloy (23–30 October), with the sappers preparing additional communication trenches before the attack. The company went in with the attack, which was only partly successful.

The company spent the winter building Nissen huts and carrying out improvements to trenches and wire. It was redesignated 490th (Home Counties) Field Company when the TF RE companies were numbered on 1 February 1917. 8th Division carried out an attack at Bouchavesnes on 4 March, and then followed up the German Retreat to the Hindenburg Line (Operation Alberich) (14 March – 5 April).

==== Ypres ====
In May the division went into reserve to prepare for the Third Ypres Offensive, the RE work including burying signal cables, building roads, forming dumps of stores, and assisting an RE Tunnelling Company building deep dugouts. The division made a daylight raid on Bellewaarde Farm on 24 July, and then participated in the Battle of Pilckem Ridge that opened the offensive on 31 July. It was then relieved on 2 August to refit and train for a renewed attack to complete the capture of the first objectives.

On the night of 10 August, just before going back into the line, Divisional HQ (DHQ) suffered an air raid, and a bomb killed the officer commanding 490th (HC) Fd Co, Maj C.C. Bryan, and wounded two other officers and six other ranks. Major D.L. Herbert took over command of the company. Zero hour for the Battle of Langemarck was 04.45 on 16 August, and 490th (HC) Fd Co laid out tapes to help the men of 25th Bde to find their forming-up positions in the mud and craters in the dark. The infantry crossed the Hanebeek stream and began dealing with enemy pillboxes. But the divisions on either flank were unable to advance as far, and 8th Division was left 1,000 yards (910 m) in front with its flanks exposed. Dangerous German counter-attacks began to come in, and by nightfall the division was practically back on its starting positions. The division spent the rest of the offensive making demonstrations without actually attacking. The sappers spent the winter in Ypres.

==== Spring Offensive ====
The German spring offensive opened on 21 March 1918. 8th Division had just come out of the line for rest, but after the initial German breakthrough it was sent up on 23 March to hold the Somme crossings, blowing up the bridges after the retreating troops had crossed back over them. The divisional frontage was very wide, and there were no reserves, so when 25th Bde was hard pressed the only troops to hand were 490th (HC) Fd Co. The sappers were ordered to take up position across the Morchain–Pertain road to act as a rallying point. After further severe fighting, 25th Bde fell back to hold this position in the afternoon. However, the river line had been penetrated elsewhere, and by 26 March the division was fighting at Rosières. After a week's fighting retreat it was relieved at Moreuil Wood on 2 April.

8th Division was next in action at Villers-Bretonneux on 24–25 April, when 490th (HC) Fd Co was in action, losing numerous casualties to Mustard Gas. The division was then moved south, where it faced another heavy German attack and consequent retreat at the Aisne (27 May – 6 June). The exhausted division was then withdrawn into reserve, with the sappers at St Quentin and Le Treport.

==== Hundred Days ====
8th Division entered the Allied Hundred Days Offensive at the Battle of the Scarpe (26–30 August). It followed up by forcing the Rouvroy–Fresnes Line (7–8 October). After the attack on the Drocourt-Quéant Switch Line on 4 October the Germans in this sector suddenly retreated and 8th Division participated in the capture of Douai on 17 October.

On 30 October, 8th Division was pursuing the defeated Germans and sent 23rd Brigade to establish a bridgehead across the Scheldt opposite Odomez. 490th (HC) Field Co constructed a light cylinder bridge by 21.00 that evening. but it collapsed, and was not fully repaired until 04.00 the following morning, so the lead battalion crossed by rafts. However, it came under heavy attack on 31 October and was ordered to withdraw. Although the bridge was again broken, all the wounded were got away.

On 4–5 November the division concentrated round Marchiennes, where the sappers were engaged in improving roads and canal and river crossings. When the Armistice with Germany came into effect at 11.00 on 11 November, 8th Division was 3–4 miles NNE of Mons. On 16 November it was relieved and went back to Tournai, then moved to the Ath–Enghien area by 18 December. Here demobilisation began, and the cadre of 490th (HC) Fd Co returned to England in May 1919 after the division was disbanded.

=== 1/2nd Home Counties Field Company ===
On 2 February 1915 the 1/2nd Home Counties Fd Co was transferred from GHQ Troops at Blendiques to join 5th Division at Bailleul. This Regular division was part of the original BEF that had gone to France in 1914; it was now given 1/2nd HC as a third field company, which served with it for the rest of the war.

==== Hill 60 ====
The company was at work in the line as soon as it arrived, suffering casualties at Messines Ridge and at Hill 60, where it assisted in the mining operations preceding its capture on 17 April. 5th Division was then engaged during the German offensives (the Second Battle of Ypres) including the battles of Gravenstafel Ridge (23 April) and St Julien (24 April – 1 May). The division was not involved in any major actions for the next year, but suffered a steady trickle of casualties as it held the line in the Ypres sector from May to July, around Bray from August 1915 to February 1916, and the Arras front from March to July 1916.

==== Somme ====
5th Division was moved south to join in the Somme Offensive and was engaged in the Attacks on High Wood (20 July – 1 August). During these actions, the RE were engaged in building positions round Longueval and sections were attached to the infantry for each advance, in which they acted as riflemen as well as sappers. The division then continued in the September battles, in all of which the company suffered casualties, at Guillemont (3–6 September), Flers–Courcelette (18–22 September) and at Morval (25–26 September).

5th Division was stationed in the Béthune sector from October 1916 to March 1917. On 1 February 1917, 1/2nd HC Fd Co was designated as 491st (Home Counties) Field Company. The division was moved into position on 7 April to take part in the Battle of Vimy Ridge (9–14 April). After the successful advance, the RE made plank roads over the shell holes. The Germans knew the lost positions intimately, and were able to shell the new artillery positions accurately, so the divisional RE built deeper dugouts for the gunners and built dummy ammunition dumps to divert enemy fire. The division then took part in the attack on La Coulotte (23 April), the Third Battle of the Scarpe (3–4 May), and the Capture of Oppy Wood (28 June).

==== Ypres ====
490th (HC) Field Company was used for road building before the Third Ypres Offensive. 5th Division took part in several of the battles that autumn: Polygon Wood (1–3 October), where it was subjected to mustard gas; the advance along the Reutelbeck during the Battle of Broodseinde (4 October); the first attack on Poelcappelle on 9 October;the second attack on Polderhoek (26 October); and the Second Battle of Passchendaele (26 October – 10 November), including the third attack on Polderhoek on 6 November.

==== Italy ====
On 23 November the division was warned that it was to be moved to the Italian Front. It began entraining on 27 November and by 20 December it had concentrated to the east of the River Brenta, not far from Padua. The divisional RE built bridges over the Brenta. 5th Division later took over part of the line along the River Piave on 27 January 1918 and the RE worked to improve these positions until the division was relieved on 18 March. During this period the sappers were involved in bridgebuilding and in revetting the trenches dug into shingly ground.

==== Spring Offensive ====
On 24 March, 5th Division was warned to return to the Western Front, where the German Spring Offensive had been launched. It began entraining on 1 April and completed its concentration on 9 April between Doullens and Frévent, just in time for the Battle of the Lys. It took part in the Battle of Hazebrouck, including the Defence of the Nieppe Forest (12–15 April). After the fighting died down the division held the forest, and the divisional RE extended a Decauville Railway to bring up supplies, repairing it after frequent breaks due to enemy shelling.

On 28 June, in its first offensive operation since the Great Retreat, the division gained space clear of the forest and pushed patrols and outposts forward (the action at La Becque, Operation Borderland). Then under cover of darkness the divisional RE went forward to destroy the bridges over La Plate Becque in front of the outposts. Later they were used to strengthen various HQ dugouts.

==== Hundred Days ====
Shortly after the start of the Allied Hundred Days Offensive 5th Division was moved into the Authie–Doullens area. It took part in the Second Battle of Albert (21–23 August) and continued advancing thereafter. The Second Battle of Bapaume followed from 31 August to 3 September. The division followed up to the Hindenburg Line, attacking the outposts in the Battle of Épehy (18 September) when it captured 'African Trench'. It then played a part in breaching the Hindenburg Line at the Battle of the Canal du Nord (27 September – 1 October) and the subsequent pursuit to the River Selle, followed by the Battle of the Selle (17–23 October).

From 5 November, the division slowly fought its way through the Forêt de Mormal, crossed the Sambre and advanced across the Maubeuge–Avesnes road, where it was relieved on 10 November. After the Armistice it was in reserve near Le Quesnoy. Between 13 and 21 December it moved into Belgium and was cantoned in villages between Namur and Wavre. It remained in these billets until demobilisation began in February 1919. The last troops left for England on 10 May.

=== 1st Home Counties Signal Company ===
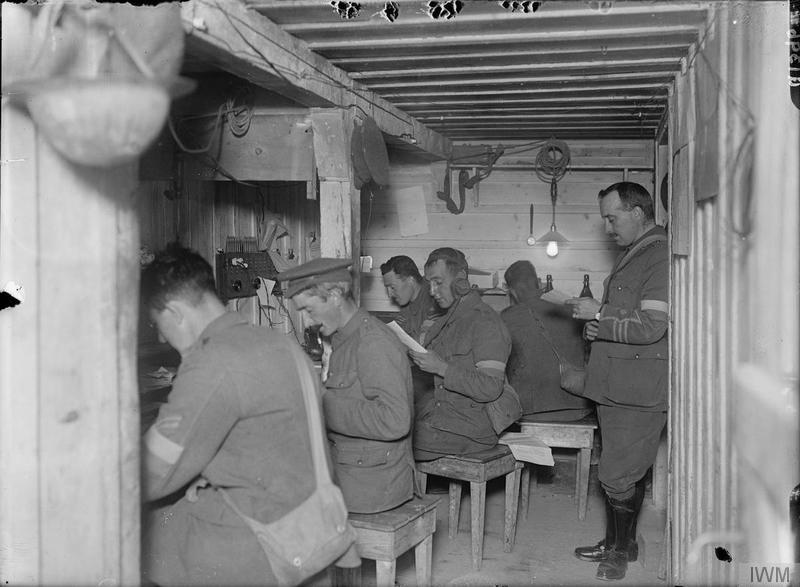
A Royal Engineers Signal Company at work on the Western Front.

28th Division was formed in December 1914 – January 1915 primarily from Regular units returned from service in India, with support units provided by the TF. On 5 January 1915, the division was joined at Winchester by the 1st Home Counties Signal Company, which provided its communications until beyond the end of the war. The division embarked at Southampton 15–18 January, disembarked at Le Havre 16–19 January and concentrated between Bailleul and Hazebrouck by 22 January. While on the Western Front it participated in the following actions:

- Battle of Gravenstafel Ridge (22–23 April)
- Battle of St Julien (24 April – 4 May)
- Battle of Frezenberg Ridge (8–13 May)
- Battle of Bellewaarde Ridge (24–25 May)
- Battle of Loos (27 September – 5 October)

On 19 October 1915, the division was ordered to entrain for an unknown destination. Units began embarking at Marseille on 24 October and by 22 November the whole division was at Alexandria in Egypt. It then embarked again for the Macedonian front, completing its disembarkation at Salonika on 4 January 1916. It spent the rest of the war on this front, where there were few major actions but the troops suffered steady attrition through trench warfare casualties and sickness. On 18 and 19 September 1918, 28th Division took part in the Battle of Doiran and the subsequent pursuit of the defeated Bulgarian Army up the Strumica Valley. On 29 September Bulgaria concluded the Armistice of Salonica with the Allies. This was followed a month later by the Armistice of Mudros with the Turks. Early in November the 28th Division was sent to occupy Constantinople and the Dardanelles Forts, with Divisional HQ at Chanak (Çanakkale).

28th Division remained in these positions, though its units (including 28th Divisional Signal Company of the new Royal Corps of Signals) were progressively staffed by Regulars after the remaining TF men were demobilised. In July 1922, 28th Division was moved to interpose between the Greek and Turkish armies (the Chanak Crisis). After a ceasefire was arranged, the British troops were progressively reduced. On 2 October 1923 the final evacuation took place, and 28th Division was disbanded.

=== 67th (2nd Home Counties) Divisional Engineers ===
2/1st Home Counties Fd Co was formed at Brighton and Eastbourne, and 2/2nd (HC) Fd Co at Hastings in October 1914. 2nd Home Counties Signal Co was formed at Brighton. The 2nd Home Counties Division began to assemble around Windsor in November 1914 and Lt-Col E.G. Hales was appointed CRE on 12 December. There was a shortage of equipment with which to train – only a few old .256-in Japanese Ariska rifles were available. In July 1915 the units had to be reorganised as TF men who had only signed up for Home Service were transferred to Home Defence brigades (termed Provisional Brigades). 9th Provisional Fd Co, predominantly an East Lancashire unit, was formed in Kent and absorbed details from Home Counties RE units. It later became 648th (East Lancashire) Fd Co in 73rd Division. When that division was disbanded in March 1918, the field company was reorganised as 648th (Home Counties) Army Troops Company, RE, and went to join the BEF on 23 June.

The 2nd HC Division was redesignated 67th (2nd Home Counties) Division in August 1915 and the signal company became 67th (2nd HC) Signal Co. The divisional RE was further reorganised with the addition of 1/3rd Home Counties Fd Co, a new 1st Line company that had been formed at Newhaven on 21 August; it joined at Southborough on 6 November. By that time the division was part of Second Army, Central Force, and was quartered in Kent, with the other two field companies at Tonbridge, and the Signal Co HQ with divisional HQ (DHQ) at Canterbury.

67th (2nd HC) Division had the dual role of home defence and supplying drafts to units serving overseas. It was twice warned for service in Ireland and in April 1917 for service on the Western Front, but these deployments never materialised and the division spent the whole war in England. By September 1916 the three field companies were based at the villages of Broomfield, Preston and Northbourne in Kent. In February 1917 the field companies were numbered: 492nd (1/3rd), 493rd (2/1st) and 494th (2/2nd). In October 1917, 492nd (1/3rd HC) Fd Co was detached from the division and joined 71st Division, the 67th receiving 645th (West Lancashire) Fd Co in exchange.

During the winter of 1917–1918, the division moved to Essex, where it joined XXIII Corps. DHQ and Signals were at Colchester, and the field companies at Colchester and Driffield. The units maintained these dispositions until after the Armistice when demobilisation began. In March 1919 the remaining divisional RE began to disband, and the process was soon completed.

=== 492nd (Home Counties) Field Company ===
In October 1917, 492nd (HC) Fd Co joined 71st Division, a training and coast defence formation that was forming a special brigade (214th Bde) for possible service in Murmansk as part of the North Russia Intervention. In the event, 214th Bde remained in the UK, but 492nd (HC) Fd Co did proceed to Russia as part of Syren Force, landing at Murmansk on 29 September 1918. In the closing months of the First World War, the force defended the ice-free port facilities of Murmansk and the Murmansk–Petrograd railway as far as Kem on the White Sea, against the threat of attacks by German and Finnish White Guard forces. It continued this duty during the complex postwar political and military exchanges with local Bolsheviks and Finnish Red Guards. The company joined Syren Force in June 1918 and served in Russia until at least July 1919.

== Interwar ==
44th (Home Counties) Division began to reform at home in 1920. When the TF was reconstituted as the Territorial Army (TA) in 1921, the field companies were renumbered and the divisional RE adopted the following organisation:

- HQ at 10 Queen's Square, Brighton
- 208 (Sussex) Field Co at Ordnance Yard, Eastbourne, also recruiting from Bexhill and Rock-a-Nore, Hastings
- 209 (Sussex) Field Co at 10 Queens Square, Brighton
- 210 (Sussex) Field Co initially at Harrow, Middlesex, then at Queen's Hall, Seaford, also recruiting from Lewes and Newhaven
- 211 (Sussex) Field Park Co, Brighton, absorbed into HQ Divisional RE (HQRE) 1924; reformed at Worthing 1939

The signal company transferred to the new Royal Corps of Signals as 44th (Home Counties) Divisional Signals. The Sussex Fortress Engineers began to reform on 1 November 1920, but a year later 210 Fd Co was moved from Middlesex back to Seaford and absorbed the Fortress Co. (Note: When 120 Construction Engineer Rgt was formed in 1947, it was considered to descend jointly from the Cinque Ports, Kent and Sussex Fortress Engineers, and derived its seniority (1890) from the 1st Sussex Engineers.)

The CRE of 44th (HC) Division, appointed on 16 February 1920, was Lt-Col H.C. Saunders, who had commanded the HC Signal Company before the First World War. He was promoted to Brevet Colonel on 16 February 1924 and after retiring was appointed Honorary Colonel on 17 July 1926. The Sussex RE found it difficult to obtain enough officers, and Saunders returned to the command for a further four-year term on 16 February 1932, before reverting to the Honorary Colonelcy.

== Second World War ==
=== Mobilisation ===
Following the Munich Crisis the TA was doubled in size. Once again, 44th (HC) Division formed a duplicate, 12th (Eastern) Infantry Division, with the following RE organisation: (Note: Rather than perpetuate 67th (HC) Division, which had seen no active service in the First World War, the duplicate division formed in 1939 took the name of a Kitchener's Army formation partly recruited in the Home Counties in 1914 that had a distinguished war record.)

- HQ at Hastings, with a new drill hall converted from properties named 'Concordia Hall' and 'Stepping Stones' at St Leonards
- 262 (Sussex) Field Co at Hastings (from 208 Fd Co)
- 263 (Sussex) Field Co at Steyning (from 209 Fd Co)
- 264 (Sussex) Field Co at Lewes (from 210 Fd Co)
- 265 (Sussex) Field Park Co at Hastings (from 208 Fd Co)

44th (HC) Division was mobilised on 3 September 1939, and the 12th (Eastern) Infantry Division became active on 7 October 1939.

=== 44th (Home Counties) Divisional RE ===
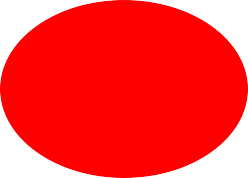
44th (Home Counties) Division's formation sign

Shortly after mobilisation, 44th (HC) Division formed the 'Ashdown Forest Mobile Group' as an anti-invasion reserve at Groombridge, with 208 Fd Co as its RE component, joining on 14 September. On 29 September it was announced that each of the 1st Line TA divisions would send one field company to France to build defences for the new British Expeditionary Force (BEF). 208 (S) Field Co was selected from 44th (HC) Division and made its way from Groombridge to Southampton, where it boarded the Mona's Queen on 26 September and landed at Cherbourg the following day.

The rest of 44th (HC) Division RE moved to Dorset for training under the CRE, Lt-Col R.H. Parsons, with 209 Fd Co at Bridport, 210 at Beaminster and Wetherby, and 211 Fd Pk Co establishing its stores and workshops at Larkham Hall. In January 1940 the division was ordered to prepare to embark for France in February, but the departure was delayed. The first RE parties left on 19 March, but 210 Field Company only embarked on 8 April, and 211 Fd Park Co's bridging section did not follow until 30 April. After landing at Cherbourg the field companies moved into France with their brigade groups (209 Fd Co with 132 Bde and 210 Fd Co with 133 Bde).

==== Battle of France ====
Once 44th (HC) Division had concentrated, HQRE was established at Estaires on 1 May, where 208 Fd Co briefly rejoined. As the training of the recently doubled TA formations was still weak, GHQ instituted a policy of exchanging some of their units with Regular formations. Having already been detached during the training period, the CRE selected 208 Fd Co as the one to be exchanged, and it was replaced in 44th (HC) Division on 4 May by 11 Fd Co from 2nd Division. This Regular company remained part of the divisional engineers for the rest of the war, usually supporting 131 Bde.

When the German offensive in the west opened on 10 May, the BEF advanced into Belgium in accordance with 'Plan D'. 44th (HC) Division moved up to the Escaut, where it was in reserve, with 11 and 210 Fd Cos preparing bridges for demolition. However, the German Army broke through the Ardennes to the east, forcing the BEF to withdraw again, and by 19 May the whole force was back across the Escaut, and the sappers began blowing up the bridges while under shellfire and bombing. 44th (HC) Division tried to hold the most dangerous point, but the Germans established bridgeheads across the Escaut at dawn on 20 May. The attack was renewed on 22 May and the division was badly chewed up, but there was no breakthrough: it was the deep penetration further east that forced the BEF to withdraw. That night the sappers began to lay anti-tank mines and prepare the bridges over the River Lys for demolition, and next day the BEF fell back to the 'Canal Line'. 44th (HC) Division was then withdrawn into reserve.

Cut off, the BEF fell back towards the coast, with 44th (HC) Division given the responsibility of defending the area round Hazebrouck. On 26 May the decision was made to evacuate the BEF through Dunkirk (Operation Dynamo). 44th (HC) Division was heavily attacked by German Panzer divisions on 27 May, but fought on doggedly until ordered to withdraw, by which time the enemy's advanced columns had penetrated between its widely-spread units. With its flanks 'in the air' after neighbouring French formations retreated during the night of 28/29 May, the divisional commander decided to withdraw some 6 miles (9.7 km) to Mont des Cats, a strong position held by the divisional artillery and the divisional RE. 210 Field Co was absent with 133 Bde (and some of the company were captured during the retreat), but 11 and 209 Fd Cos, reinforced by the RE Chemical Warfare Group (58, 61 and 62 Chemical Warfare Cos), 100 Army Fd Co and 216 ArmyTroops Co were deployed as infantry to defend this position, with 211 Fd Park Co in reserve, though only DHQ and scattered elements managed to join them by dawn. This rearguard was subjected to intense mortar fire next morning, then by dive-bombing, but held its position for 30 hours while the rest of the division withdrew. The remnants of the division reached the beaches for embarkation, landing in England on 1 June.

==== Home Defence ====
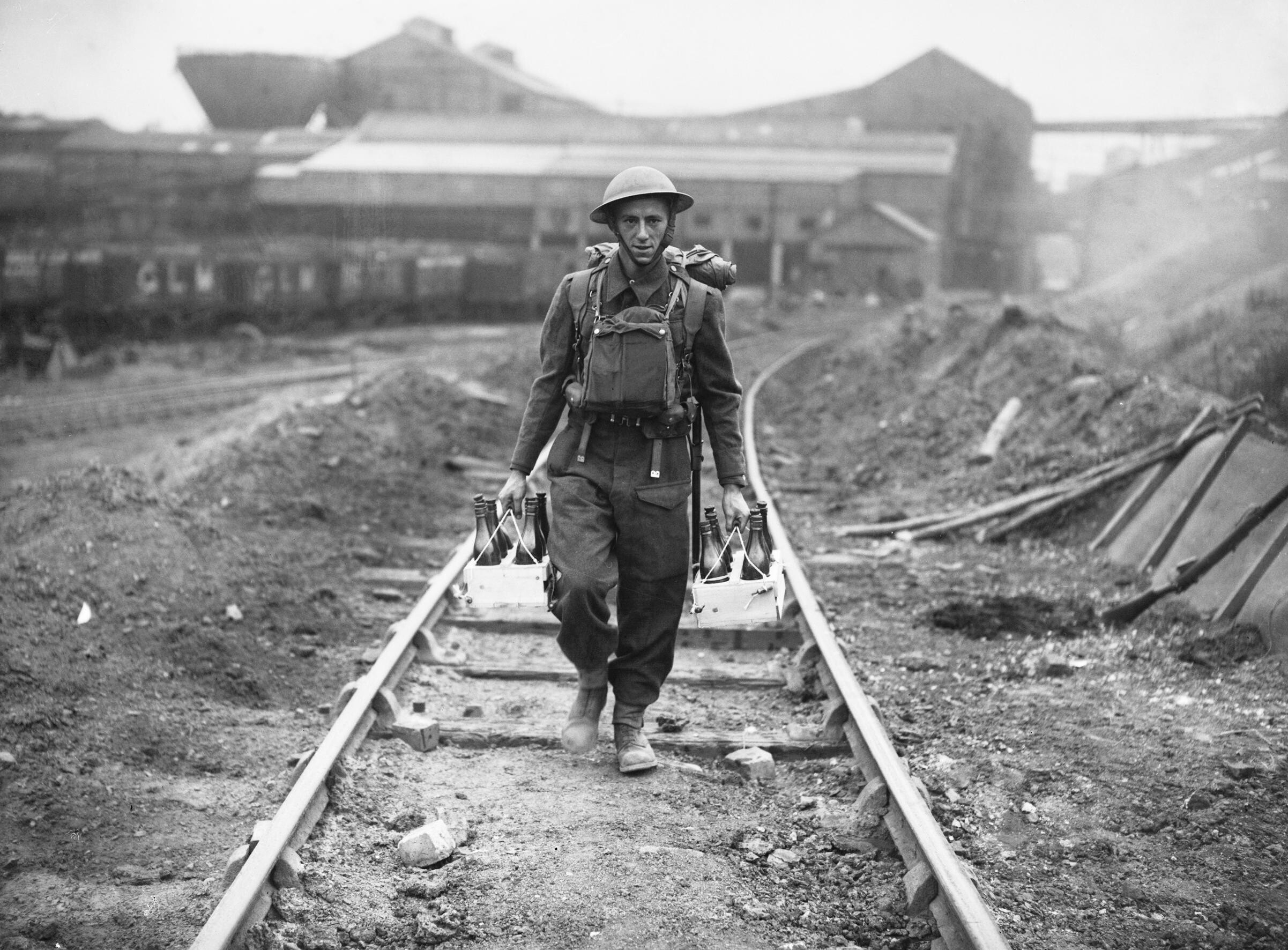
A sapper from 211 Field Park Company, Royal Engineers, attached to 44th Infantry Division, carrying 'Molotov Cocktails' made from beer bottles, Woodlands near Doncaster, 3 September 1940.

Back in England, 44th (HC) Divisional Engineers assembled at Port Meadow Camp, Oxford, on 6 June, and then the companies joined their brigade groups. 209 Field Co went to Castle Bromwich with 132 Bde, 210 Fd Co to Gloucester with 133 Bde, and 211 Fd Park Co to Shrivenham; later 11 Fd Co joined 131 Bde at Fosdyke. Re-equipment began in July, after which 44th (HC) Division moved to Northern Command. The sappers were soon engaged in building anti-invasion defences. 209 Field Co moved to Ollerton in Nottinghamshire, where it worked on pillboxes and other defences along the River Trent. It also put a ferry into operation in case the bridges were destroyed by bombing. 210 Field Co worked on pillboxes and preparing bridges for demolition around Castleford and Snaith while 211 Fd Park Co was at Pontefract; both then moved to continue the work around Doncaster.

In November 1940, 44th (HC) Division was transferred to XII Corps in invasion-threatened South East England; 209 Fd Co went to Tenterden, while 210 moved around Kent. The next year was spent alternately training and working on beach defences. On 27 July 1941 the CRE, Lt-Col W.G.R. Nutt, was wounded and the OC (Maj Becher) and another officer of 209 Fd Co were killed while inspecting a mine on Dover beach. In January 1942 the unit was relieved of its operational duties and concentrated on training for crossing minefields and anti-tank ditches. In February the whole division concentrated at Mote Park, Maidstone, and on 29 May it embarked for Egypt, via Freetown, Cape Town and Aden.

==== North Africa ====
44th (HC) Division arrived at Suez on 24 July, shortly after Eighth Army had retreated to the El Alamein position. At first its engineers worked on the Delta defences in the rear, then on 14 August the division was called forward by General Bernard Montgomery and the following day assigned to XIII Corps. The division was positioned on the vital Alam Halfa ridge, where General Rommel was expected to attack the El Alamein line. Its positions were protected by minefields through which 'gates' had been left to allow patrols to come and go. At each 'gate' there was an infantry picquet; if the enemy approached the picquet would place mines in ready-made holes and an attached sapper would arm them. When the attack came in on 30 August (the Battle of Alam el Halfa), the Panzers spent hours attempting to break through in the darkness. On the morning of 31 August, a German tank was seen approaching one of these gates in front of 133 Bde. The infantry left their cover to place the mines, but were all disabled by the tank's machine-gun. Sapper K. Stansfield of 210 Fd Co calmly walked 100 yards (91 m) down the forward slope, armed and placed 12 mines under continuous fire from the tank's main gun, and then walked back unharmed. Stansfield was awarded the Distinguished Conduct Medal (DCM). Over the next two days the Panzers made repeated attacks but 44th (HC) Division held its position. Detachments of the field companies went out at night to destroy disabled enemy tanks in front of their positions to prevent their recovery. By 3 September the division was counter-attacking.

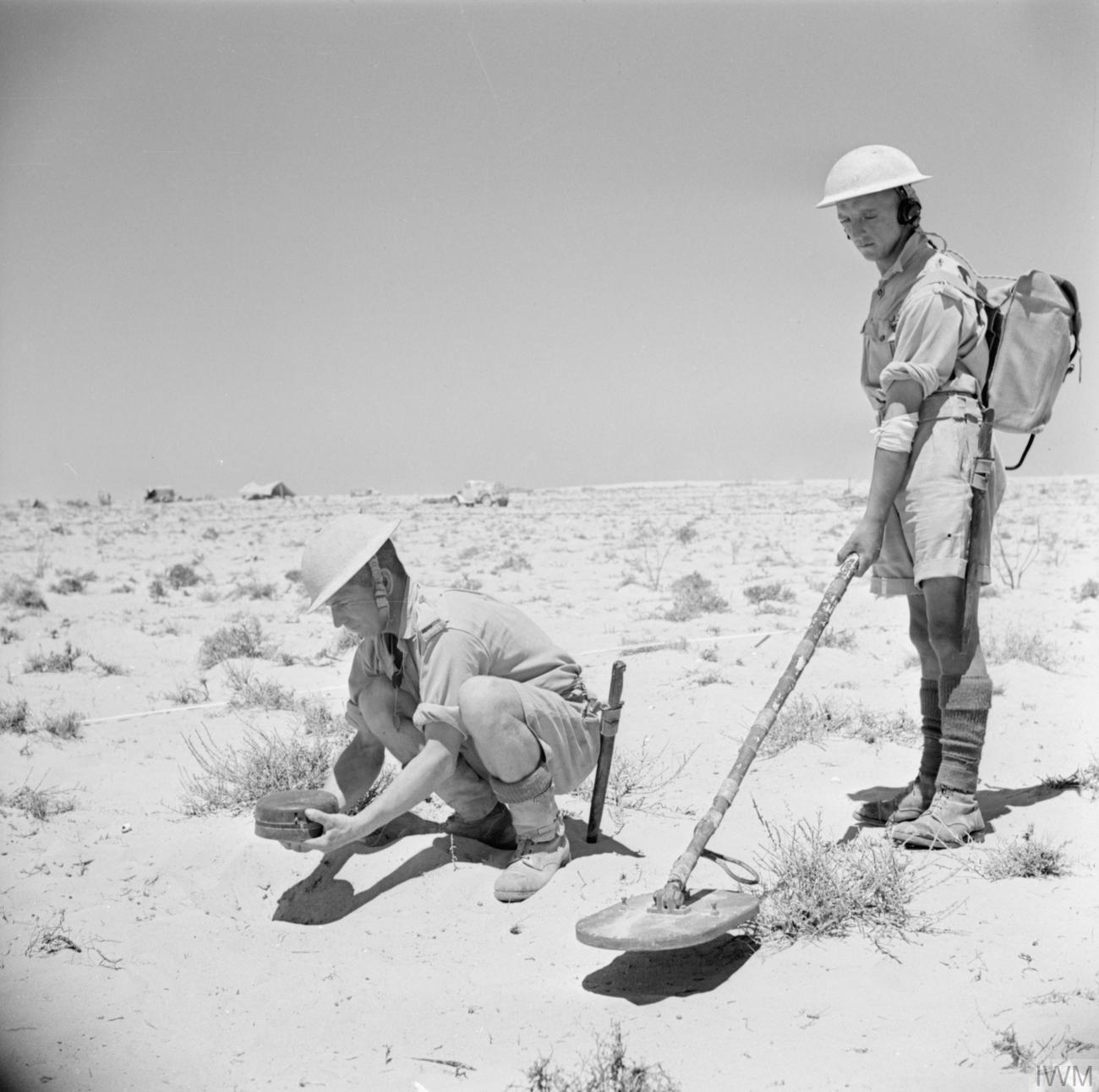
Sappers using mine detectors in North Africa, 1942.

For Eighth Army's counter-offensive (the Second Battle of Alamein), 44th (HC) Divisional RE was reinforced by the attachment of 577 Army Fd Co from XIII Corps Troops RE (CTRE), while 11 Fd Co was detached with 131 Bde to 7th Armoured Division. 44th (HC) Division was to lead one of XIII Corps' thrusts through the enemy minefields on the first night, 23/24 October (Operation Lightfoot), but without sufficient electronic or mechanical aids the sappers had to find and lift the mines by hand under intense fire. With the armour, however, 11 Fd Co had the assistance of three 'Snail' lorries from 211 Fd Park Co, which left a trail of diesel oil over the desert that was visible in the moonlight to mark the cleared lane. As the RE historian wrote: 'Thus we had the unusual sight of a field park company leading an army into battle'. The section came under heavy fire, however, so its commander, Lt R.B. Hoskyns, made a fresh attempt with a small party. Although they were working in the middle of a firefight, they succeeded in clearing a lane to allow a carrier platoon through. Thus a route was found through the first belt of minefields ('January') on the first night of the battle. 44th (HC) and 7th Armoured Divisions' sappers succeeded in passing the second minefield ('February') the next night, but the armour was unable to exploit beyond. The sappers continued working on the gaps until they were completed on 28 October

The second phase of the offensive, Operation Supercharge, was launched on the night of 27/28 October. On 2 November, 133 Bde alongside the New Zealand 28th Maori Battalion, secured objectives covering the flanks of the attack, after which the sapper units began clearing gaps for the armour through the minefields. 133 Brigade advanced through the 'February' minefield on 3 November with No 2 Section of 209 Fd Co clearing the route, but got held up on the 'Avon' minefield until 5 November. By now the enemy was withdrawing and the exhausted sappers were given a week's rest.

XIII Corps was short of transport and was left behind as Eighth Army drove westwards. The sappers were left with the task of clearing the battlefields. 11 and 209 Field Cos were sent up to Benghazi on 19 November, arriving on 25 November where 209 Fd Co began the task of clearing and re-opening the harbour as an advanced supply base for Eighth Army. The company remained on this work until April 1943, joined by the other units of 44th (HC) Divisional RE as they completed their mine-clearing tasks and moved up in early December. 211 Field Park Co used its own and captured machinery such as road rollers.

=== XXX Corps Troops RE ===
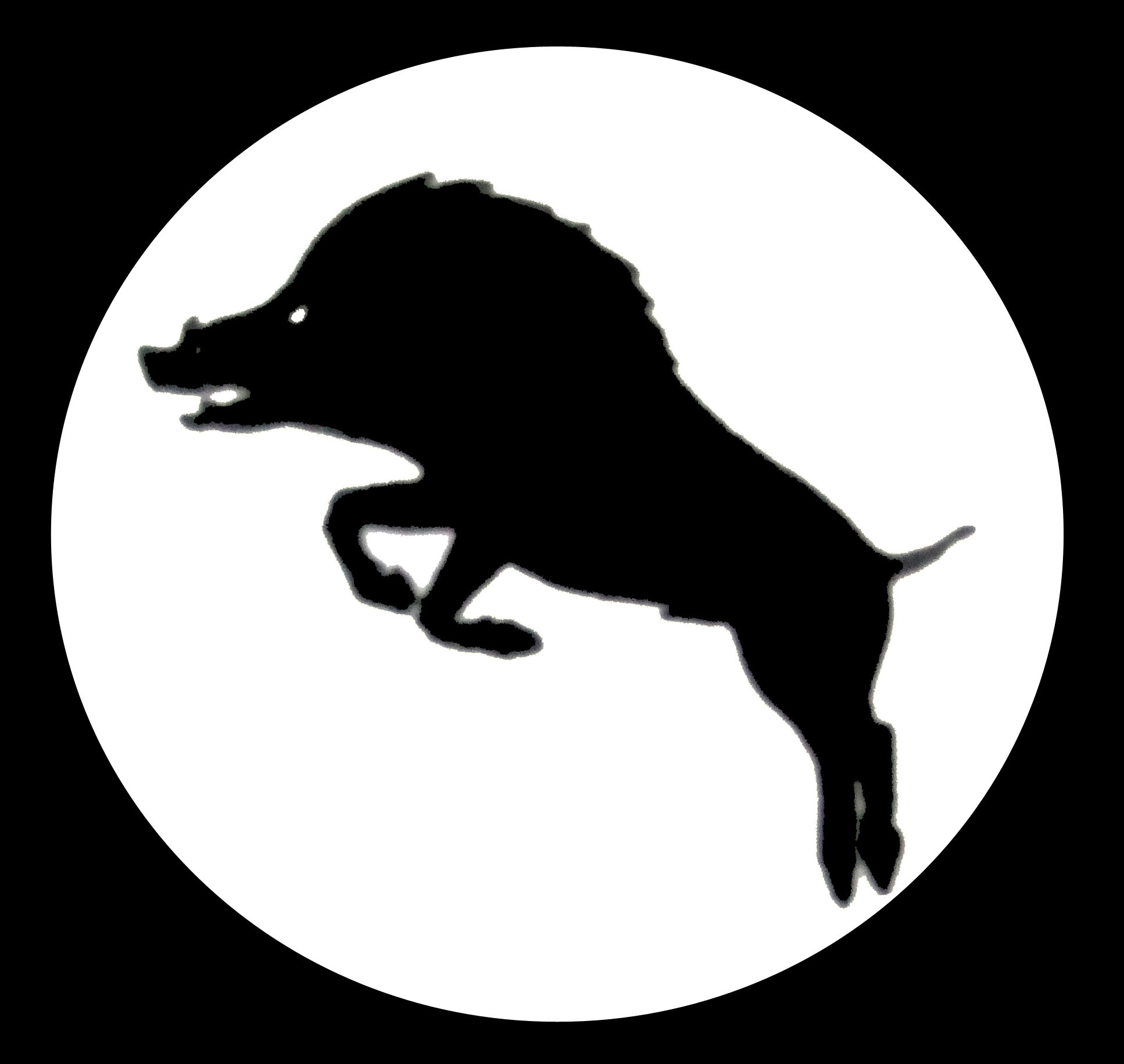
XXX Corps' formation sign

Shortly after Alamein 44th (HC) Division HQ was disbanded, and its units distributed to other formations. On 26 November 1942, 44th (HC) Divisional RE (11, 209, 210 Fd Cos and 211 Fd Park Co) became XXX Corps Troops RE (XXX CTRE), replacing a number of South African Engineer Corps units that had fulfilled the role up to that point.

XXX Corps had led Eighth Army's pursuit across Tripolitana to Tunisia in early 1943. The advance was delayed by enemy demolition and mines, entailing much work for the sappers. In March XXX CTRE moved up to Tripoli to work on improving the road behind the advance, dealing with 68 demolitions and craters, one of which required a bridge of five 30 feet (9.1 m) spans. XXX Corps launched Eighth Army's assaults on the Mareth Line on 20 March and the Wadi Akarit position on 6 April. The Tunisian Campaign ended with the Axis surrender on 12 May.

==== Sicily ====
In May 1943, XXX CTRE moved up to Sfax in Tunisia to join its corps, which was training to land in the first wave of the Allied invasion of Sicily (Operation Husky) on 9/10 July. The engineers followed later: 209 Field Co sailed from Sousse on 18 July and landed on Beach 20 near Porto Bello, south of Syracuse, on 21 July; 211 Fd Park Co also landed at Port Bello, but 210 Fd Co did not arrive until 4 August. The engineering required included mine clearance, bridge building and road repair as XXX Corps advanced to Catania and Mount Etna.

The last Axis forces evacuated from the island on 17 August, leaving behind much destruction of communications. On 15 August, XXX CTRE reconnoitred the important coastal route at Taormina, which had been damaged by British naval gunfire and then by enemy demolitions. The road was cut into a cliff, overhanging a railway line, part of which ran through a tunnel whose mouth had been blown in. Calculating that a 150–160 feet (46–49 m) bridge was required across the gapped road, the CRE ordered up one field company and a Bailey bridge platoon. A Canadian tunnelling company was also called up to widen the approach road by removing the cliff above it, and a bomb disposal section had to check the tunnel for mines and booby-traps. Eventually, the bridge assembly could start on the morning of 21 August, the road being opened two days later.

XXX Corps did not take part in the invasion of the Italian mainland, and in November 1943 XXX CTRE sailed from Augusta for the UK, 209 Fd Co sailing direct to Glasgow, where it disembarked on 26 November, the remainder travelling via Algiers and arriving during December.

==== North West Europe ====
XXX Corps now began to prepare for the Allied invasion of Normandy, Operation Overlord. The corps' leading troops landed on D-Day and the build-up of forces began thereafter: 209 Fd Co landed on 'King' Sector on Gold Beach during the early hours of D+2 (8 June), losing some men drowned. 210 Field Co landed at Sword Beach later the same day, and on 10 June a reconnaissance party of five sappers captured an enemy machine gun post and five prisoners. The field park company disembarked in four groups between D+3 and D+6, acquired equipment for roadmaking and airfield construction at Bayeux and based itself there during the Normandy campaign, handling stores for road- and bridge-building, and manufacturing all manner of objects required by the army. The field companies operated behind the lines, maintaining roads and clearing mines. 210 Field Co began to take up sleepers to convert a railway into a road, but after objections from the French railway authorities they had to be replaced and the railway reinstated. 209 Field Co spent 7–16 August at Aunay-sur-Odon, clearing 1,500 yards (1,400 m) of rubble-strewn road with bulldozers, making 2,000 yards (1,800 m) of diversions, spraying roads to keep down dust, and building a Class 40 Bailey bridge. The company then moved up to deal with roads washed out by the flooded River Odon, and on 17 August No 2 Platoon built a 50 feet (15 m) Bailey bridge across the River Orne.

After the breakout from the Normandy beachhead, XXX CTRE under Lt-Col R.E. Black was called on to assist in the major bridging operation on the River Seine at Vernon. Their role was to clear the road to the crossing site, including replacing blown road and rail bridges over the River Eure at Pacy-sur-Eure that threatened to hold up the whole operation. 11 Field Co was sent to begin the work, first clearing a road block at St Acquilin; unfortunately this had been booby-trapped and five sappers were killed in the explosion. XXX CTRE then spent the next two days working continuously on the Pacy bridges until the sappers were exhausted. XXX CTRE continued worked on road repairs and bridging along the 'Club' and 'Heart' routes through Northern France and across Belgium into the Netherlands.

After the failure of Operation Market Garden, vital road and rail bridges at Nijmegen were damaged by German swimmers who attached mines to the piers. A hole was blown in the roadway of the road bridge, but was swiftly repaired by the insertion of two Bailey spans by XXX CTRE and 15th (Kent) GHQ TRE; the bridges were also camouflaged. On 21 October, 209 and 210 Fd Cos paddled assault boats across the Nederrijn to rescue 138 men of 1st Airborne Division who had been sheltered by Dutch civilians since the failure of Market Garden. For the rest of the year the sappers were engaged in bridge-building, encountering considerable problems at Beringen bridge when the flooded river washed away the approach roads and threatened the bridge.

During the German Ardennes Offensive, XXX Corps was moved down to defend the line of the River Meuse, and the corps RE prepared the bridges for demolition. Once the situation had stabilised XXX Corps advanced to recover the lost ground, with the RE re-establishing communications and clearing minefields. The latter task was especially dangerous in the frozen ground, and resulted in many casualties.

21st Army Group returned to the offensive with Operation Veritable to clear the Reichswald, led by XXX Corps. A few days before the attack was due, a thaw set in, and the vital supply roads collapsed. All available engineers were put to roadbuilding to maintain the traffic flow for the concentration of troops, ammunition and supplies. The attack began on 8 February, but that evening rain began to fall and water levels rose by 18 inches (46 cm). The mass of engineers worked continuously to keep roads open to sustain the offensive. As the divisions fought their way forward, XXX CTRE was sent in to reinforce the divisional engineers. By 13 February, the whole of the Reichswald had been cleared and the first phase of Veritable completed. The companies then returned to clearing and maintaining the main routes, and were back at Nijmegen by early March.

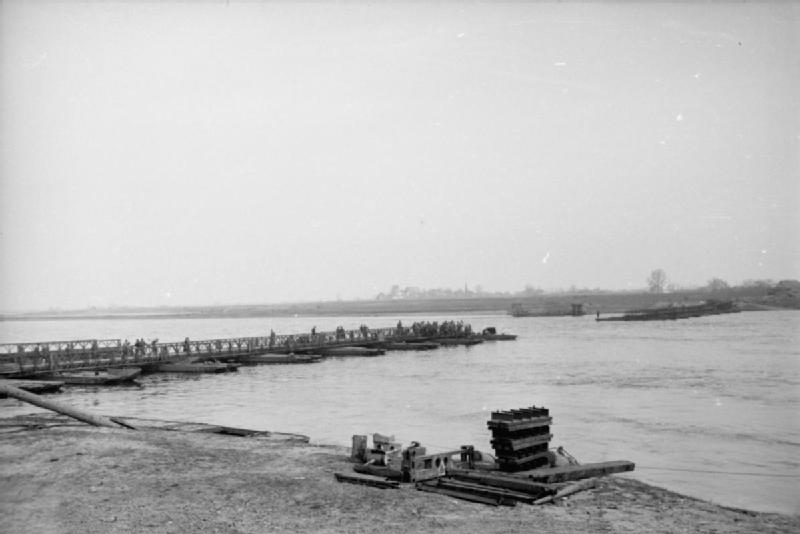
A Bailey pontoon bridge across the Rhine nearing completion on D+1.

By mid-March, 21 Army Group had closed up to the Rhine. Now it paused to prepare for an assault crossing (Operation Plunder). The bridges to be constructed on XXX Corps' front after the initial crossings were codenamed after famous London bridges: XXX CTRE under Lt-Col Black was responsible for 'Lambeth' (named after Lambeth Bridge), a Class 15 Bailey pontoon bridge. 211 Feld Park Co constructed equipment such as cradles to transport naval Tugboats, and acted as a reserve of manpower for the bridging parties. Work began at 03.00 on 25 March, but enemy fire from the uncaptured town of Rees on the far bank caused casualties equivalent to a platoon's strength with 30 minutes. After daylight the work continued under a smokescreen and despite a collision from an out-of-control tugboat the bridge was opened at 08.30 on 26 March.

Across the Rhine 209 Fd Co worked with 51st (Highland) Division and 210 Fd Co with 43rd (Wessex) Division to help with their route maintenance, and then on 5 April 209 Fd Co with a platoon of 11 Fd Co built a 213 feet (65 m) bridge over the River Ems under fire; this was open for traffic the next day. The whole of XXX CTRE was required for the bridge over the River Weser. The site was still in enemy hands on 20 April when the reconnaissance was carried out, but work began at 12.00 on 22 April for a Class 40 bridge, and the bridgehead was defended and patrolled by the sappers themselves, 'mopping up' a number of prisoners.

As the rapid advance continued, 209 Fd Co filled craters and built a 110-foot treble/single Bailey at Hassel on 1 May, replaced a 30-ft Bailey at Bremervörde with two 20-ft single/double Baileys starting at 21.30 on 3 May and completing the job at 04.30 on 4 May. By 6 May it was looking after 11 bridges and collecting surplus bridging materials from nearby sites as it upgraded them for heavier traffic. Immediately after news arrived of the German surrender at Lüneburg Heath, 209 Fd Co started building a large Prisoner of War (PoW) camp.

Postwar, the companies carried out many tasks, from clearing bridge wreckage and building PoW camps, to running trade schools. Demobilisation by age and call-up group reduced the companies to cadre strength by early 1946. 211 Field Park Company was put into suspended animation on 28 March 1946, with some of its remaining personnel transferring to 11 Fd Co, and next day the remainder together with the cadres of 209 and 210 Fd Cos transferred to two field squadrons (4 and 621) of 7th Armoured Division, which took over the TA numbers of 209 and 210 before eventually being placed in suspended animation.

2nd Division's formation sign.

=== 208 (Sussex) Field Company ===
208 (Sussex) Fd Co joined 2nd Division on 4 May 1940, and by 12 May it was deployed on the Dyle Line (see above). During the retreat to Dunkirk, its role was to destroy bridges and create anti-tank obstacles. Some of the volunteers who stayed behind to blow 'last minute' bridges were unable to make it back to Dunkirk, where the rest of the company was evacuated by 31 May.

The company served in home defence until April 1942 when it embarked for India with 2nd Division. In India it trained for amphibious operations on the coast of Burma, but when the Japanese launched a pre-emptive attack (the U Go Offensive) against Kohima and Imphal in March 1944, 2nd Division was among the reinforcements rushed to the Central Front. The company fought with the division to break through and relieve the defenders of Kohima and then to drive the Japanese off of Kohima Ridge. 2nd Division then continued its campaign through Monsoon rain to relieve Imphal, with 208 Fd Co clearing roadblocks and building bridges.

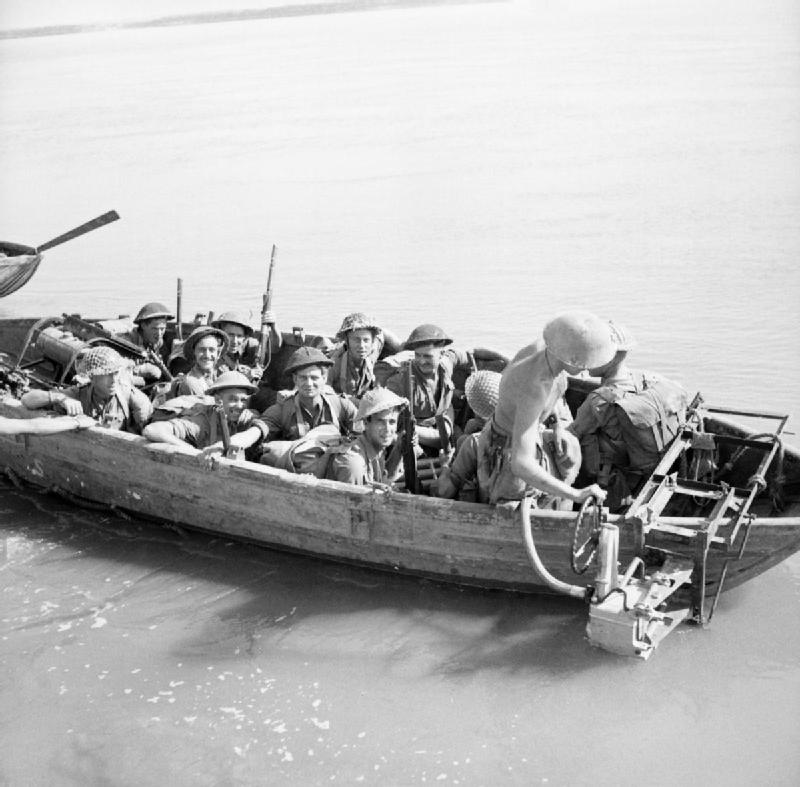
The Dorsets cross the Irrawaddy by assault boat, 26 February 1945.

Operations resumed in November, and 208 Fd Co operated ferry services and repaired roads and bridges behind the advancing Fourteenth Army. On 24 February 2nd Division made a moonlight assault crossing of the Irrawaddy River with 208 Fd Co manning the assault boats under heavy fire. It then began a ferry to get tanks and vehicles across the river. The division advanced towards Mandalay before being disengaged and airlifted back to India for reorganisation. The Japanese surrendered before it saw action again, and the company went into suspended animation on 31 January 1946.

=== 12th (Eastern) Infantry Divisional RE ===
12th (Eastern) Infantry Divisional RE mobilised as follows in September 1939, under the command of Lt-Col W.E. Dewdney as CRE:

- 262 (Sussex) Fd Co from Hastings embodied at Eastbourne
- 263 (Sussex) Fd Co at Brighton
- 264 (Sussex) Fd Co at Seaford
- 265 (Sussex) Fd Park Co at Eastbourne

The unit moved to Milton Barracks, Gravesend, to guard the airport, undergo training, and receive reinforcements.

12th (Eastern) Infantry Divisional sign.

==== Battle of France ====
262 Field Co was ordered to proceed to France independently and arrived at Le Havre from Southampton on 20 March 1940. The company was put to work building accommodation for the new BEF. The infantry of 12th (Eastern) Infantry Division arrived in April as labour troops to work on airfields and lines of communication. On 17 May, after the BEF was forced to withdraw from the Dyle Line, 262 Field Co joined 36 Bde near Doullens, where it began constructing road blocks and preparing a massive fuel dump for destruction. It then cratered the main road and laid anti-tank mines. By 20 May the Germans had taken Doullens and the sappers were part of a long retreating column fighting off German attacks. On 22 May, about 100 men of 262 Fd Co and 50 men of the 7th Battalion Royal West Kent Regiment reached Boulogne, where 20th Guards Bde had just landed to defend the port. 262 Field Co took up position between two Guards battalions, with parties of 50 sappers posted either side of the Boulogne–Desvins road, while a party remained out to blow the last bridge over the river before joining their unit. 262 Field Co covered the retreat of 7th Royal West Kents into the defended perimeter. The defenders were attacked from all sides and by the evening of 23 May the Royal Navy was ordered to evacuate them. The last parties who could not be evacuated finally surrendered on 25 May.

The rest of the 12th (Eastern) Infantry Divisional RE sailed from Gravesend and arrived at Le Havre on 20 April. They were sent to Rouen, where 263 Fd Co was put to building camps and 265 Fd Park Co set up an RE depot and workshop. When the German invasion began, the 12th (Eastern) Infantry Division (less 36 Bde and 262 Fd Co) was ordered to concentrate at Amiens. The RE were entrained but never reached Amiens, which was already on fire after air raids. They were then withdrawn via Le Mans to Blain on the Atlantic coast, where they began building a new camp at Chateau Pont Pietin. The infantry of the 12th (Eastern) Infantry Division fought as part of 'Petreforce', holding up the German advance at the coast of heavy casualties before being evacuated through Dunkirk. The rest of the BEF remaining on the Atlantic coast then began to be evacuated through Cherbourg Naval Base, the 12th (Eastern) Infantry Divisional RE moving via Caen to get there early on 7 June. They embarked on the RMS Duke of Argyll and arrived at Southampton that evening.

The divisional RE was moved to Hexham in Northumberland, where 262 Fd Co rejoined, then returned to the south coast to work on anti-invasion beach defences along the South Coast and inland stop lines in Sussex and Kent. The 12th (Eastern) Infantry Division was broken up on 10 July, following the division's return to the United Kingdom. The divisional RE was converted into XII Corps Troops RE, the field companies formally being termed 'Army Field Companies'.

=== XII CTRE ===
XII Corps' formation sign

XII Corps HQ was formed in Aldershot Command in July 1940, and XII CTRE served with it for the rest of the war. 264 Field Co transferred to VIII CTRE in December 1941, and was replaced a year later by 280 Fd Co from 15th (Scottish) Infantry Division.

The unit moved around the UK working on defences, laying minefields and supervising civilian contractors digging anti-tank ditches. On one occasion, an infantry party wandered into a minefield near Chichester and some were killed and wounded. 262 Field Co was called upon for help and the officer commanding, Maj A.H.M. Morris, led a detachment and personally went into the crater to try to locate displaced mines, then disarmed others so that the casualties could be recovered. Major Morris was awarded the George Medal.

By July 1943, XII Corps formed part of 21st Army Group, training for Operation Overlord. In mid-October 1943, XII CTRE settled at Mote Park, Maidstone, and began intensive training in clearing mines and underwater obstacles.

==== Normandy ====
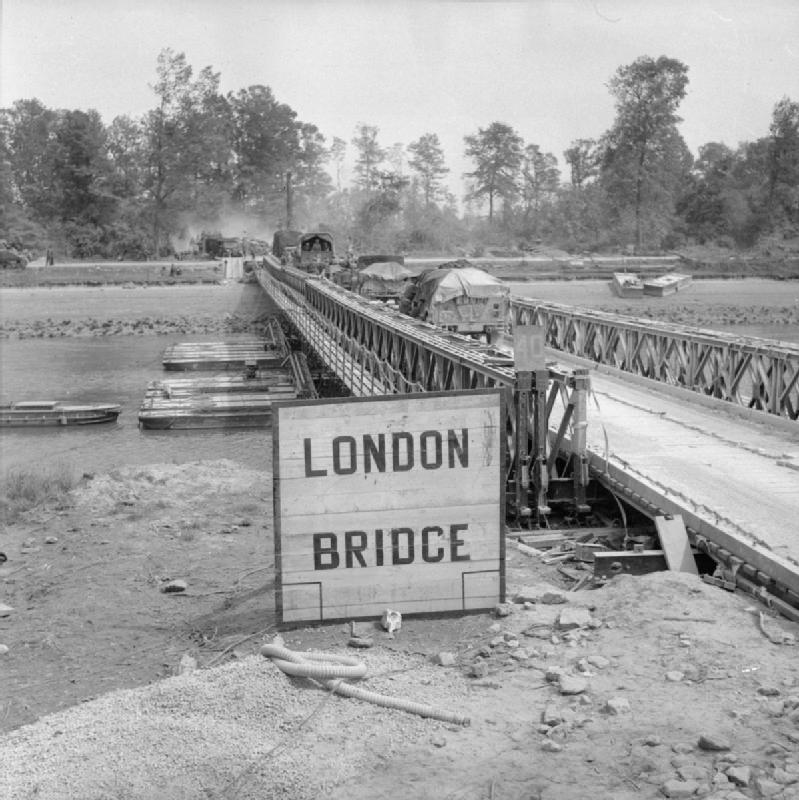
Transport crossing 'London Bridge' into the Orne bridgehead during Operation Goodwood.

For the Normandy landings, XII CTRE's field companies were loaned to the assaulting divisions as obstacle clearance parties. Shortly after 07.45 on 6 June (D-Day) 262 Fd Co (O.C., Major C.B. Stone, R.E.) landed with troops of 3rd Canadian Division on Juno Beach, 263 Fd Co with 5th Assault Regiment, RE, supporting 3rd British Division on Sword Beach and 280 Fd Co with 6th Assault Regiment, RE, supporting 50th (Northumbrian) Infantry Division on Gold Beach. Once ashore, the sappers began the dangerous task of clearing the beach obstacles before they were covered by the rising tide, and constructing exits so the follow-up troops could quickly get into action. At Colleville-sur-Orne 263 Fd Co's sappers had to clear snipers from nearby houses while working on the exits, then cleared a nearby glider landing zone.

From 7 to 10 June, 263 Fd Co operated raft ferries at Bénouville, then on 10 and 11 June it assisted 71 Fd Co in building two Class 40 bridges ('London I & II') to duplicate Pegasus and Ranville bridges across the River Orne and Caen Canal. On 8 June 262 Fd Co established company HQ at Bernieres while the platoons continued beach clearance. They reverted to XII CTRE command around 11 June, and spent the rest of the campaign clearing roads of mines and debris, filling craters and minor bridgebuilding. 265 Field Park Co and the rear parties of the field companies joined the unit later. 265 Field Park Co operated quarries for road-building material and prepared bridging equipment for the field companies.

==== North West Europe ====
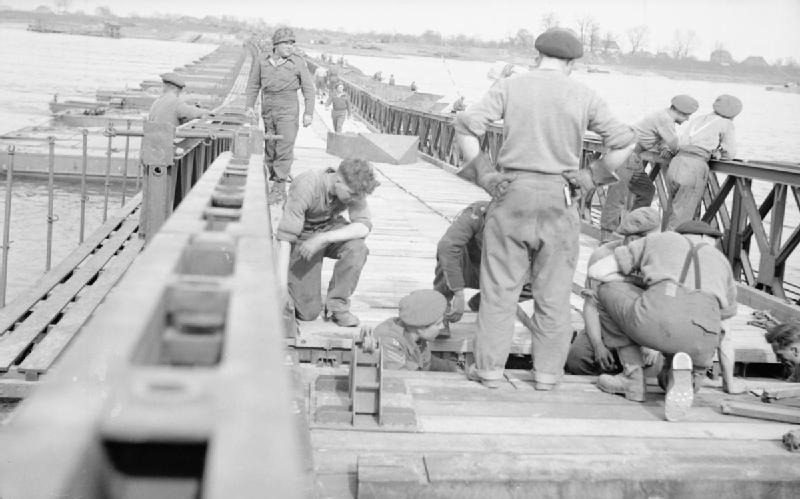
Sappers place the final planks of a Bailey pontoon bridge over the Rhine.

After the breakout from the Normandy beachhead, XII crossed the Seine, with 262, 263 and 265 Cos building a Class 40 pontoon bridge over the river at St Pierre de Vouvray on 28 August. XII Corps drove on towards Antwerp, bypassing German garrisons along the coast. On 6 September, Instead of building bridges, 280 Fd Co together with 621st Fd Squadron of 7th Armoured Division was given the task of destroying all bridges on the Lys and Escaut as far south as Oudenaarde and Deinze to prevent these Germans from threatening the flank of the advance. All these were successfully destroyed, except a large concrete bridge at Deinze that the Germans themselves later blew.

XII CTRE spent the autumn clearing roads and building bridges across the many watercourses of the Low Countries. During Operation Colin 51st (Highland) Division pushed through Schijndel to Boxtel, 262 and 263 Fd Cos building Class 40 Bailey bridges across the Halsche and Dommel rivers respectively; 262 had to use four bulldozers to clear away the old bridge before beginning work. XII CTRE supported 51st (H) Division again during Operation Ascot on 11–14 November, building a Bailey at Neder. The winter of 1944–1945 was spent keeping roads open during snow and floods.

In February and March 1945 the unit received special training in rafting and Folding Boat Equipment (FBE) bridging in preparation for the Rhine crossing, where XII Corps was to make an assault crossing alongside XXX Corps (see above). XII CTRE under Lt-Col C.J. Gardiner (together with 85 and 184 Gd Cos from 7th GHQ TRE) was allotted the task of building a Class 12 pontoon Bailey (codenamed 'Sussex') at the extreme left of the corps' area. The main bridge was 1,440 feet (440 m) long, with an additional 320 feet (98 m) across a minor gap. The start of construction was held up by enemy fire, but once work began the bridge was completed with the assistance of naval tugs on 26 March in just under 43 hours.

XII CTRE then took its turn on bridge maintenance until moving to Haffen to bridge the River Aa and remove concrete road blocks. It followed XII Corps' advance across Germany, building bridges especially across the Weser and Elbe. After the German surrender, the unit was involved in bridgebuilding at Hamburg Docks.

During the summer of 1945, XII CTRE prepared to return to the UK to reorganise for service in the Far East. It got as far as handing in its equipment and concentrating at Ghent before the Japanese surrender ended the war. With reduced equipment, the sappers assisted other units in erecting and dismantling Bailey bridges and other civil engineering works in rebuilding the occupied zone of West Germany. The unit and its companies were disbanded by 25 March 1946.

=== 264 (Sussex) Field Company ===
After it left XII CTRE, 264 Fd Co moved to VIII CTRE and then in July 1942 it joined 2nd GHQ TRE forming for the Allied landings in North Africa (Operation Torch), where it landed on 23 November. It remained in North Africa after the Tunisian Campaign until December 1943 when it moved to Italy, supporting 15th Army Group, with a detachment on the island of Vis where it worked for several weeks with the Yugoslav Partisans. The company spent 1944 working on road improvements and bridging with 4th Indian Division and I Canadian Corps. In the winter of 1944–1945 the Allies began Operation Goldflake, secretly transferring I Canadian Corps from Italy to reinforce 21st Army Group in North West Europe. 2nd GHQTRE was among the units selected, and 264 Fd Co travelled via Livorno and Marseille to Belgium, where it worked on supply routes and bridging. It continued this work in occupied Germany until disbandment in December 1945.

== Postwar ==
When the TA was reconstituted in 1947, 44th (HC) Divisional RE was reformed as 119 Field Engineer Regiment with its seniority derived from the 1st Sussex Engineers of 1890. It had the following organisation:

- Regimental HQ at Queen Square, Brighton
- 208 Field Squadron at Ordnance Yard, Eastbourne, with a detachment at Hatherley Road Drill Hall, Hastings
- 209 Field Park Squadron at Queen Square, Brighton
- 210 Field Squadron at Seaford, with a detachment at the Old Naval Prison, Lewes; a number of men from the wartime 264 Fd Co joined the unit; after 1950, a Troop was stationed at Worthing with some personnel from 211 Fd Sqn
- 211 Field Squadron at Worthing; in 1950, it became 211 (Thames & Medway) Fd Sqn and was transferred to 120 (Kent) Construction Regiment (the former Kent Fortress RE).

In 1959, 210 Fd Sqn was awarded the freedom of Seaford, together with a Freedom Sword.

In the 1961 reorganisation of the TA, the division became 44th (HC) Division/District and 119 Rgt once again became 44th (HC) Divisional RE. Headquarters remained at Brighton with 209 Fd Park Sqn, 211 (T&M) Fd Sqn rejoined (though still based at Northfleet, Beckenham and Swanley in Kent), and 208 and 210 Fd Sqns were amalgamated, with a recruiting area covering Hastings, Eastbourne, Seaford, Lewes and Worthing. To avoid argument, both numbers were scrapped and the amalgamated squadron revived a First World War number as 490 Fd Sqn.

When the TA was reduced into the Territorial and Army Volunteer Reserve (TAVR) on 31 March 1967, the division/district was disbanded and its remaining RE companies absorbed (together with 559 Sqn Royal Corps of Transport) into a new TAVR unit at Eastbourne designated B Company (Royal Engineers), 9th Territorial Battalion, The Queen's Regiment (Royal Sussex), except 209 Fd Park Sqn, whose personnel joined C Company; other personnel joined the London and Kent Regiment, Royal Artillery. B Company was disbanded on 31 March 1969.

== Commanding officers ==
The commanding officers of the unit include the following:

1st Sussex Engineer Volunteers

- Lt-Col Frederick Savage, July 1895
- Lt-Col Alfred A. Oakden, 15 August 1903

Commanding Royal Engineer (CRE), 44th (HC) Division:

- Lt-Col W.F. Cheesewright, 12 July 1913
- Col H.C. Saunders, DSO, TD, 16 February 1920 – 15 February 1926; 16 February 1932 – 15 February 1936
- Lt-Col W.A. Sparrow, 16 February 1926
- Lt-Col R.H. Parsons, MC, TD, 16 February 1936
- Lt-Col B.T. Godfrey-Faussett, 1940
- Lt-Col W.G.R. Nutt, wounded 1941
- Lt-Col J.H. Lambert, 1941–1942

CRE, XXX CTRE

- Lt-Col R.E. Black, DSO

119 Field Engineer Regiment/44th (HC) Divisional RE

- Col F.H. Foster, DSO, OBE, TD, 1947–1950
- Col H.M. de l'Orme, DSO, MC, TD, 1950–1953
- Col F.T.K. Wilson, MBE, TD, 1953–1956
- Col H.G. Pannett, TD, 1956–1959
- Col R.L.H. Braybon, MBE, TD, 1959–1962
- Col G.A. Rogers, TD, 1962–1967

CRE 67th (2nd HC) Division:

- Lt-Col E.G. Hales, 12 December 1914
- Lt-Col R.H. Mackenzie, 23 April 1917

== Honorary Colonel ==
The following officers served as Honorary Colonel of the unit:

- Henry Holroyd, 3rd Earl of Sheffield, appointed 16 May 1900, died 21 April 1909
- Col H.C. Saunders, DSO, TD, former CRE, appointed 17 July 1926; returned to command 16 February 1932, re-appointed Hon Col 16 February 1936

== Memorial ==
A memorial to the 16 men of 208 Fd Co who died in France and Burma was unveiled in All Souls Church, Susans Road, Eastbourne, on 28 October 1951.

== See also ==
- Kent Fortress Royal Engineers
- Sussex Fortress Royal Engineers
- 208th (Sussex) Field Company, Royal Engineers
- 264th (Sussex) Field Company, Royal Engineers
- 44 (Home Counties) Signal Regiment

== External sources ==
- Mark Conrad, The British Army, 1914 (archive site)
- British Army units from 1945 on
- The Drill Hall Project
- Great War Centenary Drill Halls
- Imperial War Museum, War Memorials Register
- Orders of Battle at Patriot Files (archive site)
- Land Forces of Britain, the Empire and Commonwealth – Regiments.org (archive site)
- Graham Watson, The Territorial Army 1947
