= Jonny Green (rugby union) =

Welsh rugby player (born 2004)

- Born: 16 March 2004 (age 22) Hayward's Heath, England
- Height: 200 cm (6 ft 7 in)
- Weight: 118 kg (260 lb)
- School: Seaford College
- Notable relative: John Green (father)

Rugby union career
- Position: Lock
- Current team: Cardiff Rugby
Senior career
Years	Team	Apps	(Points)
2022–2026	Harlequins		
2022–2026	→ London Scottish (loan)		
2024–2025	→ Chinnor (loan)		
2026-	Cardiff		
International career
Years	Team	Apps	(Points)
2022–2024	Wales U20		

Jonny Green (born 16 March 2004) is a Welsh rugby union footballer who plays for Cardiff Rugby. His preferred position is lock.

== Early life ==
Born in Hayward's Heath, Sussex, his father, John Green, was a rugby union player and captained Cardiff Met as well as playing for Neath, Newbridge and Saracens, and England's age-grade teams. Green was educated at Seaford College, where his father was headmaster.

== Club career ==
Green came through the rugby academy at English club Harlequins and was promoted to the Senior Academy in the summer of 2022. He played on loan with London Scottish F.C. and Chinnor RFC. He played ten-times during the 2025-26 season having signed a first senior professional contract with the club in December 2025. By the autumn of 2026 he had made 30 appearances for the club in all competitions.

Green joined Cardiff Rugby on a long-term contact in November 2026.

== International career ==
Although born in Sussex, Green qualifies for Wales through his mother. A Wales U20 international, he represented Wales at the World Rugby U20 Championship at two tournaments. He was invited to train with the senior Wales national squad during the 2024 Six Nations.
