= Disa amoena =

Scientific classification
- Kingdom: Plantae
- Clade: Tracheophytes
- Clade: Angiosperms
- Clade: Monocots
- Order: Asparagales
- Family: Orchidaceae
- Subfamily: Orchidoideae
- Genus: Disa
- Species: D. amoena

Binomial name
- Disa amoena H.P.Linder

Species of flowering plant

Disa amoena, commonly known as the spike disa, is a perennial plant and geophyte belonging to the genus Disa. The species is endemic to Mpumalanga and occurs at Lydenburg, between the Mauchsberg and Mount Anderson. The plant is threatened by bush planting, infrastructure development and invasive plants.
