= John Green (headmaster) =

English schoolmaster and rugby union player

John Green (born 17 March 1967) is an English schoolmaster and former professional rugby union player. He was the Headmaster of Seaford College.

He was educated at The Campion School, Cardiff University where he studied Sports Science and completed a master's degree in Business and Sports Science, and the Open University (advanced diploma in Economics). He played rugby for England U16s, U19s and U23s and played professionally for Saracens from 1992 to 1997.

Prior to becoming headmaster of Seaford College in 2013 he was Deputy Head of Ardingly College Prep School and Director of Sport, and Deputy Head of Hurstpierpoint College.

His son Jonny Green is a professional rugby union player.
