= Tatiana Reed =

English automotive-based social media influencer

Tatiana Reed (born 2002), commonly known as Tati Reed, is an English automotive-based social media influencer, whose content documents her 1985 Land Rover Ninety (precursor to the Defender), nicknamed "Blue Tit".

== Social media ==
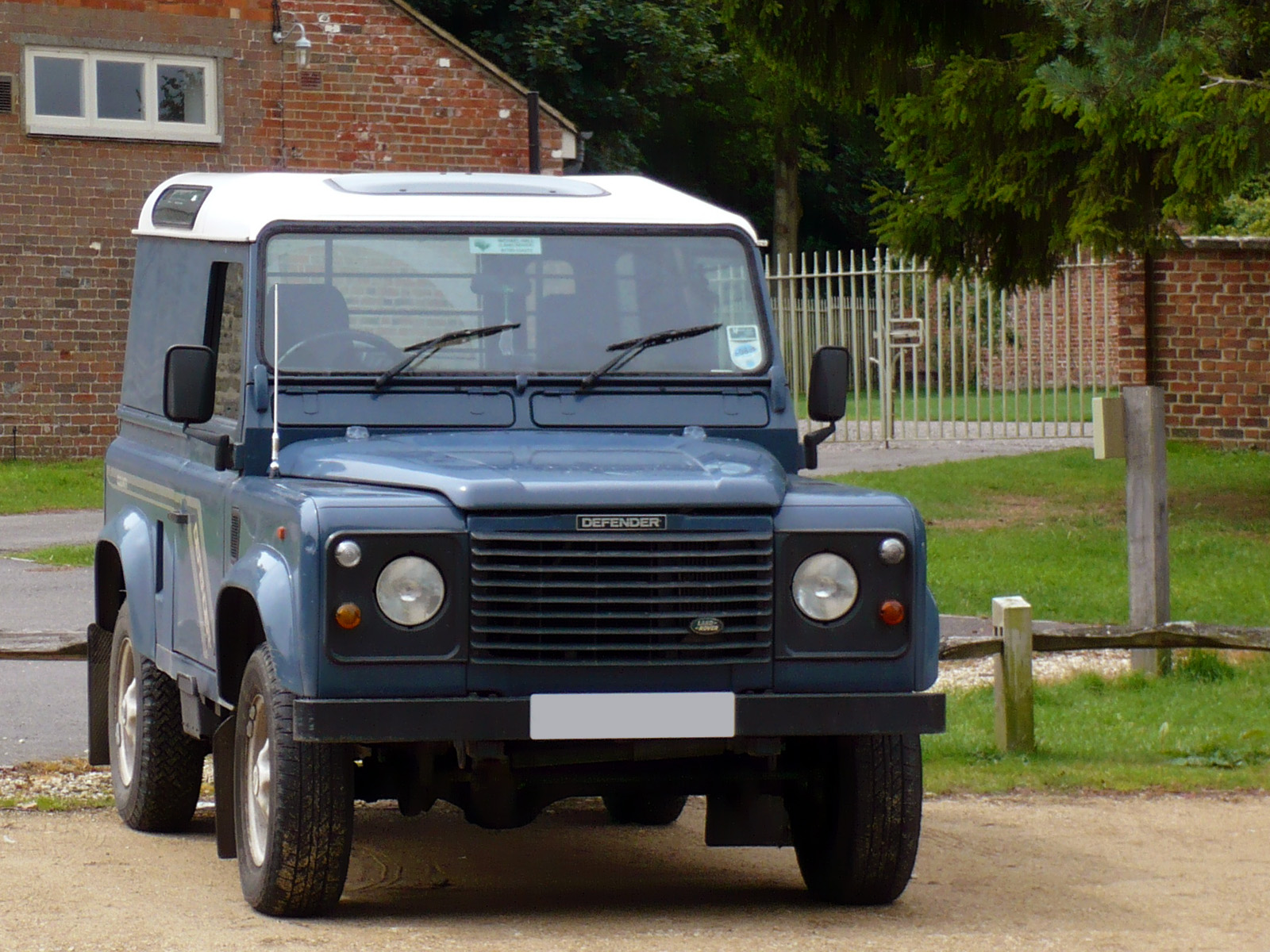
A blue Land Rover Defender 90, similar to Reed's

Reed bought her Land Rover in 2023, quickly gaining social media attention following a single post that accumulated around 23 million views, gaining her over 50,000 followers. Reed uploads her videos (which feature her maintaining her ever-problematic Land Rover, as well as driving it across Britain and Europe) to YouTube and Instagram where she is commonly known by her username, "Over in the Rover". As of June 2026, Reed has over 487,000 followers on Instagram and was listed fifteenth in the "Top 100 UK auto-influencers".

During her childhood, Reed was not interested in cars, nor were her parents, and states that her interest in cars, especially Land Rovers, only began to develop after she drove a Land Rover, aged 18.

In September 2024, Reed gave a talk to The Motorsport Society at Eton College about her travels and acquisition of mechanical knowledge through fixing her Land Rover. Reed has appeared with Izzy Hammond on DriveTribe, documenting and supporting Hammond restoring her own Land Rover "Wallycar".

Reed has a regular column on The Intercooler and Land Rover Life.

== Personal life ==
Reed's parents separated when she and her elder sister were young, which "became a catalyst to growing up quite quickly". Her father, Andrew, previously served in the military, and her mother, Sarah, is an interior designer. Reed's sister, Araminta, is a fashion model, and also an automotive-based social media influencer. Through her father's great-grandfather's maternal ancestry, Reed descends from the Viscounts Combermere and therefore the Salusburys of Llewni. Through that same ancestor's paternal ancestry, Reed descends from the marriage of the 4th Duke of Richmond and Lady Charlotte Gordon, therefore meaning she descends from the Dukes of Richmond, Marquesses of Lothian, and illegitimately from Charles II through the 4th Duke, and the Dukes of Gordon, Norfolk, and Earls of Aberdeen through Lady Charlotte. Reed is also a relative of the Victorian prime minister Sir Robert Peel, descending from his younger brother, Laurence Peel.

Reed studied photography A-level at Seaford College saying "she can make things look nice", and that her early videos looked at least "semi-professional", before realising that people "did not want things to look nice". She later studied International Relations at the University of Exeter.

As of May 2025, Reed resides in West Sussex.
