= Jeremy Groome =

English cricketer

Personal information
- Full name: Jeremy Jonathan Groome
- Born: 7 April 1955 (age 71); Aldwick, Bognor Regis, Sussex, England
- Batting: Right-handed
- Bowling: Right-arm off break

Domestic team information
- Years: Team
- 1974–1978: Sussex

Career statistics
Competition	First-class	List A
Matches	40	44
Runs scored	1,120	572
Batting average	15.77	15.45
100s/50s	–/6	–/2
Top score	86	72
Balls bowled	6	–
Wickets	–	–
Bowling average	–	–
5 wickets in innings	–	–
10 wickets in match	–	–
Best bowling	–	–
Catches/stumpings	19/–	13/–
- Source: Cricinfo, 12 March 2012

Jeremy Jonathan Groome (born 7 April 1955) is a former English cricketer. Groome was a right-handed batsman who bowled right-arm off break. He was born at Aldwick, Bognor Regis, Sussex and educated at Seaford College.

In July 1974, Groome featured in a single Youth Test match for England Young Cricketers against the touring West Indies Young Cricketers. Earlier in that same season, Groome made his first-class debut for Sussex against Northamptonshire in the 1974 County Championship. He made 39 further first-class appearances for the county, the last of which came against Gloucestershire in the 1978 County Championship. In his 40 first-class matches for Sussex, he scored a total of 1,120 runs at an average of 15.77, with a high score of 86. One of six first-class half centuries he made, this score came against Middlesex in 1975. Groome made his debut in List A cricket for the county in his debut season, against Kent in the Benson & Hedges Cup. He made 43 further List A appearances for the county, the last of which came against Gloucestershire in the 1978 John Player League. In his 44 List A appearances, he scored a total of 572 runs at an average of 15.45, with a high score of 72.
