= Frederick Savage (schoolmaster) =

Colonel Frederick Savage VD
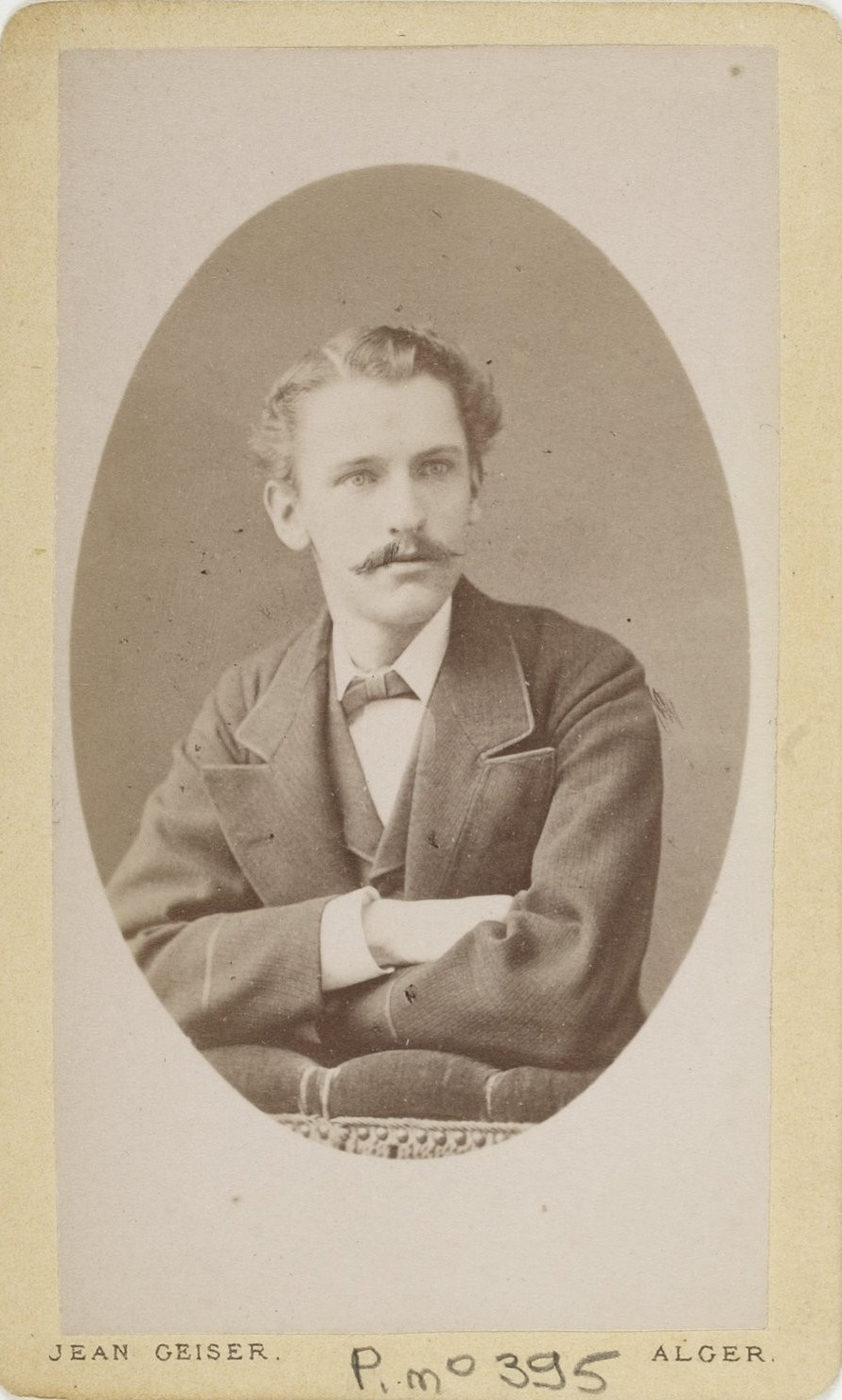
- Frederick Savage in Algiers in 1878
- Born: 28 July 1847; Southwark
- Died: 19 August 1930 (aged 83); Cranleigh, Surrey, England
- Known for: Founder and Headmaster of Seaford College
- Spouse: Harriet Skeffington

Colonel Frederick Walter Savage VD (28 July 1847 – 19 August 1930) was a British schoolmaster who founded Seaford College in 1884.

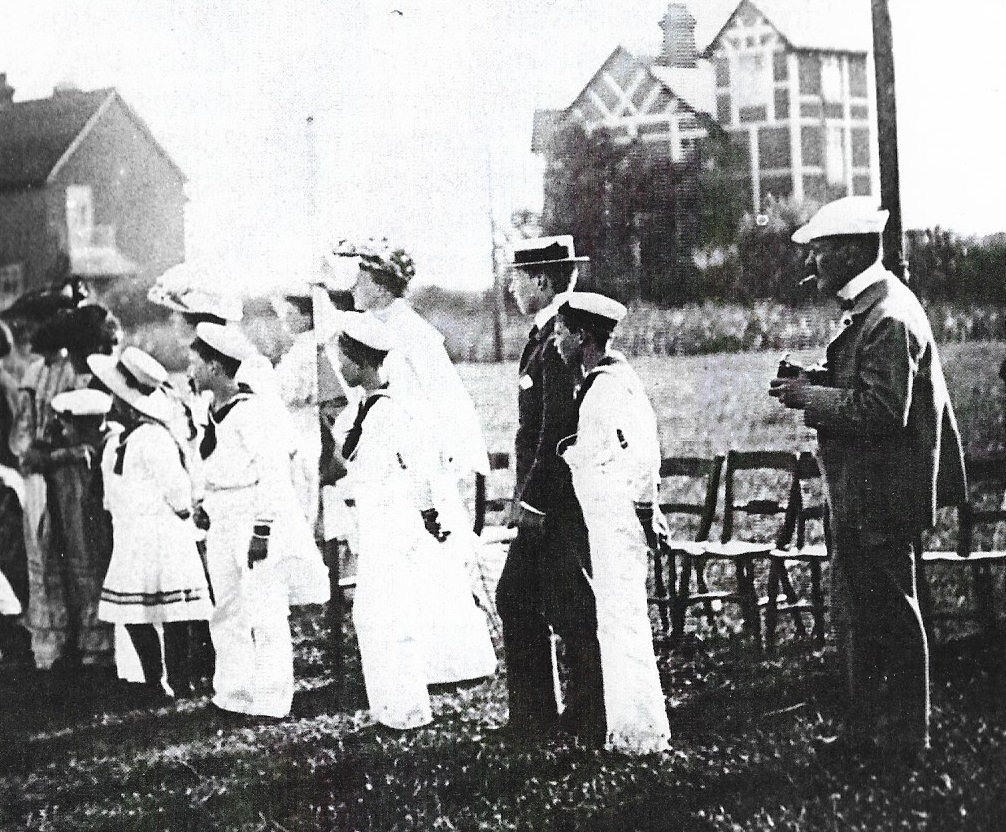
Savage (far right) and members of the Greek royal family watch on at a Seaford College sports day in 1909. Members of the Greek royal family served as patrons of the school.

The son of John Savage and Mary Ann Baldwin, he was born in Middlesex in 1847, and qualified as a Licentiate of the College of Preceptors. He became Head of Junior School at University School, Hastings, before leaving to found Seaford College at Corsica Hall, Seaford, Sussex in 1884, where he served as inaugural Headmaster until 1920. The College would later relocate to Lavington Park, Petworth, in 1946, but retain its original name. He was commissioned as a captain in the 1st Sussex Engineer Volunteer Corps in 1891 and formed an affiliated Cadet Corps at Seaford College in the same year. In July 1895, he was promoted to major in command of the 1st Sussex Engineer Volunteers. He was a recipient of the Volunteer Officers' Decoration, and was a member of the Société de Géographie. He died in Cranleigh, Surrey in 1930.

== Publications ==
- Memory book of the French grammar (1878)
- French exercises, based on the Memory work of the French grammar (1878)
