= Cinque Ports Fortress Royal Engineers =

Cinque Ports Fortress Royal Engineers 579 Field Squadron (EOD)
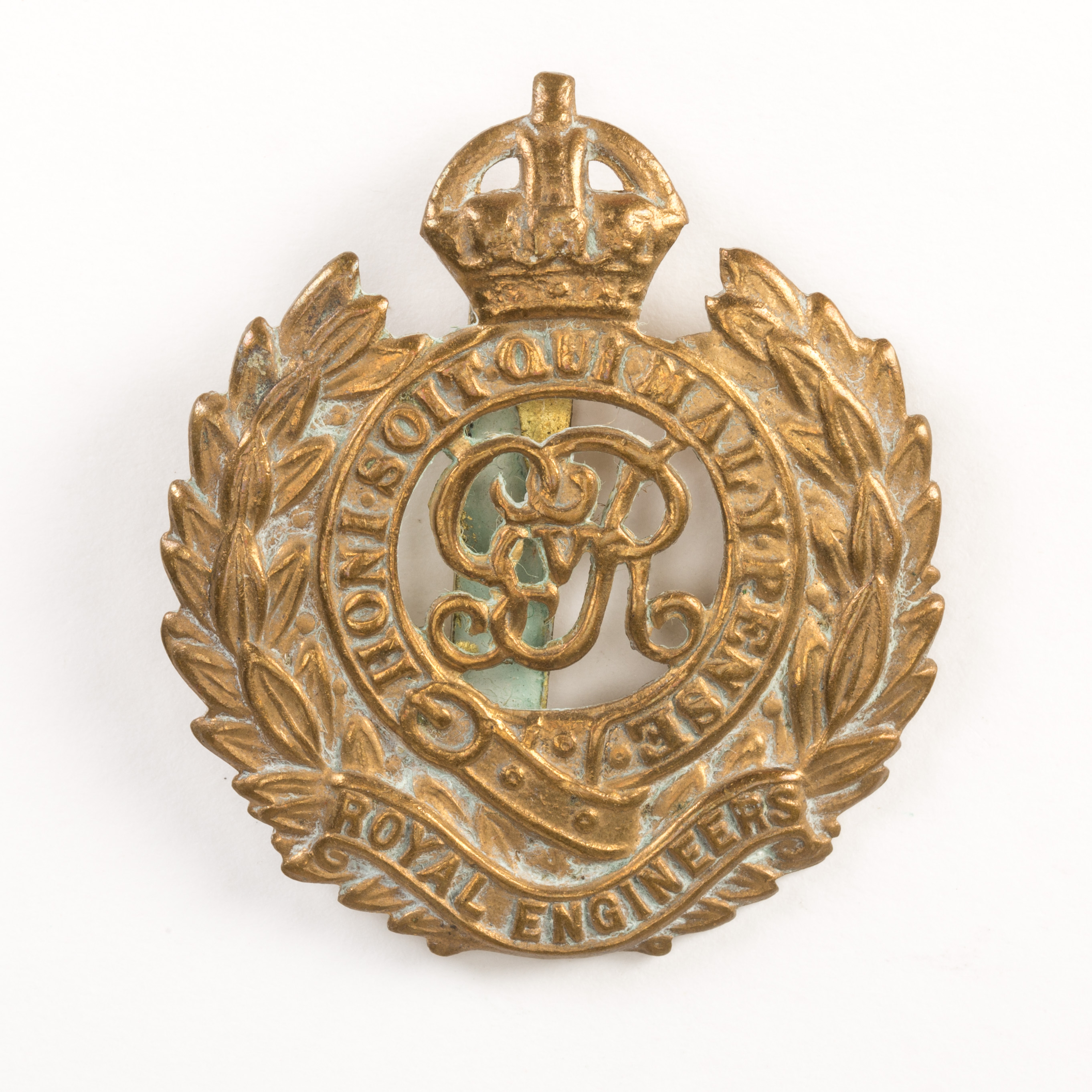
- RE Cap badge (King George V cipher)
- Active: 1908–1919; 1920–1946; 1947–1961; 1990 to date
- Country: United Kingdom
- Branch: Territorial Army (United Kingdom)
- Role: Coast Defence; Field Engineering; Bomb disposal
- Garrison/HQ: Medway Towns
- Engagements: World War I: Western Front; World War II: Tunisia; Italy; Greek Civil War

The Cinque Ports Fortress Royal Engineers was a volunteer unit of Britain's Royal Engineers serving in the defences of Dover, one of the historic Cinque Ports. It provided detachments for field service in World War I and World War II, when they saw active service in Tunisia, Italy and Greece. Its lineal descendant continues to serve in the present day Army Reserve as a bomb disposal unit.

== Origin ==
When the Territorial Force was established from the old Volunteer Force in 1908, the 1st Sussex Royal Engineers (Volunteers) was split up to provide the field engineer and signal companies of the Home Counties Division and a group of 'Kent and Sussex Fortress Companies'. These became the Sussex Fortress Royal Engineers based at Seaford, East Sussex, the Kent Fortress Royal Engineers based at Gillingham, and a company at Dover entitled the Cinque Ports Fortress Royal Engineers by 1910.

== World War I ==
At the outbreak of World War I, the unit consisted of a single Electric Lights Company based at 16 Bench Street, Dover, forming part of South East Coastal Defences. With the expansion of the army, the Cinque Ports company contributed personnel to the 1/6th and 1/7th Kent Fortress Companies organised by the Kent Fortress RE. In late 1916, the 1/6th and 1/7th were converted to field companies and had joined 73rd Division by 22 November. 73rd Division was a newly organised Home Service formation concentrating at Blackpool. Once organised, the division moved in January 1917 into Essex and Hertfordshire to form part of Southern Army (Home Forces); the engineers were stationed at Witham and Chelmsford. The two field companies were numbered 546th (1/6th Kent) and 547th (1/7th Kent) in February 1917.

73rd Division's main role was to train and physically condition men for drafting as reinforcements for units serving overseas. By the end of 1917, the division's infantry battalions had largely completed their task and been replaced by training units, whereupon the division was broken up as a Home Defence formation. 546th and 547th Field Companies were redesignated Army Troops Companies and sent to the Western Front, landing at Le Havre on 23 June 1918, and working in the Third Army and Fourth Army areas respectively from 7 July.

The two companies were engaged in engineering works associated with the rapid advance of the British Expeditionary Force in the final months of the war. 546 Company had transferred to Fourth Army by the time of the Armistice, while 547 Company moved to VI Corps in September and to Third Army by November 1918.

546th and 547th Army Field Companies were disbanded in France on 4 June 1919 and 1 May 1919 respectively.

== Interwar ==
When the Territorial Force was constituted as the Territorial Army in the 1920s, the Cinque Ports (Fortress) RE was reformed as three Lights Companies, forming part of the Coast Defence Troops in 44th (Home Counties) Divisional Area. Later, it consisted of No 1 (Electric Light & Works) Company and No 2 (Anti-Aircraft Searchlight) Company at Dover. The AA/SL company had disappeared by 1939

== World War II ==
During World War II, the Cinque Ports Fortress RE once again provided a field unit: 579 Army Field Company, formed in September 1940. This was part of Hampshire Corps Troops RE (CTRE), formed by Hampshire Fortress RE, which became IV CTRE. However, 579 Company moved to VIII CTRE in December 1941. In July 1942, the company moved again, being assigned to First Army TRE in preparation for the Allied invasion of North Africa (Operation Torch).

579 Army Field Company served during the Tunisia Campaign. When First Army was broken up at the end of the campaign, the unit was converted into a conventional field company and went to Italy as part of 14th GHQ Troops RE. It came under Land Forces Adriatic in June 1944, and then joined 20th GHQTRE when it was formed in early 1945. In June 1945, 579 Field Company accompanied 20th GHQTRE to Greece in June 1945 in connection with the Greek Civil War. 579 Field Company was disbanded after September 1945.

== Postwar ==
When the Territorial Army was reconstituted in 1947, 579 Field Company was reformed as a Construction Squadron in 121 Construction Regiment, RE. The rest of the regiment was descended from the field companies of 47th (London) Infantry Division and was based in Chelsea. In 1950, 579 Construction Squadron was converted into an independent bomb disposal unit and returned to Rochester in Kent.

When the Territorial Army was reduced into the Territorial and Army Volunteer Reserve in 1967, the squadron was disbanded, but contributed personnel to 590 Specialist Team, Royal Engineers (Explosive Ordnance Disposal). It was reformed as the 579 Field Squadron (Explosive Ordnance Disposal) in 1990, absorbed in to another unit in 1993, and reformed again in 1999 when it absorbed 2 (Surrey Yeomanry) Troop at Reigate from the disbanded 78th Fortress Engineer Regiment. It continues to serve in the Army Reserve as part of 101 (City of London) Engineer Regiment (Explosive Ordnance Disposal).

Under the Army 2020 proposals released on 3 July 2013, 579 Field Sqn (currently located at Tunbridge Wells, Reigate and Brighton) will close its Brighton centre and take over two troops at Rochester from 221 Field Sqn.

== Heritage ==
579 Squadron claims direct descent from 1/6th (Kent Fortress Royal Engineers) Field Company.

== Honorary Colonel ==
The following served as Honorary Colonel of the unit:

- Field Marshal Edmund Allenby, 1st Viscount Allenby, appointed on 12 September 1925.
- Lieutenant-Colonel J.H. Mowll, former Commanding Officer, appointed 5 March 1934.

== External sources ==
- British Army units from 1945 on
- Kent War Memorial Transcription Trust.
- British Army website
