= Sussex Fortress Royal Engineers =

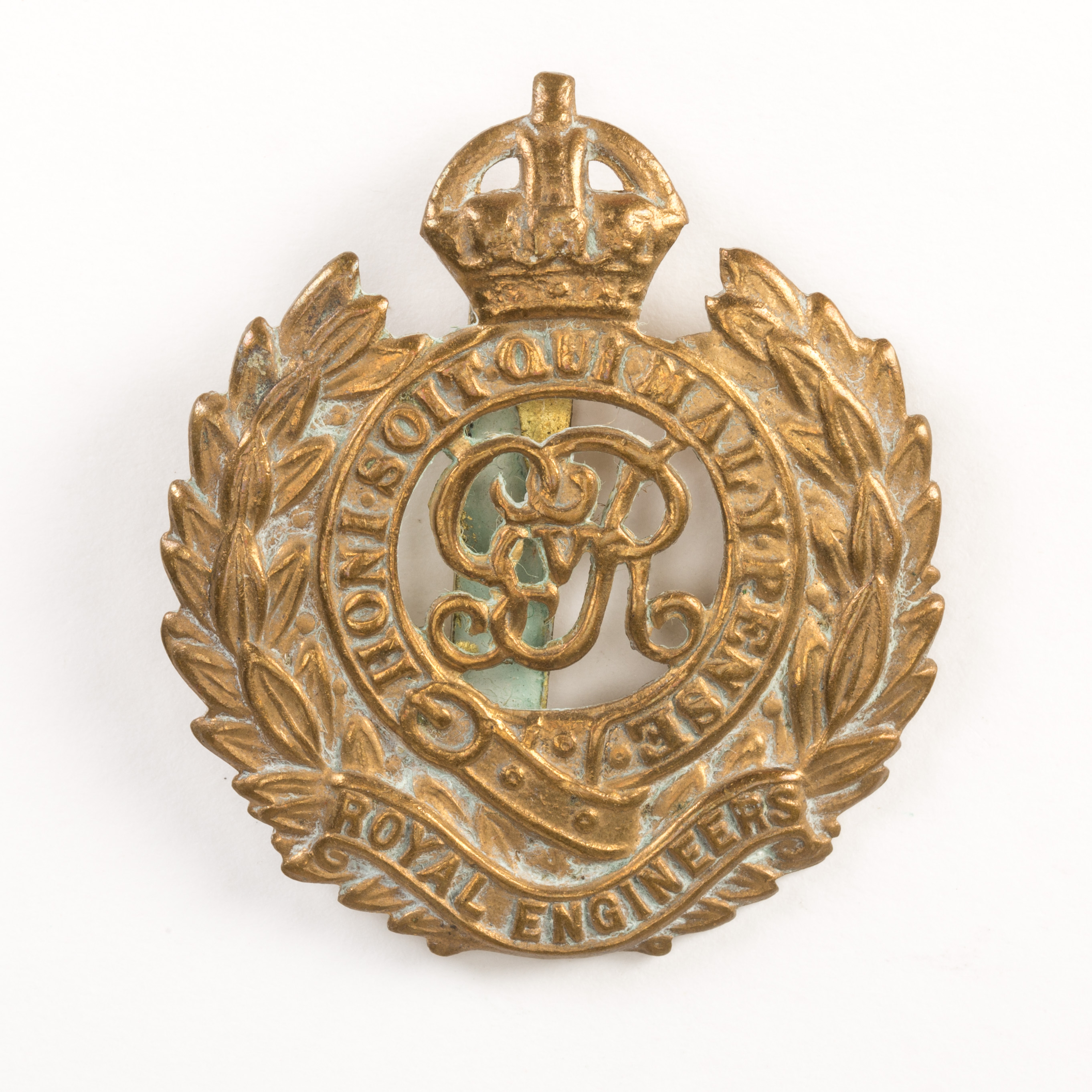
- RE Cap badge (King George V cipher)
- Active: 1908–1920
- Country: United Kingdom
- Branch: Territorial Force
- Role: Fortress engineers
- Part of: South-East Coast Defences
- Garrison/HQ: Seaford, East Sussex
- Engagements: Western Front (World War I)

The Sussex Fortress Royal Engineers was a Territorial Force (TF) unit of Britain's Royal Engineers from 1908 to 1920. As well as coastal defence duties during World War I, the unit provided works companies for service on the Western Front.

== Origin ==
The 1st Sussex Engineer Volunteer Corps was formed in 1890 as a unit of Britain's part-time Volunteer Force, eventually rising to a strength of 12 companies recruited across the county of Sussex and neighbouring Kent. Detachments from the corps served in the Second Boer War. When the Volunteers were subsumed into the new Territorial Force (TF) under the Haldane Reforms of 1908, the 1st Sussex EVC was split up: the bulk provided the divisional engineers for the TF's Home Counties Division, the Kent company formed the basis for the Kent Fortress Engineers, and B & C Companies at Newhaven and Seaford became the Sussex Fortress Engineers. The new unit comprised a single Works Company with HQ and Right Half at the Drill Hall, Queen's Hall, Broad Street, Seaford, and Left Half at the Drill Hall, Newhaven.

== World War I ==
=== Mobilisation ===
The Sussex Fortress Engineers had been due to assemble at Portsdown for annual training in August 1914; however, as the international situation deteriorated, the advance party was called back to Newhaven, where the company assembled shortly before the outbreak of war. On the night of 4 August, it was guarding the power station, Newhaven Bridge and the railway until relieved by infantry the following day. It was then put to work on the defences of Newhaven and Dover as part of South-East Coast Defences, assisted by civilian contractors.

Shortly after the outbreak of war, TF units were invited to volunteer for overseas service and at the end of August the formation of a reserve or 2nd Line unit was authorised for each 1st Line unit where 60 per cent or more of the men had volunteered for Overseas Service. The titles of these 2nd Line units would be the same as the original, but distinguished by a '2/' prefix.

=== 1/1st Sussex Army Troops Company ===
Once it was clear that the threat to Britain's coastal defences was small, six of the fortress engineer units organised their 1st Line as 'Army Troops' companies for service on the Lines of Communication. Sussex Fortress Engineers formed 1/1st Sussex Army Troops Company, RE, which sailed from Southampton to Le Havre on 20 March 1915 aboard the Empress of India and joined the British Expeditionary Force (BEF) at Étaples. It was put to work erecting accommodation for the New Army units that were arriving, and building hospitals, roads etc. In May 1916, the company's establishment was raised from 100 men to 145 and it was sent to Vimy Ridge and set to work extending the deep dugout and tunnel system under the ridge. The company devised a ropeway suspended from the roof of the sloping gallery to move the spoil to the surface, which was later adopted in other excavations. The sappers also built concrete machine gun positions and helped farmers with their harvest.

The company was numbered 577th (Sussex) Works Company in February 1917 and at Easter it was sent to the Somme sector, where it had to build its own huts before beginning work on a new Corps HQ. Next the company went to the Third Army workshops where a great deal of equipment was salvaged from war-damaged factories and installed at the complex. The workshops included a blacksmith's shop, sawmills, and a factory for SOS rockets. At the workshops, the company employed a large number of prisoners of war, civilians, and 200 Zulu labourers. The company also carried out tasks such as running a water pipe through Delville Wood. Later in the year, it moved to the Cambrai sector, where it worked on roads, bridges and pipelines in front of the Hindenburg Line; a number of casualties were suffered during this work near the front line. Officers and Non-Commissioned Officers were given special training in erecting steel bridges. One notable task was to build a 30 feet (9.1 m) steel derrick on a timber crib floated into the middle of the La Bassée Canal, where it was sunk and filled with concrete.

After the German spring offensive of March–May 1918, 577th (S) Company worked on new defence lines, including deep dugouts. During the Allied Hundred Days Offensive, it worked with 5th Bridging Company, RE, to build the longest single span Hopkins bridge over the Canal du Nord. It was serving with Third Army at the time of the Armistice with Germany. It remained on the continent, building demobilisation centres, until at least June 1919 when its own men were demobilised.

=== 2/2nd Sussex Army Troops Company ===
The Sussex Fortress Engineers also formed 2/2nd Sussex Army Troops Company, later numbered 578th (Sussex) Works Company, which performed works duties at home. In August–September 1918 it was sent to join the BEF to work on airfield construction for the Royal Air Force. It remained on the continent until at least June 1919 before being demobilised.

== Postwar ==
The Territorial Force reformed at home during 1920, and the Sussex Fortress Engineers began to reform on 1 November. However, during 1921, the reformed 44th (Home Counties) Divisional Engineers moved 210th (Sussex) Field Company to Queen's Hall, Seaford, also recruiting from Lewes and Newhaven, and it absorbed the Fortress Company. During World War II, the number 577 was re-used for a unit formed by the Hampshire Fortress Royal Engineers.

When 120 Construction Engineer Regiment, RE, was formed in 1947, it was considered to descend jointly from the Cinque Ports, Kent and Sussex Fortress Engineers, and derived its seniority (1890) from the 1st Sussex Engineers.

== External sources ==
- Mark Conrad, The British Army, 1914 (archive site)
- British Army units from 1945 on
- The Drill Hall Project
