= 58 Field Squadron, Royal Engineers =

58th Field Company, RE 58th Artizan Works Company, RE 58th (Chemical Warfare) Company, RE 58th Mechanical Equipment Company, RE 58 Field Squadron, RE
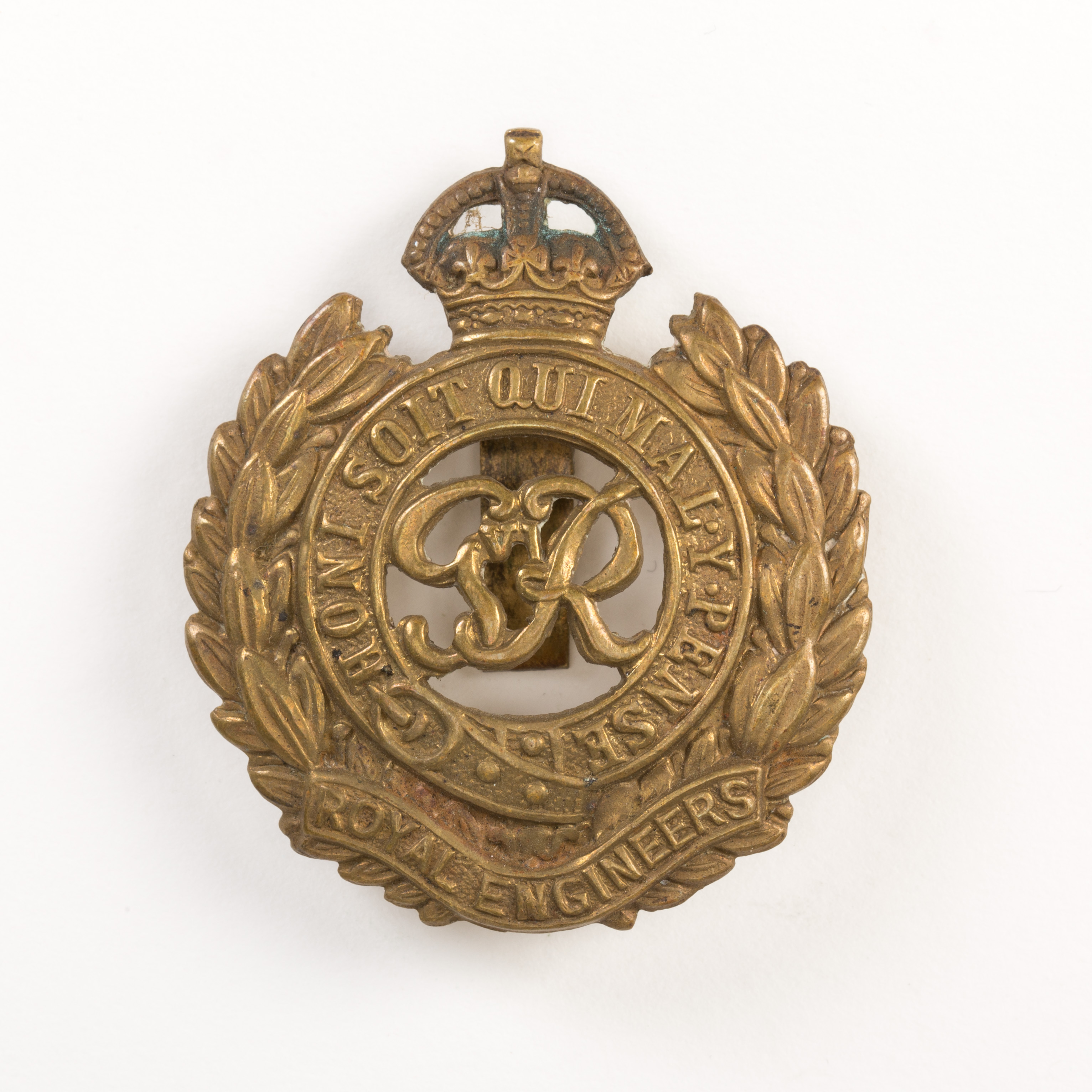
- RE Cap badge (King George VI cipher)
- Active: 1900–09; 1917–20; 1921–48; 1950–54; 1962–73; 1983–present
- Country: United Kingdom
- Branch: British Army
- Role: Field engineers Artisans; Chemical warfare Mechanical equipment Explosive ordnance disposal
- Size: Company/Squadron
- Part of: 33 Engineer Regiment (EOD)
- Garrison/HQ: Porton Down (1921–39); Carver Barracks
- Engagements: Western Front (World War I); Battle of France; Burma Campaign; Defence of Lion Box; Falklands War; 1st Gulf War

58 Field Squadron is currently an Explosive Ordnance Disposal (EOD) unit of the Royal Engineers (RE). In its long history its predecessors have fulfilled the roles of artisans, field engineers, chemical warfare specialists, and road builders. They saw active service on the Western Front in World War I and in the Battle of France and Burma Campaign during World War II. On two occasions, the unit's sappers were reputed to have repulsed enemy attacks at the point of the bayonet.

== Precursor unit ==
58th Field Company, Royal Engineers, was one of several new RE units formed in early 1900 during the Second Boer War. The company was formed at Chatham, Kent, in May 1900, moved to Salisbury Plain in February 1901 and back to Chatham in October 1903. In January 1905 it moved to Potchefstroom in South Africa, returning to Chatham in April 1909, where it disbanded the following month.

== World War I ==
In April 1917 the vacant number was revived for 58th Artizan Works Company, RE, which was one of the first batch of companies of skilled tradesmen formed for work such as building huts and roads. It went to Calais to work on the Lines of Communication of the British Expeditionary Force. It returned to the UK in 1919 and disbanded in 1920.

== Interwar years ==
In May 1921 the Experimental Company at the Royal Engineers Experimental Station (later Chemical Defence Experimental Station), Porton Down, was redesignated as 58th (Porton) Company, RE. It carried out a wide range of duties relating to experiments in offensive and defensive chemical warfare, and until 1922 was also for responsible for administering 'The Chemical Roster', a group of civilian technicians, many of whom were former members of the Special Brigade, RE, (CW companies) during World War I. The officer commanding from 1919 to 1924 was Lieutenant-Colonel A.E. Kent, a former member of the Special Brigade.

In June 1938 the unit was redesignated as 58th (Chemical Defence) Company, RE, and again the following year as 58th (Chemical Warfare) Company, RE.

== World War II ==
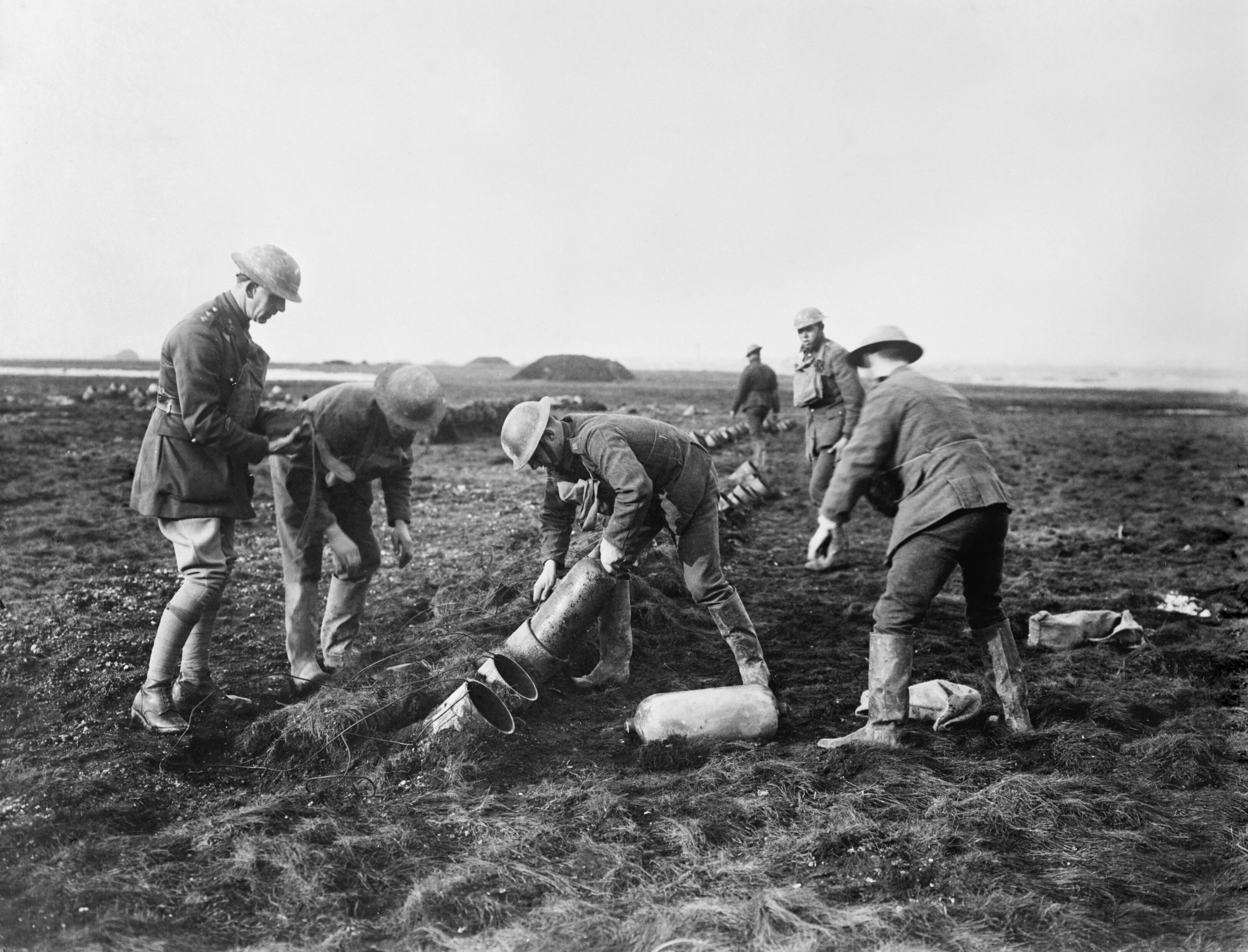
Loading and connecting a battery of Livens projectors.

After the outbreak of war, additional chemical warfare (CW) companies were raised, beginning with 61 CW Co in December 1939 and 62 CW Co in April 1940. By April 1940, 1st CW Group RE had been formed from 58, 61 and 62 CW Cos, and it joined the new British Expeditionary Force (BEF) in France in May 1940. The companies were equipped with large calibre mortars (Livens Projectors developed during World War I) to launch drums of poison gas or Thermite. In the event, both sides refrained from employing chemical weapons during World War II, and the CW companies never used their weapons in action.

=== Battle of France ===
1st CW Group under Lt-Col R.H. Maclaren joined the BEF shortly before the German offensive in the west opened on 10 May. The BEF immediately advanced into Belgium in accordance with 'Plan D'. However, the German Army (Wehrmacht) broke through the Ardennes to the east, forcing the BEF to withdraw again.

The threat to the BEF's southern flank led to the creation of several ad hoc forces to protect the flank, and 1st CW Group first acted as field engineers for 'Petreforce' then for 'Polforce', with Lt-Col Maclaren acting as Commanding Royal Engineer (CRE). The RE duties involved demolishing bridges (for which the CW companies had no training) to create a defensible line along the canal from Carvin to St Pol and Watton, This was often in a race with advancing Wehrmacht troops. No 3 Section of 58 CW Co arrived at two bridges near Blaringen and found enemy troops already in possession of them. The sappers drove off the Germans, reportedly with the bayonet, and then attempted hasty demolitions. At one of the bridges they simply drove a lorry loaded with explosives onto the bridge and detonated it. Pressure from enemy troops prevented the sappers from determining how successful this expedient had been. On 25 May the Germans had penetrated the canal line at various points, and Polforce was disbanded and its units fell back towards the coast.

By 26 May the BEF was cut off and the decision was made to evacuate through Dunkirk (Operation Dynamo). The following day Lt-Col Maclaren and 1st CW Group were put under the orders of the CRE of 44th (Home Counties) Division. This Territorial Army division had fought doggedly, but with its flanks 'in the air' after neighbouring French formations retreated, the divisional commander decided to prepare a fallback position at Mont des Cats, to be held by the divisional artillery and some companies of the 44th Divisional RE (11 and 209 Field Cos, with 211 Fd Park Co in reserve). The Mont des Cats position was reinforced by 1st CW Group together with 100 Army Fd Co and 216 ArmyTroops Co. The sappers abandoned their transport and began to dig in at 09.00 on 28 May, then deployed as infantry to defend this position. Only the HQ and scattered elements of 44th (HC) Division managed to join them by dawn on 29 May. This rearguard was subjected to intense mortar fire during the morning, then by dive-bombing, but held its position for 30 hours while the rest of the division withdrew. The units were then ordered to withdraw by stages to Dunkirk for embarkation to England.

=== Burma ===
Back in the UK, 1st CW Group formed part of the GHQ Reserve in Home Forces. After the outbreak of war with Japan, it was among the reinforcements sent out to India, leaving GHQ Reserve in February–March 1942 and arriving in India on 11 June. The group was sent to Deolali transit camp, but 58 CW Co was detached under the command of Madras District from 6 October to 15 November. It then moved with 1st CW Group to Chittagong, arriving on 24 January 1943.

Because chemical weapons had not been used by either side in the first few years of the war, chemical defence became the responsibility of all units and the RE's specialist CW units were converted into badly needed field engineers. On 1 May 1943, 1st CW Group became HQ XV Indian Corps Troops Engineers, with 58 CW Co redesignated as a Field Company. On 11 June the company moved to Ranchi under the CRE XV Corps.

In the spring of 1943 a General Reserve Engineer Force (GREF) had been established to carry out engineering works and airfield construction in the areas of Assam and Eastern Bengal behind the Army's operational area. 58 Field Co was sent up to Golaghat in Assam on 4 July to join this force. By October 1943 GREF had assembled around Imphal a large number of RE and Indian Engineers (IE) units, military and civil pioneers, and labourers provided by the Indian Tea Association. Their task, as soon as the Monsoon rains ended, was to build a two-way all-weather road from Imphal to Tamu and beyond by 1 May 1944, which was the projected date for Fourteenth Army to begin its offensive on the Central Front. On 19 October 58 Fd Co went to Pallel at the mid-point of the route to operate the quarries supplying the necessary roadstone.

=== Lion Box ===
By March 1944 the road as far as Tamu was virtually complete, but its extension was halted when the Imperial Japanese Army launched its U Go Offensive. Instead, the non-combatant GREF units that had been preparing for Fourteenth Army's offensive were evacuated, and those remaining were concentrated in self-contained defensive 'boxes' on the Imphal Plain. The largest supply depot at Kanglatongbi was formed into 'Lion Box', almost entirely garrisoned by sappers, and of these only 58 Field Co (which was initially without two of its sections) had ever been under fire. For three days from 4 April this scratch garrison repelled repeated Japanese assaults. On 5 April 58 Fd Co was ordered to send out two scout cars to check the road to the north, where enemy had been seen in an old ordnance depot area just outside the sappers' perimeter. This patrol was ambushed and the company lost one scout car and also a party that was sent out with a lorry to recover it. Later, 54 sappers from 58 Fd Co were withdrawn from the box to build a Hamilton bridge near IV Corps HQ. About 22.00 hours 58 Fd Co reported rustling of bushes and clicking of rifle bolts outside their perimeter, so a heavy defensive fire (DF) programme was called in from the artillery. Japanese patrols continued to operate in the moonlight, and recommenced their attacks at 01.00 on 6 April, but were driven off by fire from the well-sited bunkers of the box. Non-combatant units and stores continued to be withdrawn from the box to Imphal under shellfire, while some reinforcements came in. During the night of 6/7 April mortar bombs began landing in 58 Fd Co's area, but this fire was silenced by DF programmes. Japanese patrols still probed the perimeter, which was in continuous action. One of the attacks temporarily penetrated the perimeter, but was ejected at bayonet point by the reserve platoon of 58 Fd Co before it reached the road. The platoon then formed two bayonet parties to sweep the area clear of infiltrators. After dawn these parties were pinned down by sniper fire until a party of Seaforth Highlanders came up and together they formed a line and charged, clearing a gully. The rest of 58 Fd Co cleared infiltrators and acted as stretcher parties. Tank support had now got through to the box's defenders, but the decision was made to reduce the number of boxes and to evacuate the remaining garrison from Lion Box to the Imphal 'Citadel'. This was carried out in stages, under cover of an airstrike.

58 Field Company had suffered casualties of 14 killed and 22 wounded during the defence of Lion Box, 3–7 April. However, the defence of the Imphal plain slowed down the Japanese offensive and allowed the Allies to redirect troops to hold Imphal before launching a counter-strike. The subsequent Japanese defeat in the battles of Imphal and Kohima in May–June 1944 was the turning point of the war in Burma. 58 Field Co was withdrawn to Shillong on 31 May and on 5 October it came under the command of the CRE of 458 GHQ Troops IE.

In November 1944 58 Fd Co was converted into 58 Mechanical Equipment Company, RE, absorbing the personnel of 62 Fd Squadron (the former 62 CW Co), which had been roadbuilding in Northern Assam with GREF.

== Postwar ==
After the end of the war against Japan, 58 ME Co returned to Europe and became part of British Army of the Rhine, where it was disbanded in 1948.

A new 58 Field Squadron, RE, was formed at Maidstone in January 1950 by redesignating 61 Fd Co (itself a redesignation of 561 Army Fd Co, originally raised in 1939 as part of 38th (Welsh) Divisional Engineers). The squadron formed part of 36 Army Engineer Regiment, and moved with it from Maidstone to Ripon in January 1951. However, the squadron was redesignated 20 Sqn in March 1954.

58 Squadron was reformed in January 1962 at the School of Military Engineering, Chatham, as part of The Depot Regiment, RE. 58 SME Squadron was redesignated 58 RSME Squadron the following year when the school received its 'Royal' designation. The squadron was disbanded in August 1973.

The present Explosive Ordnance Disposal (EOD) unit, 58 EOD Squadron (58 Field Squadron (EOD) since 1993), was reformed in August 1983 at Lodge Hill Camp, Chattenden, as part of 33 Engineer Regiment (EOD). Elements of the regiment served in the Falklands War in 1982 and the 1st Gulf War in 1990–91.

== Insignia ==
Personnel of CW Groups during World War II wore a distinguishing flash beneath the RE shoulder title: this comprised a rectangle divided into three equal vertical stripes, green–yellow–red.

Qualified bomb-disposal personnel of 33 Rgt wear a badge on the left forearm comprising a yellow bomb facing downwards with two blue bands on the nose, all on a red oval background.

== External Sources ==
- British Army units from 1945 on
- The Long, Long Trail
