= Seaford College =

Public school in Petworth, West Sussex, England

Location
- Lavington Park; Petworth, West Sussex, GU28 0NB; England

Information
- Type: Public school Private boarding and day school
- Motto: Latin: "Ad Alta" (Aim High)
- Religious affiliation: Church of England
- Established: 1884
- Founder: Frederick Savage
- Department for Education URN: 126110 Tables
- Chairman of Governors: R Venables Kyrke
- Headmaster: Matt Williams
- Gender: Coeducational
- Age: 5 to 18
- Enrolment: 950
- Colours: Blue and gold
- Former pupils: Old Seafordians
- Website: www.seaford.org

Listed Building – Grade II*
- Official name: Lavington Park / Seaford College
- Designated: 18 June 1959
- Reference no.: 1232490

Seaford College is an independent co-educational boarding and day school at East Lavington, south of Petworth, West Sussex, England. Founded in 1884, it is a member of the Headmasters' and Headmistresses' Conference. The college is in Lavington Park, a 400-acre (1.6 km^{2}) Area of Outstanding Natural Beauty in the South Downs. The land is owned by a charitable trust and the site is run by the Board of Governors who are the trustees. The college is the inspiration for the Jennings and Darbishire children's books, written by alumnus Anthony Buckeridge.

== History ==
The college was founded at Corsica Hall, Seaford on the East Sussex coast, in 1884 by Colonel Frederick Savage, who also served as headmaster from 1884 until 1920. In 1940 the college was disrupted by a government order requisitioning all boarding school premises in Seaford and giving only six weeks in which to find a safe home elsewhere. The college was evacuated to Worthing for the duration of World War II, and once peace had resumed, the new Headmaster Canon Charles Johnson began to look for a more suitable site, the college having outgrown its original premises in Seaford. In 1946 the decision was made to buy the estate at Lavington Park and the school moved to its current location. As of the academic year 2022/23, Senior School day fees are approximately £25,000 per year, with Senior School boarding fees approximately £38,000, though a number of bursaries and scholarships are available.

The main school building, previously Lavington Park country house, is a Grade II* listed building.

== School features ==
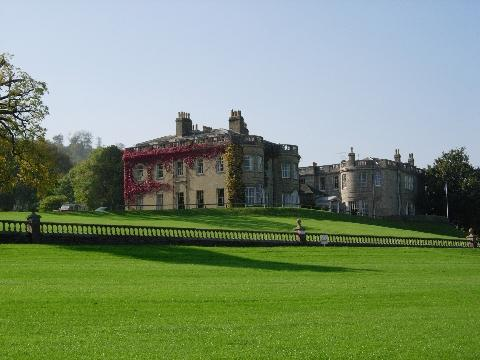
Seaford College

In the 2010 GCSE results, 87.5% of the school's pupils achieved five or more passes at grades A* to C, with 73% of pupils achieving five or more passes at the higher grades, including English and maths.

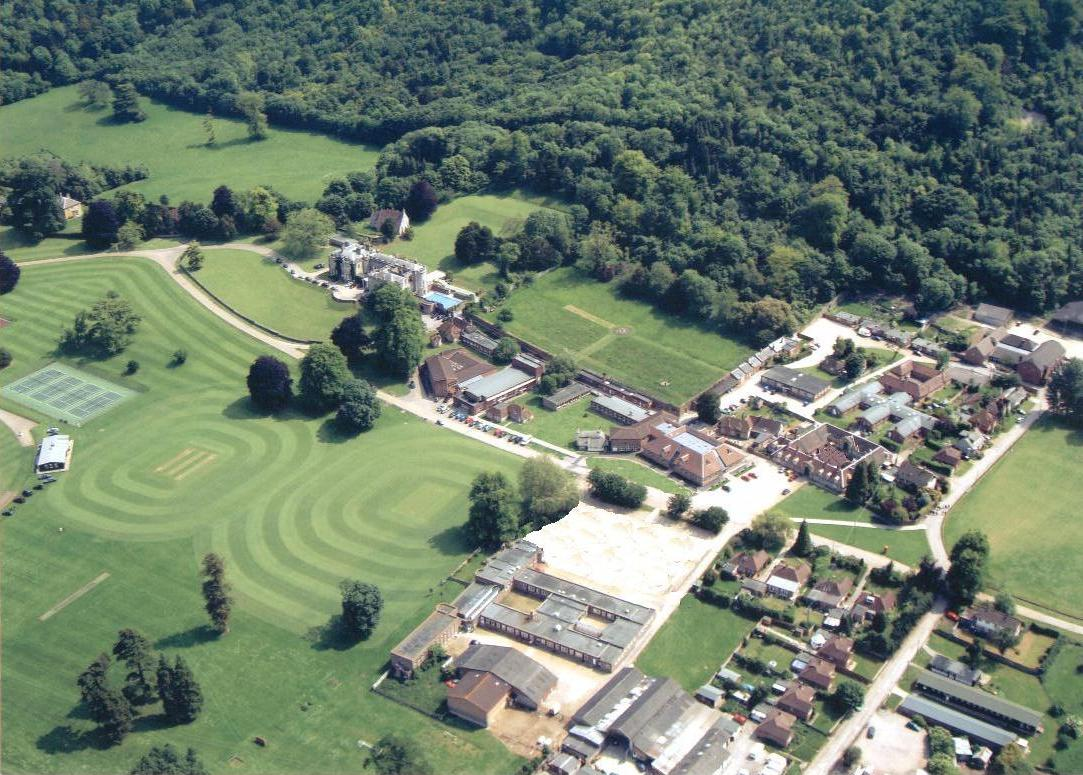
Aerial view of the campus

== Old Seafordians ==
=== Politics ===
- Ahmed Chalabi (1945–2015), President of the Iraqi Governing Council (2003) and Deputy Prime Minister of Iraq

=== Arts ===
- Anthony Buckeridge (1912–2004), children's author
- Lance Dossor (1916–2005), pianist
- Val Guest (1911–2006), film director
- Gareth Neame (b. 1967), television producer
- Tom Odell (b. 1990), singer
- Matthew Rose (b. 1978), opera singer
- Toby Stephens (b. 1969), actor

=== Sport ===
- Luc Benkenstein (b. 2004), Essex cricketer
- Mats Grambusch (b. 1992), Olympic medal-winning field hockey player
- Tom Grambusch (b. 1995), Olympic medal-winning field hockey player
- Jeremy Groome (b. 1955), former Sussex cricketer
- Nathan Jibulu (b. 2003), Harlequins rugby player
- Adrian Jones (b. 1961), former Sussex and Somerset cricketer
- David Purley (1945–1985), Formula One driver
- Christopher Rühr (b. 1993), Olympic medal-winning field hockey player
- Charlie Tear (b. 2004), Sussex and Scotland cricketer

=== Other ===
- Hugh Bentall (1920–2012), pioneer of open-heart surgery
- Sir Louis Blom-Cooper (1926–2018), lawyer and chairman of the Press Council
- Uri Dadush, economist
- Sir Roger De Haan (b. 1948), chairman of Saga Group
- Derek Marks (1921–1975), editor of the Daily Express (1965–1971)
- Tatiana Reed (b. 2002), automotive-based social media influencer

== Headmasters of Seaford ==
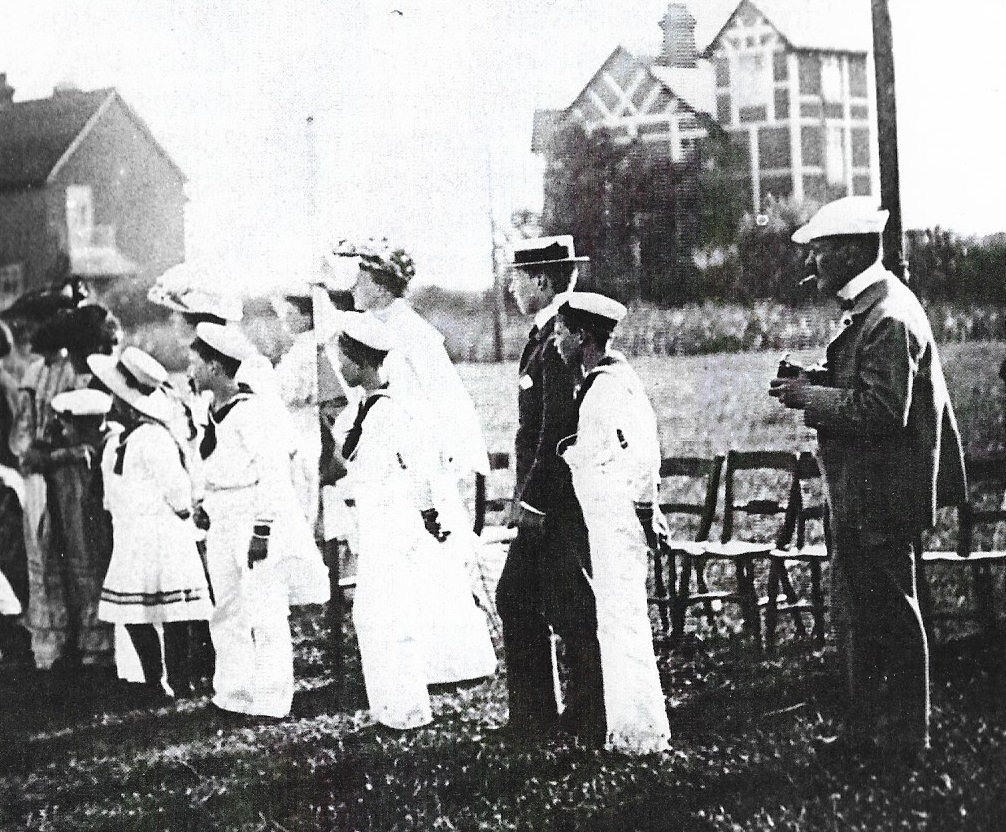
Colonel Frederick Savage (far right) and members of the Greek royal family watch on at a Seaford College sports day in 1909. Members of the Greek royal family served as patrons of the school.

- Colonel Frederick Savage (1884–1920)
- L.S.A Cowan (1920–1928)
- The Revd John Macnutt (1928–1931)
- The Revd William Hindley (1931–1935)
- W. Leslie Land (1935–1944)
- The Revd Charles Johnson (1944–1990)
- Charles Hannaford (1990–1996)
- Toby Mullins (1997–2013)
- John Green (2013–2026)
- Matt Williams (2026 - present)

== Notable associations ==
- Constantine II of Greece – patron
- George I of Greece – patron
- George II of Greece – patron
- Paul of Greece – patron
- Richard Chaloner, 1st Baron Gisborough – Chairman of Governors
- Bill Cuthbertson – housemaster
- Harold Maxwell-Lefroy – assistant master

== See also ==
- Grade II* listed buildings in West Sussex
