= Mauchsberg =

- Location within Mpumalanga Location within South Africa
- Coordinates: 25.172°S 30.474°E
- Country: South Africa
- Province: Mpumalanga
- District: Ehlanzeni
- Municipality: Thaba Chweu
- Time zone: UTC+2 (SAST)
- Area code: 013

Mauchsberg is a small village in Thaba Chweu Local Municipality of Mpumalanga province, South Africa.
