= British Expeditionary Force order of battle (1940) =

Military campaign during World War II

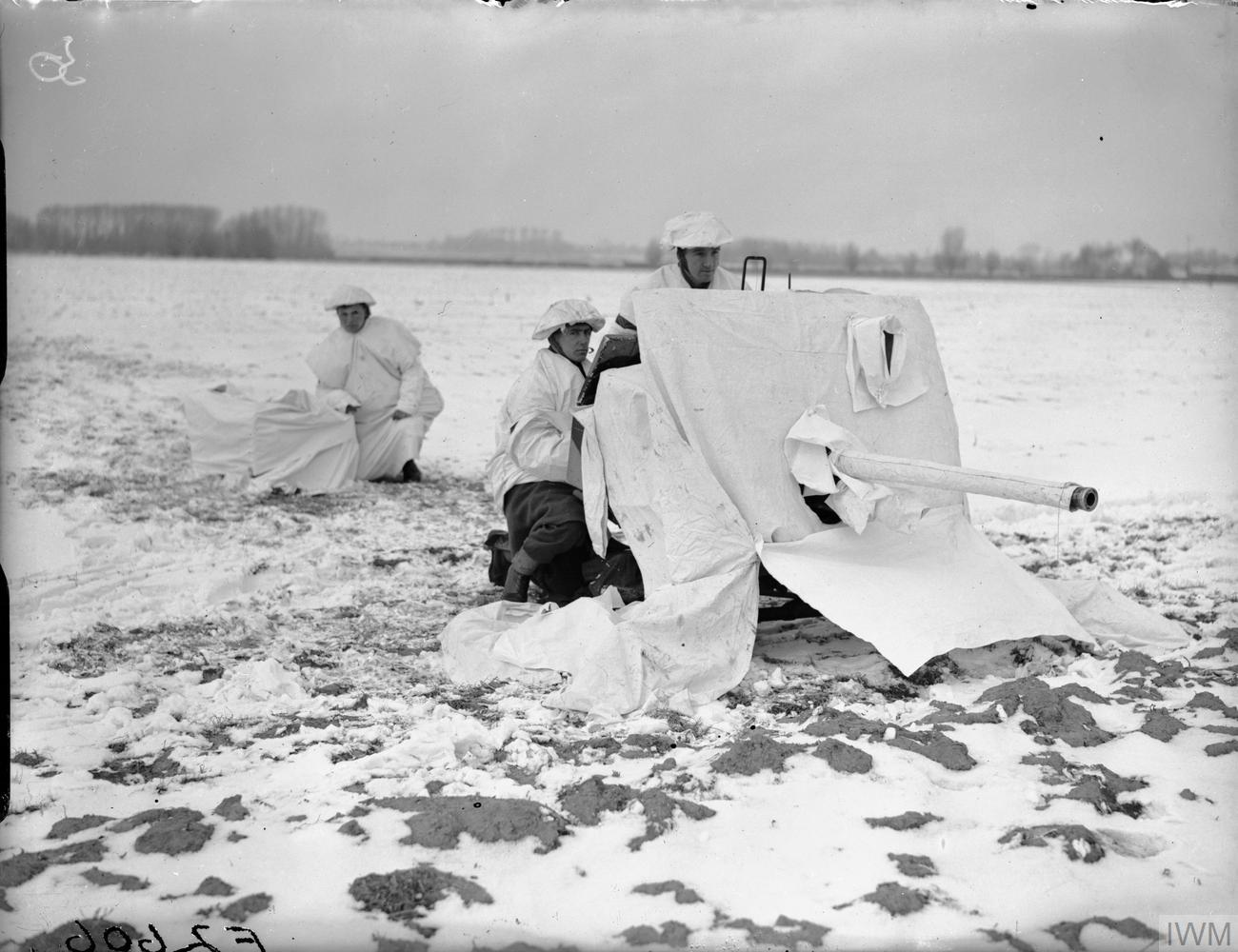
A 2-pdr anti-tank gun of 44 Battery, 13th Anti-Tank Regiment, 2nd Division in the snow near Beuvry, 15 February 1940. The crew wear snow suits and the gun is camouflaged with white sheets.

This is the British Expeditionary Force order of battle on 9 May 1940, the day before the German forces initiated the Battle of France.

== High-level order of battle ==
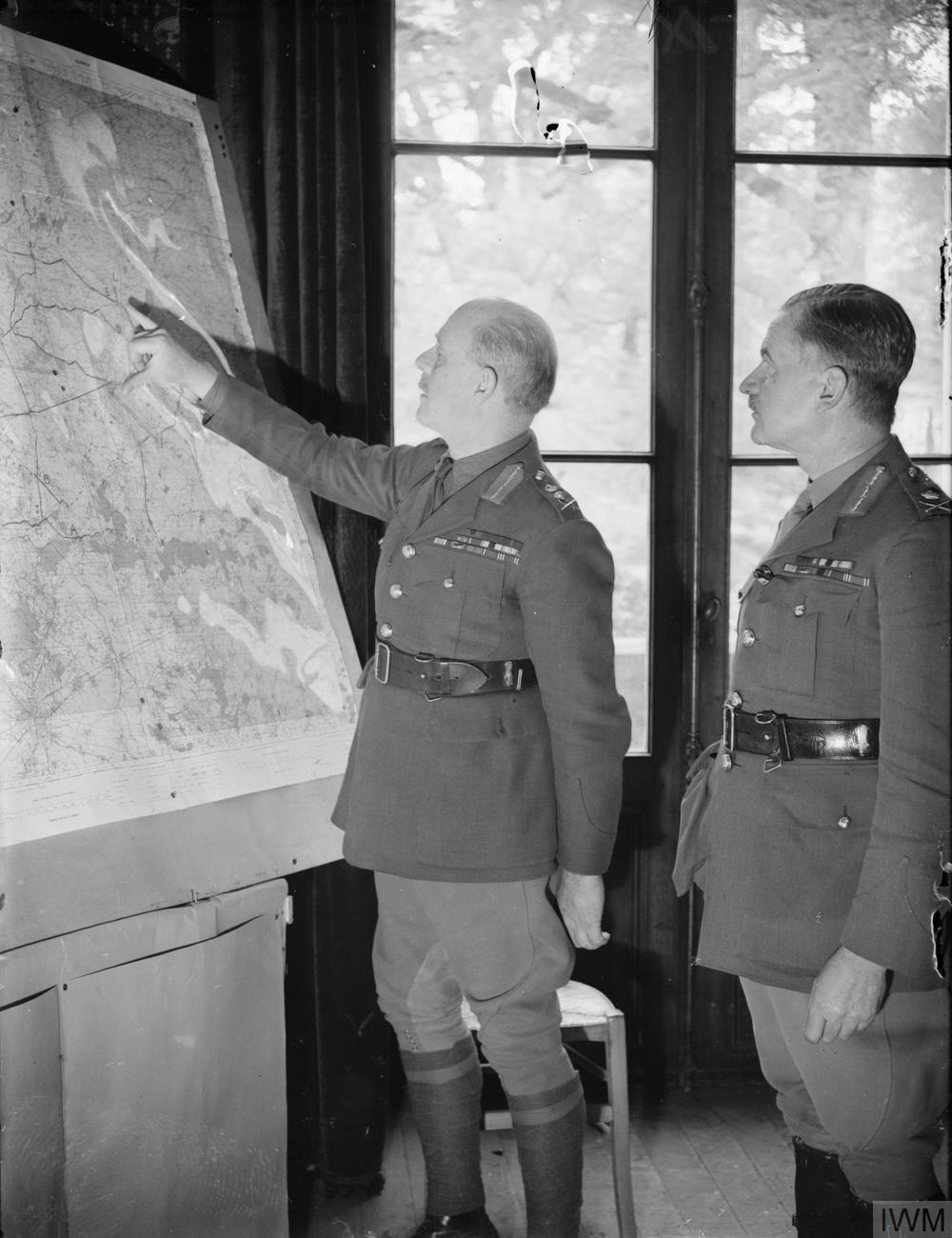
BEF commander Lord Gort and Chief of the General Staff Pownall study a map at GHQ in the Chateau at Harbarcq, 26 November 1939.

First Expeditionary Force

General John Vereker, 6th Viscount Gort

5th Infantry Division (Major-General Harold Franklyn)

I Corps (Lieutenant-General Michael Barker)

1st Infantry Division (Major-General Harold Rupert Leofric George Alexander)
2nd Infantry Division (Major-General Henry Charles Loyd)
48th (South Midland) Infantry Division (Major-General Augustus Francis Andrew Nicol Thorne)

II Corps (Lieutenant-General Alan Brooke)

3rd Infantry Division (Major-General Bernard Montgomery)
4th Infantry Division (Major-General Dudley Johnson)
50th (Northumbrian) Motor Infantry Division (Major-General Giffard Martel)

III Corps (Lieutenant-General Sir Ronald Forbes Adam

42nd (East Lancashire) Infantry Division (Major-General William Holmes)
44th (Home Counties) Infantry Division (Major-General Edmund Osborne)

Saar Force (Major-General Victor Fortune)

51st (Highland) Infantry Division (Major-General V. M. Fortune)

Formations undergoing training and performing labour duties
HQ Lines of Communication British Expeditionary Force (Major-General Philip de Fonblanque)
Units arriving in France after 10 May 1940

Other formations

Air Component
Second Expeditionary Force

== First Expeditionary Force ==
=== General Headquarters (GHQ) ===
General Officer Commanding-in-Chief: General John Vereker, 6th Viscount Gort
Chief of the General Staff: Lieutenant-General Sir Henry Royds Pownall
Adjutant General: Lieutenant-General Sir W. D. S. Brownrigg
Quartermaster General: Lieutenant-General W. G. Lindsell
Deputy Chief of the General Staff; Major-General Philip Neame
Major-General Royal Artillery: Major-General Sydney Rigby Wason
Engineer-in-Chief: Major-General Ridley Pakenham-Walsh

==== GHQ, BEF Headquarters Troops ====
GHQ-attached units

2nd Field Security Police Section Corps of Military Police
6th Field Security Police Section Corps of Military Police
30th Field Security Police Section Corps of Military Police
33rd Field Security Police Section Corps of Military Police
General Headquarters Signals, Royal Signals
2nd Wireless Company, Royal Signals

100th Special Wireless Section (Providing support for GHQ)
101st Special Wireless Section (Providing support for I Corps)
102nd Special Wireless Section (Providing support for II Corps)
103rd Special Wireless Section (Providing support for III Corps)

1st Air Formation Signals, Royal Signals
2nd Air Formation Signals, Royal Signals
1st Air Liaison Signals Section Royal Signals
4th Air Liaison Signals Section Royal Signals
6th Air Liaison Signals Section Royal Signals
7th Air Liaison Signals Section Royal Signals
12th (The Prince of Wales's) Royal Lancers
1st Battalion, Welsh Guards
7th Battalion, Cheshire Regiment (Machine-Guns)
14th Battalion, Royal Fusiliers (City of London Regiment) (company size) - garrison unit
8th Battalion, Middlesex Regiment (Duke of Cambridge's Own) (Machine-Guns)
9th Overseas Defence Battalion, West Yorkshire Regiment (Prince of Wales's Own) - garrison unit
6th (Argyllshire) Battalion, Argyll and Sutherland Highlanders (Princess Louises's Own) (Machine-Guns)
6th Battalion, King's Own Royal Regiment (Lancaster) (Pioneers)
7th Battalion, King's Own Royal Regiment (Lancaster) (Pioneers)
8th Battalion, King's Own Royal Regiment (Lancaster) (Pioneers)
6th Battalion, South Staffordshire Regiment (Pioneers)
5th Movement Control Group Royal Engineers
2nd Advanced Medical Depot, Royal Army Medical Corps
4th Advanced Medical Depot, Royal Army Medical Corps
9th Field Hygiene Section, Royal Army Medical Corps
2nd Casualty Clearing Station, Royal Army Medical Corps
3rd Casualty Clearing Station, Royal Army Medical Corps
9th Casualty Clearing Station, Royal Army Medical Corps
11th Casualty Clearing Station, Royal Army Medical Corps
13th Casualty Clearing Station, Royal Army Medical Corps
4th Motor Ambulance Convoy, Royal Army Medical Corps
5th Motor Ambulance Convoy, Royal Army Medical Corps
6th Motor Ambulance Convoy, Royal Army Medical Corps
8th Motor Ambulance Convoy, Royal Army Medical Corps

Headquarters, G.H.Q. Troops, Royal Army Service Corps

1st G.H.Q. Troops Company, Royal Army Service Corps
2nd G.H.Q. Troops Company, Royal Army Service Corps
3rd G.H.Q. Troops Company, Royal Army Service Corps
1st Lines of Communication Railhead Company, Royal Army Service Corps
2nd Lines of Communication Railhead Company, Royal Army Service Corps
2nd Supply Personnel Company, Royal Army Service Corps
3rd Petrol Depot, Royal Army Service Corps
1st Troop Carrying Company, Royal Army Service Corps
2nd Troop Carrying Company, Royal Army Service Corps
3rd Troop Carrying Company, Royal Army Service Corps
4th Troop Carrying Company, Royal Army Service Corps
9th Troop Carrying Company, Royal Army Service Corps
13th Troop Carrying Company, Royal Army Service Corps
14th Troop Carrying Company, Royal Army Service Corps
1st Motor Transport Works Services Company, Royal Army Service Corps
2nd Motor Transport Works Services Company, Royal Army Service Corps
3rd Motor Transport Works Services Company, Royal Army Service Corps
4th Motor Transport Works Services Company, Royal Army Service Corps

=== Armoured Brigades ===
1st Light Armoured Reconnaissance Brigade

Brigade manning armoured cars

1st Light Armoured Reconnaissance Brigade Headquarters and Signals Section, Royal Signals
1st Fife and Forfar Yeomanry
1st East Riding of Yorkshire Lancers

2nd Light Armoured Reconnaissance Brigade

Brigade manning armoured cars

2nd Light Armoured Reconnaissance Brigade Headquarters and Signals Section, Royal Signals
5th (Royal Inniskilling) Dragoon Guards
15th/19th (The King's) Royal Hussars

1st Army Tank Brigade

Brigade manning infantry and cavalry tank

1st Army Tank Brigade Headquarters and Signals Section, Royal Signals
4th Royal Tank Regiment
7th Royal Tank Regiment

=== Commander Royal Artillery ===
Direct reports

1st Medium Regiment, Royal Artillery
2nd Medium Regiment, Royal Artillery
4th Medium Regiment, Royal Artillery
58th (Suffolk) Medium Regiment, Royal Artillery
61st Carnarvon and Denbigh (Yeomanry) Medium Regiment, Royal Artillery
63rd (Midland) Medium Regiment, Royal Artillery
65th (Highland) Medium Regiment, Royal Artillery
1st Heavy Regiment, Royal Artillery
51st (Lowland) Heavy Regiment, Royal Artillery
52nd (Bedfordshire Yeomanry) Heavy Regiment, Royal Artillery
1st Super-Heavy Battery, Royal Artillery
2nd Super-Heavy Battery, Royal Artillery
3rd Super-Heavy Battery, Royal Artillery

1st Anti-Aircraft Brigade

1st Anti-Aircraft Brigade Headquarters and Signals Section, Royal Signals
1st Anti-Aircraft Regiment, Royal Artillery
6th Anti-Aircraft Regiment, Royal Artillery
85th (Tees) Anti-Aircraft Regiment, Royal Artillery

2nd Anti-Aircraft Brigade

2nd Anti-Aircraft Brigade Headquarters and Signals Section, Royal Signals
60th (City of London) Anti-Aircraft Regiment Royal Artillery
51st (Devon) Light Anti-Aircraft Regiment Royal Artillery
58th (Argyll and Sutherland Highlanders) Light Anti-Aircraft Regiment, Royal Artillery

3rd Anti-Aircraft Brigade

3rd Anti-Aircraft Brigade Headquarters and Signals Section, Royal Signals
2nd Anti-Aircraft Regiment Royal Artillery
8th (Belfast) Anti-Aircraft Regiment, Royal Artillery
79th (Hertfordshire Yeomanry) Anti-Aircraft Regiment, Royal Artillery
37th (Tyne Electrical Engineers) Searchlight Regiment, Royal Artillery
4th Light Anti-Aircraft Battery, Royal Artillery
174th Light Anti-Aircraft Battery, Royal Artillery

4th Anti-Aircraft Brigade

4th Anti-Aircraft Brigade Headquarters and Signals Section, Royal Signals
4th Anti-Aircraft Regiment, Royal Artillery
52nd (East Lancashire) Light Anti-Aircraft Regiment, Royal Artillery – from I Corps

5th Searchlight Brigade

5th Anti-Aircraft Brigade Headquarters and Signals Section, Royal Signals
1st Searchlight Regiment, Royal Artillery
2nd Searchlight Regiment, Royal Artillery
3rd (Ulster) Searchlight Regiment, Royal Artillery

=== Commander Royal Engineers ===
Major-General Ridley Pakenham Pakenham-Walsh

Direct reports

100th (Monmouthshire) Army Field Company, Royal Monmouthshire Royal Engineers
101st (Monmouthshire) Army Field Company, Royal Monmouthshire Royal Engineers
216th (1st London) Army Field Company, Royal Engineers
228th (West Riding) Field Company, Royal Engineers
242nd (Lowland) Field Company, Royal Engineers
223rd (2nd London) Field Park Company, Royal Engineers
109th Workshop and Park Company, Royal Engineers
1st Army Troops Company, Royal Engineers
2nd Army Troops Company, Royal Engineers
19th Army Field Survey Company, Royal Engineers
119th Road Construction Company, Royal Engineers
135th Excavator Company, Royal Engineers
1st Boring Section, Royal Engineers
2nd Boring Section, Royal Engineers
1st Anti-Gas Laboratory, Royal Engineers
58th (Chemical Warfare) Company, Royal Engineers
61st (Chemical Warfare) Company, Royal Engineers
62nd (Chemical Warfare) Company, Royal Engineers

1st Tunnelling Group, Royal Engineers

170th Tunnelling Company, Royal Engineers
171st Tunnelling Company, Royal Engineers
172nd Tunnelling Company, Royal Engineers
173rd Tunnelling Company, Royal Engineers

=== 5th Infantry Division ===
Major-General Harold Franklyn

Division-level units

5th Infantry Division Headquarters and Employment Platoon, Royal Pioneer Corps
5th Infantry Divisional Field Cash Office, Royal Army Pay Corps
5th Divisional Signals, Royal Signals
9th Battalion, The Manchester Regiment
5th Infantry Divisional Field Post Office, Royal Engineers
9th Mobile Bath Unit, Royal Army Ordnance Corps (Note: Attached from I Corps.)
5th Infantry Divisional Provost Company, Corps of Military Police

13th Infantry Brigade

13th Infantry Brigade Headquarters and Signals Section, Royal Signals
2nd Battalion, The Cameronians (Scottish Rifles)
2nd Battalion, The Royal Inniskilling Fusiliers
2nd Battalion, The Wiltshire Regiment
13th Infantry Brigade Anti-Tank Company

17th Infantry Brigade

17th Infantry Brigade Headquarters and Signals Section, Royal Signals
2nd Battalion, The Royal Scots Fusiliers
2nd Battalion, The Northamptonshire Regiment
6th (Morayshire) Battalion, The Duke of Albany's Seaforth Highlanders (The Ross-shire Buffs)
17th Infantry Brigade Anti-Tank Company

Commander Royal Artillery, 5th Division

Commander Royal Artillery, 5th Division HQ
9th Field Regiment, Royal Artillery
91st (4th London) Field Regiment, Royal Artillery
92nd (5th London) Field Regiment, Royal Artillery
52nd (6th London) Anti-Tank Regiment, Royal Artillery

Commander Royal Engineers, 5th Division

Commander Royal Engineers, 5th Division HQ
38th Field Company, Royal Engineers
245th (Welsh) Field Company, Royal Engineers
252nd (West Lancashire) Field Company, Royal Engineers
254th (West Lancashire) Field Park Company, Royal Engineers

Commander Royal Army Service Corps, 5th Division

5th Infantry Divisional Royal Army Service Corps HQ
5th Infantry Divisional Ammunition Company, Royal Army Service Corps
5th Infantry Divisional Petrol Company, Royal Army Service Corps
5th Infantry Divisional Supply Column, Royal Army Service Corps

Commander Royal Army Medical Corps, 5th Division

5th Infantry Divisional Royal Army Medical Corps HQ
141st (County of London) Field Ambulance, Royal Army Medical Corps
158th (Welsh) Field Ambulance, Royal Army Medical Corps
164th (West Lancashire) Field Ambulance, Royal Army Medical Corps
24th Field Hygiene Section, Royal Army Medical Corps

=== I Corps ===
Lieutenant-General Michael Barker

Corps-level units

I Corps Signals, Royal Corps of Signals
I Corps Postal Unit, Royal Engineers
4th (The Earl of Chester's) Battalion, Cheshire Regiment (Machine-Guns)
2nd Battalion, Manchester Regiment (Machine-Guns)
I Corps Troops Ammunition Column, Royal Army Service Corps
I Corps Ammunition Company, Royal Army Service Corps
I Corps Supply Column, Royal Army Service Corps
I Corps Petrol Park, Royal Army Service Corps
1st Reception Camp
1st Storage Unit
2nd Storage Unit
3rd Storage Unit
8th Storage Unit

Corps Headquarters Troop, I Corps

1st Field Cash Office, Royal Army Pay Corps
2nd Field Cash Office, Royal Army Pay Corps
3rd Field Cash Office, Royal Army Pay Corps
48th Field Cash Office, Royal Army Pay Corps

==== I Corps Troops, Royal Engineers ====
Direct reports

102nd (London) Army Field Company, Royal Engineers
107th (North Riding) Army Field Company, Royal Engineers
221st (2nd London) Field Company, Royal Engineers
105th Army Field Park Company, Royal Engineers
13th Corps Field Survey Company, Royal Engineers
1st Troop Carrying Company, Royal Army Service Corps
3rd Troop Carrying Company, Royal Army Service Corps
1 [Cypriot] (Mule) Pack Transport Company, Royal Army Service Corps
32 Animal Transport Company Royal Indian Army Service Corps
5th Section from 1 Supply Personnel Company, Royal Army Service Corps
6th Section from 1 Supply Personnel Company, Royal Army Service Corps
32nd Section from 2 Supply Personnel Company, Royal Army Service Corps
1st Motor Ambulance Convoy, Royal Army Service Corps
1st Ordnance Field Park, Royal Army Ordnance Corps
1st Army Field Workshop, Royal Army Ordnance Corps
2nd Army Field Workshop, Royal Army Ordnance Corps
11th Army Field Workshop, Royal Army Ordnance Corps
7th Mobile Bath Unit, Royal Army Ordnance Corps
13th Field Ambulance, Royal Army Medical Corps
6th Field Hygiene Section, Royal Army Medical Corps
1st Advanced Medical Stores Depôt, Royal Army Medical Corps
1st Mobile Hygiene Laboratory, Royal Army Medical Corps
1st Mobile Bacteriological Laboratory, Royal Army Medical Corps
1st Casualty Clearing Station, Royal Army Medical Corps
8th Casualty Clearing Station, Royal Army Medical Corps
102nd Provost Company, Corps of Military Police

1st General Construction Group, Royal Engineers

660th General Construction Company, Royal Engineers
661st General Construction Company, Royal Engineers
667th General Construction Company, Royal Engineers
223rd (2nd London) Field Park Company, Royal Engineers

12 Group, Auxiliary Military Pioneer Corps

44 Company, Auxiliary Military Pioneer Corps
45 Company, Auxiliary Military Pioneer Corps
61 Company, Auxiliary Military Pioneer Corps

==== I Corps Artillery Troops ====
1st Survey Regiment, Royal Artillery
1st General Headquarters Artillery Company, Royal Army Service Corps

I Corps Commander Royal Artillery

Commander Corps Artillery Royal Artillery, I Corps

115th (North Midland) Field Regiment, Royal Artillery
140th (5th London) Field Regiment, Royal Artillery
1st Medium Regiment, Royal Artillery
61st (Caernarvon & Denbigh Yeomanry) Medium Regiment, Royal Artillery
52nd (East Lancashire) Light Anti-Aircraft Regiment, Royal Artillery

I Corps Commander Medium Artillery

Commander Corps Medium Artillery, I Corps

27th Field Regiment, Royal Artillery
98th (Surrey and Sussex Yeomanry) Field Regiment, Royal Artillery
3rd Medium Regiment, Royal Artillery
5th Medium Regiment, Royal Artillery
63rd (Highland) Medium Regiment, Royal Artillery
1st Heavy Regiment, Royal Artillery
3rd Super-Heavy Battery, Royal Artillery

==== 1st Infantry Division ====
Major-General Harold Rupert Leofric George Alexander

Division-level units

1st Infantry Division Headquarters and Employment Platoon
1st Infantry Divisional Field Cash Office, Royal Army Pay Corps
1st Divisional Signals, Royal Corps of Signals
13th/18th Royal Hussars (Note: Attached from G.H.Q. Troops.)
2nd Battalion, Cheshire Regiment (Machine-Guns)
4th (City of Aberdeen) Battalion, Gordon Highlanders (Machine-Guns)
1st Infantry Divisional Field Post Office, Royal Engineers
1st Mobile Bath Unit, Royal Army Ordnance Corps
1st Provost Company, Corps of Military Police

1st (Guards) Infantry Brigade

1st (Guards) Infantry Brigade Headquarters and Signals Section, Royal Signals
3rd Battalion, Grenadier Guards
2nd Battalion, Coldstream Guards
2nd Battalion, Hampshire Regiment
1st Guards Brigade Anti-Tank Company

2nd Infantry Brigade

2nd Infantry Brigade Headquarters and Signals Section, Royal Signals
1st Battalion, Loyal North Lancashire Regiment
2nd Battalion, North Staffordshire Regiment (Prince of Wales's)
6th (Banffshire) Battalion, Gordon Highlanders
2nd Infantry Brigade Anti-Tank Company

3rd Infantry Brigade

3rd Infantry Brigade Headquarters and Signals Section, Royal Signals
1st Battalion, Duke of Wellington's Regiment (West Riding)
2nd Battalion, Sherwood Foresters
1st Battalion, King's Shropshire Light Infantry
3rd Infantry Brigade Anti-Tank Company

Commander Royal Artillery, 1st Division

1st Infantry Divisional Artillery HQ
2nd Field Regiment, Royal Artillery
19th Field Regiment, Royal Artillery
67th (South Midland) Field Regiment, Royal Artillery
21st Anti-Tank Regiment, Royal Artillery

Commander Royal Engineers, 1st Division

1st Infantry Divisional Royal Engineers HQ
23rd Field Company, Royal Engineers
238th (County of Renfrewshire, Highland) Field Company, Royal Engineers
248th (East Anglian) Field Company, Royal Engineers
6th Field Park Company, Royal Engineers

Commander Royal Army Service Corps, 1st Division

1st Infantry Divisional Royal Army Service Corps HQ
1st Infantry Divisional Ammunition Company, Royal Army Service Corps
1st Infantry Divisional Petrol Company, Royal Army Service Corps
1st Infantry Divisional Supply Column, Royal Army Service Corps

Commander Royal Army Medical Corps, 1st Division

1st Infantry Divisional Royal Army Medical Corps HQ
1st Field Ambulance, Royal Army Medical Corps
2nd Field Ambulance, Royal Army Medical Corps
3rd Field Ambulance, Royal Army Medical Corps
1st Field Hygiene Section, Royal Army Medical Corps

==== 2nd Infantry Division ====
Major-General Henry Charles Loyd

Division-level units

2nd Infantry Division Headquarters and Employment Platoon
2nd Infantry Divisional Field Cash Office, Royal Army Pay Corps
2nd Divisional Signals, Royal Corps of Signals
4th/7th Royal Dragoon Guards
2nd Battalion, Manchester Regiment (Machine-Guns)
2nd Infantry Divisional Field Post Office, Royal Engineers
2nd Mobile Bath Unit, Royal Army Ordnance Corps
2nd Company, Corps of Military Police

4th Infantry Brigade

4th Infantry Brigade Headquarters and Signals Section, Royal Signals
1st Battalion, Royal Scots
2nd Battalion, Royal Norfolk Regiment
8th Battalion, Lancashire Fusiliers
4th Infantry Brigade Anti-Tank Company

5th Infantry Brigade

5th Infantry Brigade Headquarters and Signals Section, Royal Signals
7th Battalion, Worcestershire Regiment
2nd Battalion, Dorsetshire Regiment
1st Battalion, Queen's Own Cameron Highlanders
5th Infantry Brigade Anti-Tank Company

6th Infantry Brigade

6th Infantry Brigade Headquarters and Signals Section, Royal Signals
1st Battalion, Royal Welch Fusiliers
1st Battalion, Royal Berkshire Regiment (Princess Charlotte of Wales's)
2nd Battalion, Durham Light Infantry
6th Infantry Brigade Anti-Tank Company

Commander Royal Artillery, 2nd Division

2nd Infantry Divisional Royal Artillery HQ
10th Field Regiment, Royal Artillery
16th Field Regiment, Royal Artillery
99th (Buckinghamshire Yeomanry) Field Regiment, Royal Artillery
13th Anti-Tank Regiment, Royal Artillery

Commander Royal Engineers, 2nd Division

2nd Infantry Divisional Royal Engineers HQ
5th Field Company, Royal Engineers
208th (Sussex) Field Company, Royal Engineers
506th Field Company, Royal Engineers
21st Field Park Company, Royal Engineers

Commander Royal Army Service Corps, 2nd Division

2nd Infantry Divisional Royal Army Service Corps HQ
2nd Infantry Divisional Ammunition Company, Royal Army Service Corps
2nd Infantry Divisional Petrol Company, Royal Army Service Corps
2nd Infantry Divisional Supply Column, Royal Army Service Corps

Commander Royal Army Medical Corps, 2nd Division

2nd Infantry Divisional Royal Army Medical Corps HQ
4th Field Ambulance, Royal Army Medical Corps
5th Field Ambulance, Royal Army Medical Corps
6th Field Ambulance, Royal Army Medical Corps
2nd Field Hygiene Section, Royal Army Medical Corps

==== 48th (South Midland) Infantry Division ====
Major-General Augustus Francis Andrew Nicol Thorne

Division-level units

48th (South Midland) Infantry Division Headquarters and Employment Platoon
48th (South Midland) Divisional Field Cash Office, Royal Army Pay Corps
48th (South Midland) Divisional Signals, Royal Corps of Signals
4th Battalion, Cheshire Regiment
48th (South Midland) Divisional Field Post Office, Royal Engineers
14th Mobile Bath Unit, Royal Army Ordnance Corps
48th (South Midland) Divisional Provost Company, Corps of Military Police

143rd Infantry Brigade

143rd Infantry Brigade Headquarters and Signals Section, Royal Signals
1st Battalion, Oxfordshire and Buckinghamshire Light Infantry
7th Battalion, Royal Warwickshire Regiment
8th Battalion, The Royal Warwickshire Regiment
143rd Infantry Brigade Anti-Tank Company

144th Infantry Brigade

144th Infantry Brigade Headquarters and Signals Section, Royal Signals
2nd Battalion, Royal Warwickshire Regiment
5th Battalion, Gloucestershire Regiment
8th Battalion, Worcestershire Regiment
144th Infantry Brigade Anti-Tank Company

145th Infantry Brigade

145th Infantry Brigade Headquarters and Signals Section, Royal Signals
2nd Battalion, Gloucestershire Regiment
1st (Buckinghamshire) Battalion, Oxfordshire and Buckinghamshire Light Infantry
4th Battalion, Oxfordshire and Buckinghamshire Light Infantry
145th Infantry Brigade Anti-Tank Company

Commander Royal Artillery, 48th Division

48th (South Midland) Divisional Royal Artillery HQ
18th Field Regiment, Royal Artillery
24th Field Regiment, Royal Artillery
68th (South Midland) Field Regiment, Royal Artillery
53rd (Worcestershire and Oxfordshire Yeomanry) Anti-Tank Regiment, Royal Artillery

Commander Royal Engineers, 48th Division

48th (South Midland) Divisional Royal Engineers HQ
9th Field Company, Royal Engineers
224th (South Midland) Field Company, Royal Engineers
226th (South Midland) Field Company, Royal Engineers
227th (South Midland) Field Park Company, Royal Engineers

Commander Royal Army Service Corps, 48th Division

48th (South Midland) Infantry Divisional Royal Army Service Corps HQ
48th (South Midland) Infantry Divisional Ammunition Company, Royal Army Service Corps
48th (South Midland) Infantry Divisional Petrol Company, Royal Army Service Corps
48th (South Midland) Infantry Divisional Supply Column, Royal Army Service Corps

Commander Royal Army Medical Corps, 48th Division

48th (South Midland) Infantry Divisional Royal Army Medical Corps HQ
143rd (South Midland) Field Ambulance, Royal Army Medical Corps
144th (South Midland) Field Ambulance, Royal Army Medical Corps
145th (South Midland) Field Ambulance, Royal Army Medical Corps
12th Field Hygiene Section, Royal Army Medical Corps

=== II Corps ===
Lieutenant-General Alan Brooke

Corps-level units

4th Field Cash Office, Royal Army Pay Corps
5th, Royal Army Pay Corps
6th, Royal Army Pay Corps
II Corps Signals, Royal Signals
2nd Battalion, Royal Northumberland Fusiliers (Machine-Guns)
2nd Battalion, Middlesex Regiment (Duke of Cambridge's Own) (Machine-Guns)
7th Battalion, Middlesex Regiment (Duke of Cambridge's Own) (Machine-Guns)
II Corps Postal Unit, Royal Engineers
II Corps Troops Ammunition Column, Royal Army Service Corps
II Corps Ammunition Company, Royal Army Service Corps
II Corps Supply Column, Royal Army Service Corps
II Corps Petrol Park, Royal Army Service Corps
II Corps Motor Ambulance Convoy, Royal Army Service Corps
3rd Section from 1 Supply Personnel Company, Royal Army Service Corps
18th Section from 2 Supply Personnel Company, Royal Army Service Corps
33rd Section from 2 Supply Personnel Company, Royal Army Service Corps
2 [Cypriot] (Mule) Pack Transport Company, Royal Army Service Corps
25 Animal Transport Company Royal Indian Army Service Corps
3rd Ordnance Field Park, Royal Army Ordnance Corps
2nd Army Field Workshop, Royal Army Ordnance Corps
8th Army Field Workshop, Royal Army Ordnance Corps
14th Army Field Workshop, Royal Army Ordnance Corps
6th Mobile Bath Unit, Royal Army Ordnance Corps
14th Field Ambulance, Royal Army Medical Corps
7th Field Hygiene Section, Royal Army Medical Corps
3rd Advanced Medical Stores Depot, Royal Army Medical Corps
2nd Mobile Hygiene Laboratory, Royal Army Medical Corps
2nd Mobile Bacteriological Laboratory, Royal Army Medical Corps
5th Casualty Clearing Station, Royal Army Medical Corps
6th Casualty Clearing Station, Royal Army Medical Corps
103 Provost Company, Corps of Military Police
2nd Reception Camp
4th Storage Unit
5th Storage Unit
6th Storage Unit
13th Storage Unit

II Corps Headquarters Troops

4th Field Security Police Section, Corps of Military Police
5th Field Security Police Section, Corps of Military Police
8th Field Security Police Section, Corps of Military Police
12th Field Security Police Section, Corps of Military Police
20th Field Security Police Section, Corps of Military Police
2nd Air Intelligence Section
8th Air Intelligence Section
5th Employment Platoon

==== II Corps Troops, Royal Engineers ====
222nd (2nd London) Army Field Company, Royal Engineers
234th (Northumbrian) Army Field Company, Royal Engineers
240th (Lowland) Army Field Company, Royal Engineers
108th (Essex) Corps Field Park, Royal Engineers
14th Corps Survey Company, Royal Engineers

2nd General Construction Group, Royal Engineers

660th General Construction Company, Royal Engineers
661st General Construction Company, Royal Engineers
667th General Construction Company, Royal Engineers
223rd (2nd London) Field Park Company, Royal Engineers

11 Group, Auxiliary Military Pioneer Corps

40 Company, Auxiliary Military Pioneer Corps
42 Company, Auxiliary Military Pioneer Corps
60 Company, Auxiliary Military Pioneer Corps

==== II Corps Artillery Troops ====
2nd Survey Regiment, Royal Artillery
2nd General Headquarters Artillery Company, Royal Army Service Corps

II Corps Commander, Royal Artillery

60th (North Midland) Army Field Regiment, Royal Artillery
88th (2nd West Lancashire) Army Field Regiment, Royal Artillery
53rd (London) Medium Regiment, Royal Artillery
59th (4th West Lancashire) Medium Regiment, Royal Artillery
53rd (King's Own Yorkshire Light Infantry) Light Anti-Aircraft Regiment, Royal Artillery

II Corps Commander, Medium Artillery

2nd Regiment, Royal Horse Artillery (Field)
32nd Army Field Regiment, Royal Artillery
2nd Medium Regiment, Royal Artillery
4th Medium Regiment, Royal Artillery
58th (Suffolk) Medium Regiment, Royal Artillery
51st (Lowland) Heavy Regiment, Royal Artillery
2nd Super Heavy Battery, Royal Artillery

==== 3rd Infantry Division ====
Major-General Bernard Montgomery

Division-level units

3rd Infantry Division Headquarters and Employment Platoon
3rd Infantry Divisional Field Cash Office, Royal Army Pay Corps
3rd Divisional Signals, Royal Corps of Signals
2nd Battalion, Middlesex Regiment (Duke of Cambridge's Own)
7th Battalion, Middlesex Regiment (Duke of Cambridge's Own)
3rd Infantry Divisional Field Post Office, Royal Engineers
3rd Mobile Bath Unit, Royal Army Ordnance Corps
3rd Infantry Divisional Provost Company, Corps of Military Police

7th (Guards) Infantry Brigade

7th (Guards) Infantry Brigade Headquarters and Signal Section, Royal Signals
1st Battalion, Grenadier Guards
2nd Battalion, Grenadier Guards
1st Battalion, Coldstream Guards
7th (Guards) Infantry Brigade Anti-Tank Company

8th Infantry Brigade

8th Infantry Brigade Headquarters and Signal Section, Royal Signals
1st Battalion, Suffolk Regiment
2nd Battalion, East Yorkshire Regiment (Duke of York's Own)
4th Battalion, Royal Berkshire Regiment (Princess Charlotte of Wales's)
8th Infantry Brigade Anti-Tank Company

9th Infantry Brigade

9th Infantry Brigade Headquarters and Signal Section, Royal Signals
2nd Battalion, Lincolnshire Regiment
1st Battalion, King's Own Scottish Borderers
2nd Battalion, Royal Ulster Rifles
9th Infantry Brigade Anti-Tank Company

Commander Royal Artillery, 3rd Division

3rd Infantry Division Royal Artillery Headquarters
7th Field Regiment, Royal Artillery
33rd Field Regiment, Royal Artillery
76th (Highland) Field Regiment, Royal Artillery
20th Anti-Tank Regiment, Royal Artillery

Commander Royal Engineers, 3rd Division

Headquarters, 3rd Infantry Divisional Royal Engineers
17th Field Company, Royal Engineers
246th (Welsh) Field Company, Royal Engineers
253rd (West Lancashire) Field Company, Royal Engineers
15th Field Park Company, Royal Engineers

Commander Royal Army Service Corps, 3rd Division

Headquarters, 3rd Infantry Divisional Royal Army Service Corps
3rd Infantry Divisional, Royal Army Service Corps
3rd Infantry Divisional Ammunition Company, Royal Army Service Corps
3rd Infantry Divisional Petrol Company, Royal Army Service Corps
3rd Infantry Divisional Supply Column, Royal Army Service Corps

Commander Royal Army Medical Corps, 3rd Division

Headquarters, 3rd Infantry Divisional Royal Army Medical Corps
7th Field Ambulance, Royal Army Medical Corps
8th Field Ambulance, Royal Army Medical Corps
9th Field Ambulance, Royal Army Medical Corps
3rd Field Hygiene Section, Royal Army Medical Corps

==== 4th Infantry Division ====
Major-General Dudley Johnson

Division-level units

4th Infantry Division Headquarters and Employment Platoon
4th Infantry Divisional Field Cash Office, Royal Army Pay Corps
4th Divisional Signals, Royal Corps of Signals
2nd Battalion, Royal Northumberland Fusiliers (Note: Attached from II Corps Troops)
4th Infantry Divisional Field Post Office, Royal Engineers
13th Mobile Bath Unit, Royal Army Medical Corps
4th Infantry Divisional Provost Company, Corps of Military Police

10th Infantry Brigade

10th Infantry Brigade Headquarters and Signals Section, Royal Signals
2nd Battalion, Bedfordshire and Hertfordshire Regiment
6th Battalion, East Surrey Regiment
2nd Battalion, Duke of Cornwall's Light Infantry
10th Infantry Brigade Anti-Tank Company

11th Infantry Brigade

11th Infantry Brigade Headquarters and Signals Section, Royal Signals
2nd Battalion, Lancashire Fusiliers
1st Battalion, East Surrey Regiment
5th (Huntingdonshire) Battalion, Northamptonshire Regiment
11th Infantry Brigade Anti-Tank Company

12th Infantry Brigade

12th Infantry Brigade Headquarters and Signals Section, Royal Signals
2nd Battalion, Royal Fusiliers (City of London Regiment)
1st Battalion, The South Lancashire Regiment
6th (Perthshire) Battalion, The Black Watch (Royal Highland Regiment)
12th Infantry Brigade Anti-Tank Company

Commander Royal Artillery, 4th Division

4th Infantry Divisional Royal Artillery HQ
22nd Field Regiment, Royal Artillery
30th Field Regiment, Royal Artillery
77th (Highland) Field Regiment, Royal Artillery
14th Anti-Tank Regiment, Royal Artillery

Commander Royal Engineers, 4th Division

4th Infantry Divisional Royal Engineers HQ
7th Field Company, Royal Engineers
59th Field Company, Royal Engineers
225th (South Midland) Field Company, Royal Engineers
18th Field Park Company, Royal Engineers

Commander Royal Army Service Corps, 4th Division

4th Infantry Divisional Royal Army Service Corps HQ
4th Infantry Divisional Ammunition Company, Royal Army Service Corps
4th Infantry Divisional Petrol Company, Royal Army Service Corps
4th Infantry Divisional Supply Column, Royal Army Service Corps

Commander Royal Army Medical Corps, 4th Division

4th Infantry Divisional Royal Army Medical Corps HQ
10th Field Ambulance, Royal Army Medical Corps
11th Field Ambulance, Royal Army Medical Corps
12th Field Ambulance, Royal Army Medical Corps
4th Field Hygiene Section, Royal Army Medical Corps

==== 50th (Northumbrian) Motor Infantry Division ====
Major-General Giffard Martel

Division-level units

50th Infantry Division Headquarters and Employment Platoon
50th (Northumbrian) Infantry Divisional Field Cash Office, Royal Army Pay Corps
50th (Northumbrian) Divisional Signals, Royal Signals
4th Battalion, Royal Northumberland Fusiliers—Divisional motorcycle reconnaissance unit
50th (Northumbrian) Infantry Divisional Field Post Office, Royal Engineers
unknown #, Royal Army Ordnance Corps
50th (Northumbrian) Infantry Divisional Provost Company, Corps of Military Police

25th Infantry Brigade

25th Infantry Brigade Headquarters and Signals Section, Royal Signals
2nd Battalion, Essex Regiment
1st Battalion, Royal Irish Fusiliers
7th (Southwark) Battalion, Queen's Royal West Surrey Regiment

150th Infantry Brigade

150th Infantry Brigade Headquarters and Signals Section, Royal Signals
4th Battalion, East Yorkshire Regiment (Duke of York's Own)
4th Battalion, Alexandra, Princess of Wales Own Yorkshire Regiment (Green Howards)
5th Battalion, Alexandra, Princess of Wales Own Yorkshire Regiment (Green Howards)

151st Infantry Brigade

151st Infantry Brigade Headquarters and Signals Section, Royal Signals
6th Battalion, Durham Light Infantry
8th Battalion, Durham Light Infantry
9th Battalion, Durham Light Infantry

Commander Royal Artillery, 50th Division

50th (Northumbrian) Infantry Divisional Royal Artillery HQ
72nd (Northumbrian) Field Regiment, Royal Artillery
74th (Northumbrian) Field Regiment, Royal Artillery
65th (Norfolk Yeomanry) Anti-Tank Regiment, Royal Artillery

Commander Royal Engineers, 50th Division

50th (Northumbrian) Divisional Engineers HQ
232nd (Northumbrian) Field Company, Royal Engineers
505th Field Company, Royal Engineers
235th (Northumbrian) Field Park Company, Royal Engineers

Commander Royal Army Service Corps, 50th Division

50th (Northumbrian) Infantry Divisional Royal Army Service Corps HQ
50th (Northumbrian) Infantry Divisional Ammunition Company, Royal Army Service Corps
50th (Northumbrian) Infantry Divisional Petrol Company, Royal Army Service Corps
50th (Northumbrian) Infantry Divisional Supply Column, Royal Army Service Corps

Commander Royal Army Medical Corps, 50th Division

50th (Northumbrian) Infantry Divisional Royal Army Medical Corps HQ
149th (Northumbrian) Field Ambulance, Royal Army Medical Corps
150th (Northumbrian) Field Ambulance, Royal Army Medical Corps
183rd Field Ambulance, Royal Army Medical Corps
22nd Field Hygiene Section, Royal Army Medical Corps

=== III Corps ===
Lieutenant-General Sir Ronald Forbes Adam

==== III Corps Headquarters, Troops ====
III Corps Cash Office, Royal Army Pay Corps
44th Field Cash Office, Royal Army Pay Corps
III Corps Signals, Royal Corps of Signals
1/9th Battalion, The Manchester Regiment (Machine-Guns)
III Corps Postal Unit, Royal Engineers
III Corps Troops Ammunition Column, Royal Army Service Corps
III Corps Ammunition Company, Royal Army Service Corps
III Corps Supply Column, Royal Army Service Corps
III Corps Petrol Park, Royal Army Service Corps
2nd Ambulance Car Convoy, Royal Army Service Corps
4th Ordnance Field Park, Royal Army Ordnance Corps
4th Army Field Workshop, Royal Army Ordnance Corps
9th Army Field Workshop, Royal Army Ordnance Corps
15th Mobile Bath Unit, Royal Army Ordnance Corps
159th Field Ambulance, Royal Army Medical Corps
23rd Field Hygiene Section, Royal Army Medical Corps
10th Casualty Clearing Station, Royal Army Medical Corps
12th Casualty Clearing Station, Royal Army Medical Corps
104 Provost Company, Corps of Military Police
78 Company, Auxiliary Military Pioneer Corps
3rd Reception Camp
7th Storage Unit
9th Storage Unit
12th Storage Unit

==== Commander Royal Engineers, III Corps ====
214th (North Midland) Army Field Company, Royal Engineers
217th (1st London) Army Field Company, Royal Engineers
293rd Corps Field Park Company, Royal Engineers
668th General Construction Company, Royal Engineers
514th Corps Field Survey Company, Royal Engineers

==== Commander Royal Artillery, III Corps ====
3rd Survey Regiment, Royal Artillery
3rd General Headquarters Artillery Company, Royal Army Service Corps
4th General Headquarters Artillery Company, Royal Army Service Corps

Commander Royal Artillery, III Corps

III Corps Royal Artillery HQ
5th Regiment, Royal Horse Artillery (Field)
97th (Kent Yeomanry) Field Regiment, Royal Artillery
56th (Highland) Medium Regiment, Royal Artillery
54th (Argyll and Sutherland Highlanders) Light Anti-Aircraft Regiment, Royal Artillery

Commander Medium Artillery, III Corps

III Corps Medium Artillery HQ
139th (4th London) Army Field Regiment, Royal Artillery
65th (8th London) Field Regiment, Royal Artillery
69th (West Riding) Field Regiment, Royal Artillery
52nd (Bedfordshire Yeomanry) Heavy Regiment, Royal Artillery

==== 42nd (East Lancashire) Infantry Division ====
Major-General William Holmes

Division-level units

42nd (East Lancashire) Infantry Division Headquarters and Employment Platoon
42nd (East Lancashire) Infantry Divisional Field Cash Office, Royal Army Pay Corps
42nd (East Lancashire) Divisional Signals, Royal Signals
7th Battalion, The Cheshire Regiment
42nd (East Lancashire) Infantry Divisional Field Post Office, Royal Engineers
10th Mobile Bath Unit, Royal Army Ordnance Corps
42nd (East Lancashire) Infantry Divisional Provost Company, Corps of Military Police

125th Infantry Brigade

125th Infantry Brigade Headquarters and Signals Section, Royal Signals
5th Battalion, The Lancashire Fusiliers
6th Battalion, The Lancashire Fusiliers
1st Battalion, The Border Regiment
125th Infantry Brigade Anti-Tank Company

126th Infantry Brigade

126th Infantry Brigade Headquarters and Signals Section, Royal Signals
5th Battalion, The King's Own Royal Lancaster Regiment
1st Battalion, The East Lancashire Regiment
5th (Cumberland) Battalion, The Border Regiment
126th Infantry Brigade Anti-Tank Company

127th Infantry Brigade

127th Infantry Brigade Headquarters and Signals Section, Royal Signals
4th Battalion, The East Lancashire Regiment
5th Battalion, The Manchester Regiment
1st Battalion The Highland Light Infantry
127th Infantry Brigade Anti-Tank Company

Commander Royal Artillery, 42nd Division

42nd (East Lancashire) Infantry Divisional Royal Artillery HQ
52nd (Manchester) Field Regiment, Royal Artillery
53rd (Bolton) Field Regiment, Royal Artillery
56th (King's Own) Anti-Tank Regiment, Royal Artillery

Commander Royal Engineers, 42nd Division

42nd (East Lancashire) Divisional Engineers HQ
200th (East Lancashire) Field Company, Royal Engineers
201st (East Lancashire) Field Company, Royal Engineers
250th (East Anglian) Field Company, Royal Engineers
203rd (East Lancashire) Field Park Company, Royal Engineers

Commander Royal Army Service Corps, 42nd Division

42nd (East Lancashire) Infantry Divisional Royal Army Service Corps HQ
42nd (East Lancashire) Infantry Divisional Ammunition Company, Royal Army Service Corps
42nd (East Lancashire) Infantry Divisional Petrol Company, Royal Army Service Corps
42nd (East Lancashire) Infantry Divisional Supply Column, Royal Army Service Corps

Commander Royal Army Medical Corps, 42nd Division

42nd (East Lancashire) Infantry Divisional Royal Army Medical Corps HQ
125th (East Lancashire) Field Ambulance, Royal Army Medical Corps
126th (East Lancashire) Field Ambulance, Royal Army Medical Corps
127th (East Lancashire) Field Ambulance, Royal Army Medical Corps
20th Field Hygiene Section, Royal Army Medical Corps

==== 44th (Home Counties) Infantry Division ====
Major-General Edmund Osborne

Division-level units

44th (Home Counties) Infantry Division Headquarters and Employment Platoon
44th (Home Counties) Infantry Divisional Field Cash Office, Royal Army Pay Corps
44th (Home Counties) Infantry Divisional Signals, Royal Corps of Signals
8th Battalion, The Duke of Cambridge's Own Middlesex Regiment
44th (Home Counties) Infantry Divisional Field Post Office, Royal Engineers
11th Mobile Bath Unit, Royal Army Ordnance Corps
44th (Home Counties) Infantry Divisional Provost Company, Corps of Military Police

131st Infantry Brigade

131st Infantry Brigade Headquarters and Signals Section, Royal Signals
2nd Battalion, The Royal East Kent Regiment (Buffs)
5th Battalion, The Queen's Royal West Surrey Regiment
6th (Bermondsey) Battalion, The Queen's Royal West Surrey Regiment
131st Infantry Brigade Anti-Tank Company

132nd Infantry Brigade

132nd Infantry Brigade Headquarters and Signals Section, Royal Signals
1st Battalion, The Queen's Own Royal West Kent Regiment
4th Battalion, The Queen's Own Royal West Kent Regiment
5th Battalion, The Queen's Own Royal West Kent Regiment
132nd Infantry Brigade Anti-Tank Company

133rd Infantry Brigade

133rd Infantry Brigade Headquarters and Signals Section, Royal Signals
2nd Battalion, Royal Sussex Regiment
4th Battalion, Royal Sussex Regiment
5th (Cinque Ports) Battalion, Royal Sussex Regiment
133rd Infantry Brigade Anti-Tank Company

Commander Royal Artillery, 44th Division

44th (Home Counties) Infantry Divisional Royal Artillery HQ
57th (Home Counties) Field Regiment, Royal Artillery
58th (Sussex) Field Regiment, Royal Artillery
65th (8th London) Field Regiment, Royal Artillery
57th (East Surrey) Anti-Tank Regiment, Royal Artillery

Commander Royal Engineers, 44th Division

44th (Home Counties) Divisional Engineers HQ
11th Field Company, Royal Engineers
209th (Sussex) Field Company, Royal Engineers
210th (Sussex) Field Company, Royal Engineers
211th (Sussex) Field Park Company, Royal Engineers

Commander Royal Army Service Corps, 44th Division

44th (Home Counties) Infantry Divisional Royal Army Service Corps HQ
44th (Home Counties) Infantry Divisional Ammunition Company, Royal Army Service Corps
44th (Home Counties) Infantry Divisional Petrol Company, Royal Army Service Corps
44th (Home Counties) Infantry Divisional Supply Column, Royal Army Service Corps

Commander Royal Army Medical Corps, 44th Division

44th (Home Counties) Infantry Divisional Royal Army Medical Corps HQ
131st (Home Counties) Field Ambulance, Royal Army Medical Corps
132nd (Home Counties) Field Ambulance, Royal Army Medical Corps
133rd (Home Counties) Field Ambulance, Royal Army Medical Corps
14th Field Hygiene Section, Royal Army Medical Corps

=== Saar Force ===
Major-General Victor Fortune

On 10 May 1940, this force, which was really just the 51st Division reinforced by various small units, was part of the Colonial Army Corps of the French Third Army in front of the Maginot Line.

Units attached to the 51st (Highland) Infantry Division in April 1940 to form Saar Force

Lothians and Border Horse
7th Battalion The Northumberland Fusiliers (Machine-Guns)
1st Battalion Princess Louise's Kensington Regiment (Machine-Guns)
7th Battalion The Royal Norfolk Regiment (Pioneers)
6th Battalion The Royal Scots Fusiliers (Pioneers)
Sound Ranging and Survey Troop - detached from 3rd Survey Regiment RA
1st Regiment Royal Horse Artillery (Field)
51st (Midland) Medium Regiment Royal Artillery
385/97 Army Field Battery Royal Artillery
213th (North Midland) Army Field Company Royal Engineers
Topographic Section from 19th Army Field Survey Company Royal Engineers
22 Animal Transport Company Royal Indian Army Service Corps
Sub-Division from III Corps Ammunition Park Royal Army Service Corps
F Section from III Corps Petrol Park Royal Army Service Corps
10th Army Field Workshop Royal Army Ordnance Corps
10 Salvage Unit Auxiliary Military Pioneer Corps

==== 51st (Highland) Infantry Division ====
Major-General V. M. Fortune

Division-level units

51st (Highland) Infantry Divisional Signals Royal Signals
51st Divisional Postal Unit Royal Engineers
51st Divisional Provost Company Royal Military Police
8th Mobile Bath Unit Royal Army Service Corps
51st Divisional Supply Column Royal Army Service Corps

152nd Infantry Brigade

2nd Battalion, Seaforth Highlanders
4th Battalion, Seaforth Highlanders
4th Battalion, Queen's Own Cameron Highlanders
152nd Infantry Brigade Anti-Tank Company

153rd Infantry Brigade

4th Battalion, Black Watch (Royal Highland Regiment)
1st Battalion, Gordon Highlanders
5th Battalion, Gordon Highlanders
153rd Infantry Brigade Anti-Tank Company

154th Infantry Brigade

1st Battalion, Black Watch (Royal Highland Regiment)
7th Battalion, Argyll and Sutherland Highlanders
8th Battalion, Argyll and Sutherland Highlanders
154th Infantry Brigade Anti-Tank Company

Commander Royal Artillery

17th Field Regiment, Royal Artillery
23rd Field Regiment, Royal Artillery
75th (Highland) Field Regiment, Royal Artillery
10th Army Field Workshop WO 167/1210
51st (West Highland) Anti-Tank Regiment, Royal Artillery

Commander Royal Engineers

26th Field Company, Royal Engineers
236th (City of Aberdeen, Highland) Field Company, Royal Engineers
237th (City of Dundee, Highland) Field Company, Royal Engineers
239th (Highland) Field Park Company, Royal Engineers

=== Formations undergoing training and performing labour duties ===
==== 12th (Eastern) Infantry Division ====
Major-General R. L. Petre (Note: Although this division participated in the Battle of France, it was not adequately prepared for battle by May 1940. The division only had a skeleton headquarters staff, no organic artillery formations and few support units. Only a third of the infantry had received minimal training. The battalions lacked a carrier platoon and their full complement of heavy weapons.)

35th Infantry Brigade

2/5th Battalion, Queen's Royal Regiment (West Surrey)
2/6th Battalion, Queen's Royal Regiment (West Surrey)
2/7th Battalion, Queen's Royal Regiment (West Surrey)

36th Infantry Brigade

5th Battalion, Buffs (Royal East Kent Regiment)
6th Battalion, Queen's Own Royal West Kent Regiment
7th Battalion, Queen's Own Royal West Kent Regiment

37th Infantry Brigade

2/6th Battalion, East Surrey Regiment
6th Battalion, Royal Sussex Regiment
7th Battalion, Royal Sussex Regiment

Commander Royal Engineers

262nd Field Company, Royal Engineers
263rd Field Company, Royal Engineers
264th Field Company, Royal Engineers
265th Field Park Company, Royal Engineers

==== 23rd (Northumbrian) Division ====
Major-General W. N. Herbert

Divisional Troops

8th Battalion, Royal Northumberland Fusiliers (Motorcycle Battalion)
9th Battalion, Royal Northumberland Fusiliers (Machine Gun Battalion)

69th Infantry Brigade

5th Battalion, East Yorkshire Regiment
6th Battalion, Green Howards
7th Battalion, Green Howards

70th Infantry Brigade

10th Battalion, Durham Light Infantry
11th Battalion, Durham Light Infantry
1st Battalion, Tyneside Scottish

Commander Royal Engineers

233rd Field Company, Royal Engineers
507th Field Company, Royal Engineers
508th Field Park Company, Royal Engineers

==== 46th Infantry Division ====
Major-General H. O. Curtis

137th Infantry Brigade

2/5th Battalion, West Yorkshire Regiment
2/6th Battalion, Duke of Wellington's Regiment
2/7th Battalion, Duke of Wellington's Regiment

138th Infantry Brigade

6th Battalion, Lincolnshire Regiment
2/4th Battalion, King's Own Yorkshire Light Infantry
6th Battalion, York and Lancaster Regiment

139th Infantry Brigade

2/5th Battalion, Leicestershire Regiment
2/5th Battalion, Sherwood Foresters
9th Battalion, Sherwood Foresters

Commander Royal Engineers

270th Field Company, Royal Engineers
271st Field Company, Royal Engineers
272nd Field Company, Royal Engineers
273rd Field Park Company, Royal Engineers

=== HQ Lines of Communication British Expeditionary Force ===
Major-General Philip de Fonblanque

104th Army Troops Company, Royal Engineers
106th Army Troops Company, Royal Engineers
110th Army Troops Company, Royal Engineers
212th Army Troops Company, Royal Engineers
218th Army Troops Company, Royal Engineers

4th Battalion, Buffs (Royal East Kent Regiment)
14th Battalion, Royal Fusiliers
12th (Garrison) Battalion, Royal Warwickshire Regiment
4th Battalion, Border Regiment
1/5th Battalion, Sherwood Foresters

6 Group, Auxiliary Military Pioneer Corps
69 (Alien) Company, Auxiliary Military Pioneer Corps
401 [Palestinian] Company, Auxiliary Military Pioneer Corps

==== 3rd Anti-Aircraft Brigade ====
2nd Anti-Aircraft Regiment, Royal Artillery
8th (Belfast) Anti-Aircraft Regiment, Royal Artillery
79th (Hertfordshire Yeomanry) Anti-Aircraft Regiment, Royal Artillery
4th Light Anti-Aircraft Battery, Royal Artillery

=== Units arriving in France after 10 May 1940 ===
==== 1st Armoured Division ====
Major-General R. Evans (Note: The 1st Armoured Division arrived in France between 15–21 May. The division fought south of the Somme River and never linked up with the main body of the Expeditionary Force.)

2nd Armoured Brigade

2nd Dragoon Guards (Queen's Bays)
9th Queen's Royal Lancers
10th Royal Hussars (Prince of Wales's Own)

3rd Armoured Brigade

2nd (Battalion) Royal Tank Regiment
5th (Battalion) Royal Tank Regiment

30th Infantry Brigade (Note: Detached from 1st Armoured Division on 21 May 1940 and dispatched to defend Calais.)

3rd (Battalion) Royal Tank Regiment (Note: Detached from 3rd Armoured Brigade and attached to the 30th Infantry Brigade. The regiment was sent to defend Calais on 21 May 1940.)
2nd Battalion, King's Royal Rifle Corps
1st Battalion, Rifle Brigade (Prince Consort's Own)
1st Battalion, Queen Victoria's Rifles (7th Battalion, King's Royal Rifle Corps) (Motorcycle Battalion) (Note: The QVR was sent, without their vehicles, to defend Calais on 21 May 1940 and attached to the 30th Infantry Brigade.)

20th Guards Brigade Group (Note: The 20th (Guards) Infantry Brigade was dispatched from the United Kingdom to defend Boulogne on 21 May 1940.)

2nd Battalion, Irish Guards
2nd Battalion, Welsh Guards
20th Guards Brigade Anti-Tank Company

1st Support Group

101st Light Anti-Aircraft/Anti-Tank Regiment, Royal Artillery

== Air Component ==
Air Vice-Marshal Charles Blount (Data from Jackson 1974 unless indicated.)

85 Squadron: Hurricane (fighter)
87 Squadron: Hurricane (fighter)
607 Squadron: Gladiator (fighter, converting to Hurricane May 1940)
615 Squadron: Gladiator (fighter, converting to Hurricane May 1940)

3 Squadron: Hurricane (fighter; reinforcement, May 1940)
79 Squadron: Hurricane (fighter; reinforcement, May 1940)
504 Squadron: Hurricane (fighter; reinforcement, May 1940)

From 22 (Army Co-operation) Group
81 Squadron: Blenheim I (strategic reconnaissance)
57 Squadron: Blenheim I (strategic reconnaissance)
53 Squadron: Blenheim IV (bomber)
59 Squadron: Blenheim IV (bomber)
2 Squadron: Lysander (army co-operation)
4 Squadron: Lysander (army co-operation)
13 Squadron: Lysander (army co-operation)
16 Squadron: Lysander (army co-operation)
26 Squadron: Lysander (army co-operation)

== Second Expeditionary Force ==
The following force was sent to France during the second week of June 1940 in an unsuccessful attempt to form a second British Expeditionary Force. This second formation was to be commanded by Lieutenant-General A. F. Brooke. All units were evacuated in late June 1940, during Operation Aerial.

1st Canadian Infantry Brigade (from 1st Canadian Infantry Division)

Royal Canadian Regiment
Hastings and Prince Edward Regiment
48th Highlanders of Canada
1st Field Regiment Royal Canadian Horse Artillery

=== 52nd (Lowland) Infantry Division ===
Major-General J. S. Drew

155th Infantry Brigade

7th/9th (Highlanders) Battalion, Royal Scots
4th Battalion, King's Own Scottish Borderers
5th Battalion, King's Own Scottish Borderers

156th Infantry Brigade

4th/5th Battalion, Royal Scots Fusiliers
6th Battalion, Queen's Own Cameron Highlanders
7th Battalion, Queen's Own Cameron Highlanders

157th Infantry Brigade

1st Battalion, Glasgow Highlanders
5th Battalion, Highland Light Infantry
6th Battalion, Highland Light Infantry

Commander Royal Artillery

70th Field Regiment, Royal Artillery
71st Field Regiment, Royal Artillery
78th Field Regiment, Royal Artillery
54th (Queen's Own Royal Glasgow Yeomanry) Anti-Tank Regiment, Royal Artillery

Commander Royal Engineers

202nd Field Company, Royal Engineers
241st Field Company, Royal Engineers
554th Field Company, Royal Engineers
243rd Field Park Company, Royal Engineers

== See also ==
- Order of battle for the Battle of France
- List of British Empire divisions in the Second World War
