= Handa Island =

Island off the west coast of Sutherland, Scotland

Eilean Shannda (Gaelic)
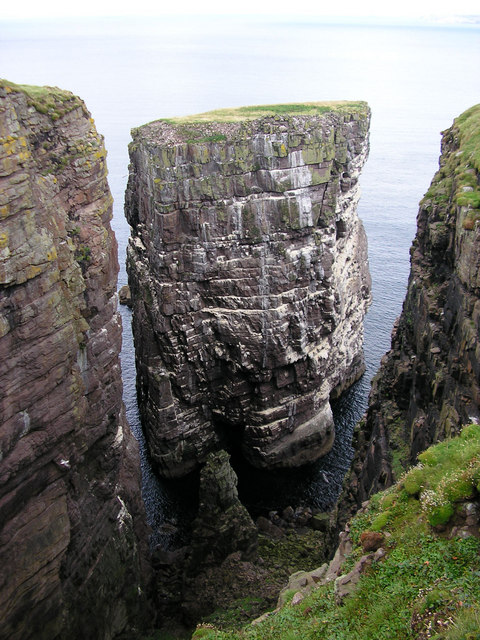
- The Great Stac of Handa

Location
- Handa Island shown within Sutherland
- OS grid reference: NC138480
- Coordinates: 58.380°N 05.186°W

Name
- Name meaning: sand isle
- Old Norse name: Sandey

Physical geography
- Island group: Inner Hebrides/Islands of Sutherland
- Area: 309 hectares (1 3/16 sq mi)
- Area rank: 87=
- Highest elevation: Sithean Mòr 123 m (404 ft)

Administration
- Country: Scotland
- Sovereign state: United Kingdom

Demographics
- Population: 0

Handa Island (Scottish Gaelic: Eilean Shannda) or usually Handa, is an island in Eddrachillis Bay off the west coast of Sutherland, Scotland. It is 309 hectares (760 acres) and 123 metres (404 ft) at its highest point.

The island is of national importance for its birdlife and maritime vegetation, and is a Scottish Wildlife Trust nature reserve, a Site of Special Scientific Interest (SSSI), and a Special Protection Area (SPA). Notable seabirds include guillemots, great skuas, puffins and razorbills. Handa also forms part of the North-West Sutherland national scenic area, one of 40 such areas in Scotland.

A small ferry sails to Handa from Tarbet on the mainland and boat trips operate to it from Fanagmore. The island receives five thousand visitors per annum.

== Etymology ==
The island's name is of mixed Gaelic and Norse origin. The Norse name was Sandey meaning "sand isle" from Old Norse: sandr. It was recorded in Joan Blaeu's 1654 Atlas of Scotland as "Ellan-Handey" with the addition of the Gaelic Eilean (meaning simply "island") and the Norse form having become Handey and ultimately "Handa" due to aspiration in Gaelic. MacBain and Haswell-Smith support the derivation of "sand isle", although Mac an Tàilleir translates the modern Gaelic of Eilean Shannda as "island at the sandy river". (Note: The nearest river is the Laxford the outflow of which into Loch Laxford is some 15 kilometres (9.3 mi) away.)

== Geography and geology ==
Handa is composed of Torridonian red sandstone and surrounded by cliffs covered with birds. In the north is a hill with two peaks, with the south and east being lower lying. The north and west have 100-metre-high (330 ft) cliffs, and there are beaches in the south and east. The Sound of Handa separates it from the mainland and smaller islands around Handa include Glas-Leac to the south, Eilean an Aigeach to the north east and Stac an t-Sealbhaig to the north.

The Great Stac of Handa was first climbed in 1876 by Donald McDonald, a native of St Kilda, who crossed the 24m gap between the stack and Handa "swinging hand-over hand from a rope". It was first climbed from the sea in August 1969 by Graeme Hunter, Hamish MacInnes and Douglas Lang. The height of the stack, which is one of the tallest in Scotland, is variously recorded as 72 metres (236 ft), "about 107m" and 115m. The nearby Stacan Geodh Bhrisidh is 40 metres (130 ft) high and was also first climbed by that trio in the same year.

== Flora and fauna ==
Handa is noted for its birdlife, which includes puffins, razorbills and guillemots. The SPA designation lists six priority species: fulmar, great skua, guillemot, kittiwake, and razorbill. The breeding colonies of razorbills and guillemots on Handa are the largest in the UK, representing 11% and 9% of the total British population respectively. The arctic skua and kittiwake populations are also of national importance, representing >1% and 2% of the British population respectively. Other birds at Handa include eider ducks and oystercatchers, and seals and otters can often be seen at Boulder Bay on the island's southern coast. Dolphins, basking sharks and several species of whale regularly visit the seas surrounding Handa.

Handa is also of national importance for its maritime vegetation. The exposed cliff tops are home to maritime grassland species that can tolerate salt, such as thrift, sea plantain and Festuca rubra. In less exposed areas can be found herb-rich grasslands which support species such as Yorkshire fog, bluebell and Scots lovage. Heather and crowberry are also widespread across the island.

== History ==
In the past the island was used as a burial place, and there are still the remains of a chapel in the south east, commemorated in the name Tràigh an Teampaill (Beach of the Temple). The use of Handa as burial place is thought to be due to the fact that wolves would dig up graves on the mainland so frequently that the inhabitants of Eddrachillis resorted to burying their dead on the island:

On Ederachillis’ shore
The grey wolf lies in wait,—
Woe to the broken door,
Woe to the loosened gate,
And the groping wretch whom sleety fogs
On the trackless moor belate.

Thus every grave we dug
The hungry wolf uptore,
And every morn the sod
Was strewn with bones and gore:
Our mother-earth had denied us rest
On Ederchaillis’ shore

— The Book of Highland Minstrelsy, 1846

It had a population of 65 in 1841 but following the 1847 Highland Potato Famine the inhabitants emigrated to Nova Scotia. In some ways this is surprising, since it is recorded that the islanders had a fairly varied diet including oats, fish and seabirds, rather than depending heavily on a potato crop. The islanders had a parliament, similar to that of St Kilda, which met daily, and the oldest widow on the island was considered its "Queen".

The island is now part of the Scourie Estate, owned by Dr Jean Balfour (until her 2023 death) and J.C. Balfour. The Balfours leased Handa to the RSPB for 25 years, however this lease was not renewed, because the Balfours wished a Scottish-based body to run the island; as a result the Scottish Wildlife Trust (SWT) took it over. Under the SWT the island is managed by one warden and a handful of volunteers during the summer months.

== Gallery ==
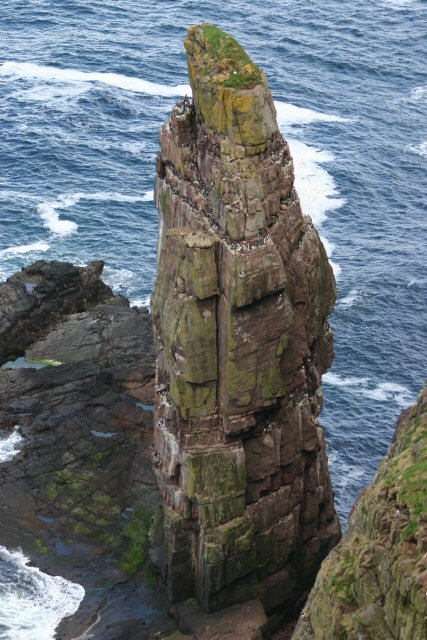
Stacan Geodh Bhrisidh

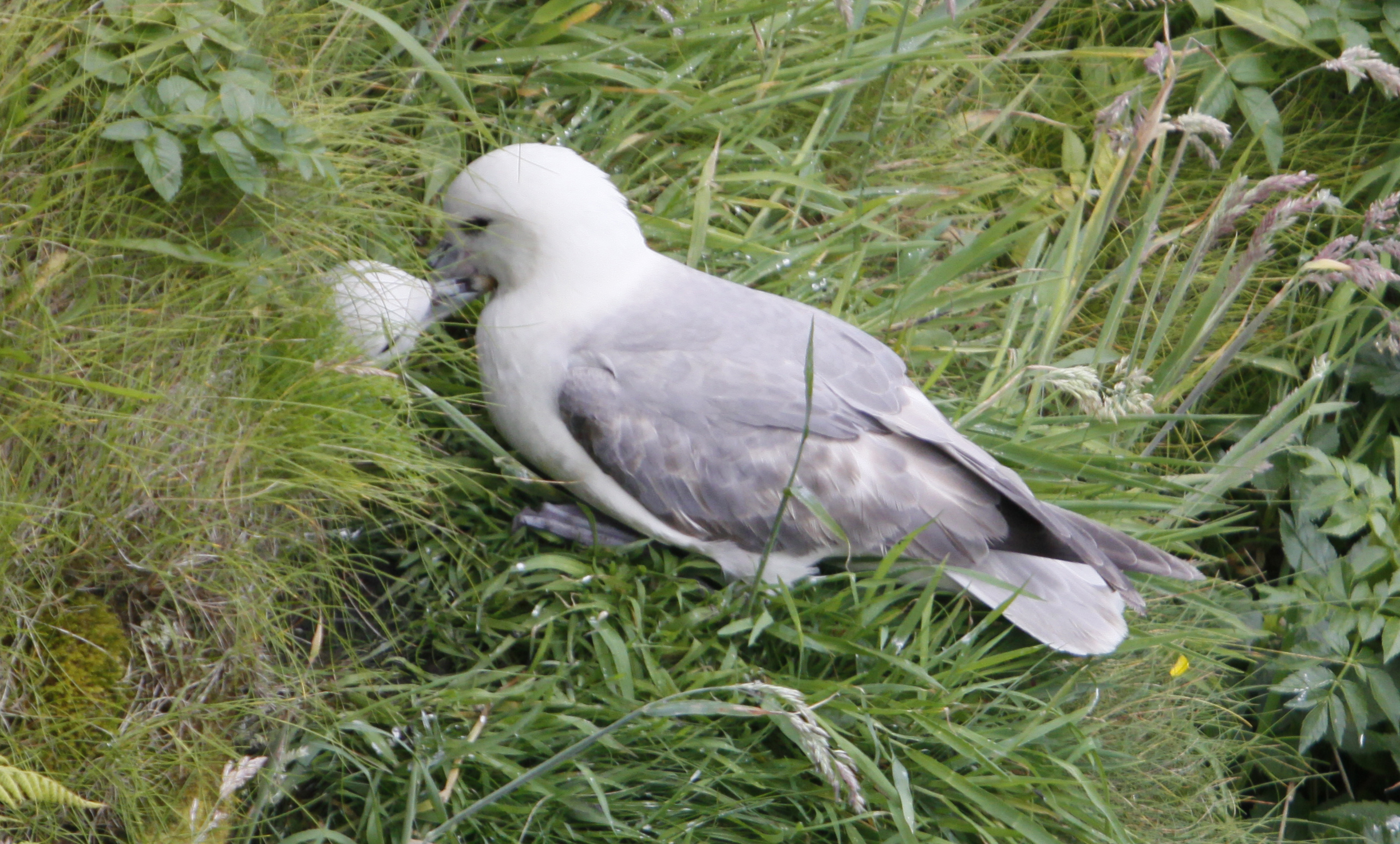
Northern fulmar (Fulmarus glacialis) at Handa Island

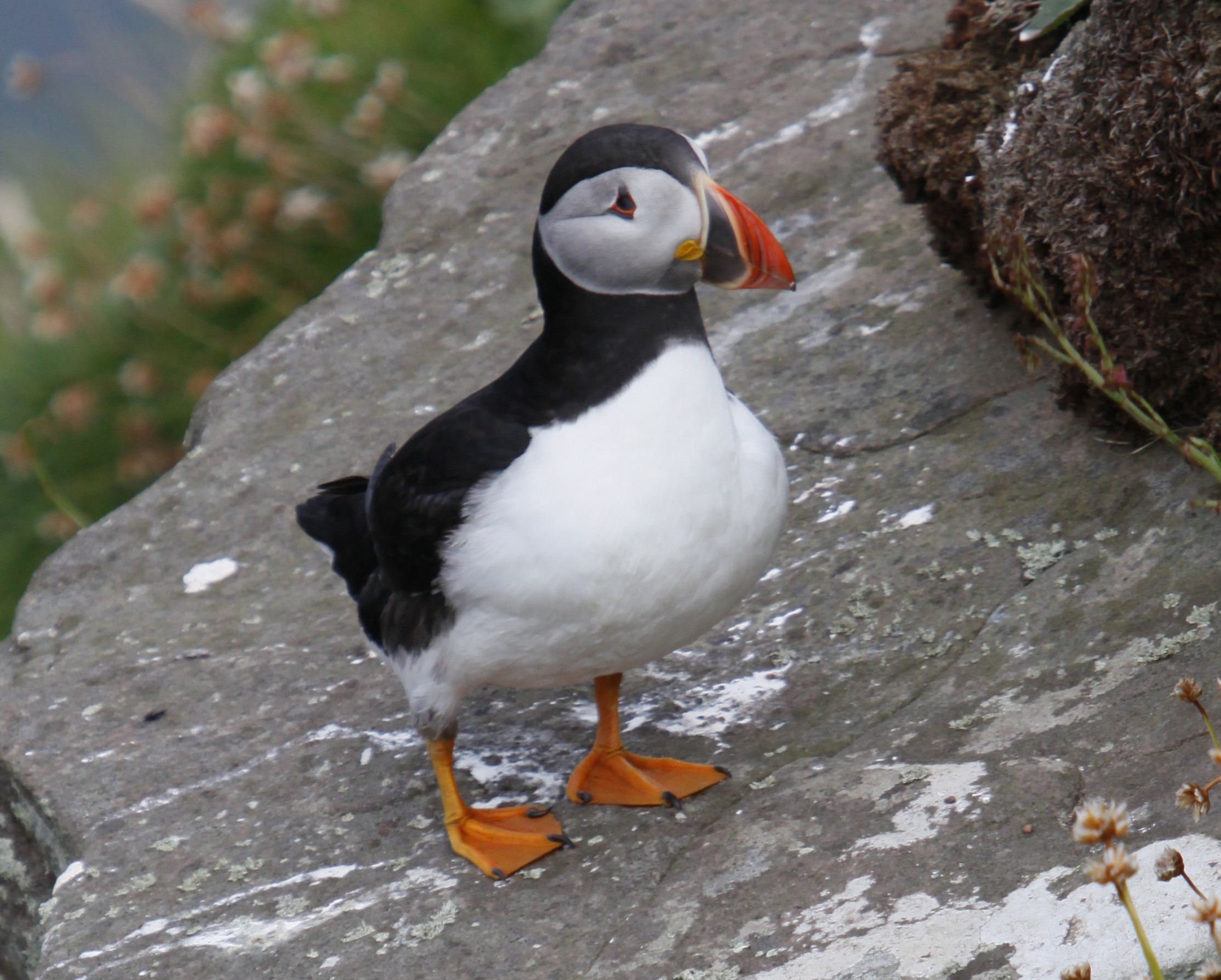
Puffin (Fratercula arctica) at Handa Island

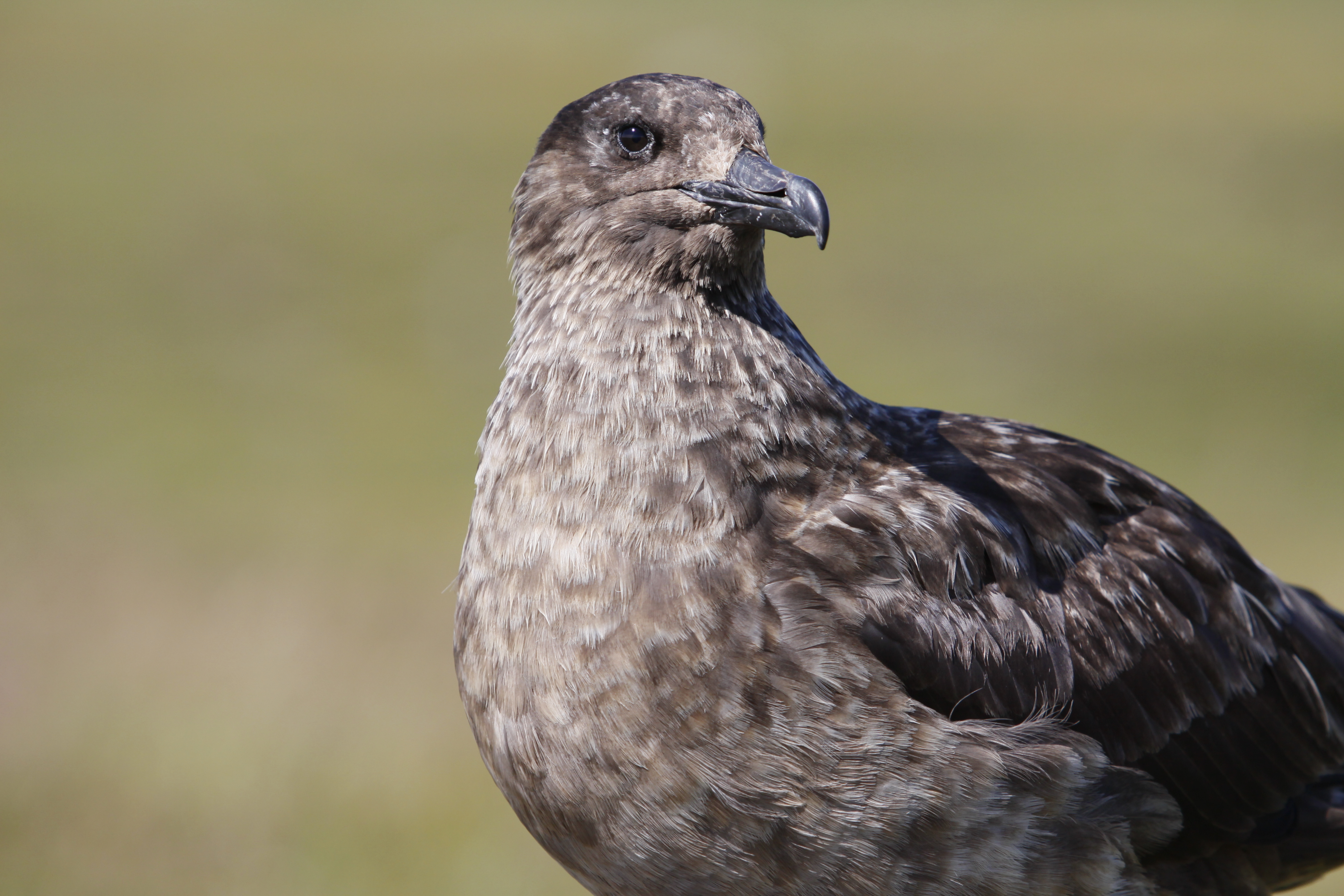
Great skua (Stercorarius skua) at Handa Island

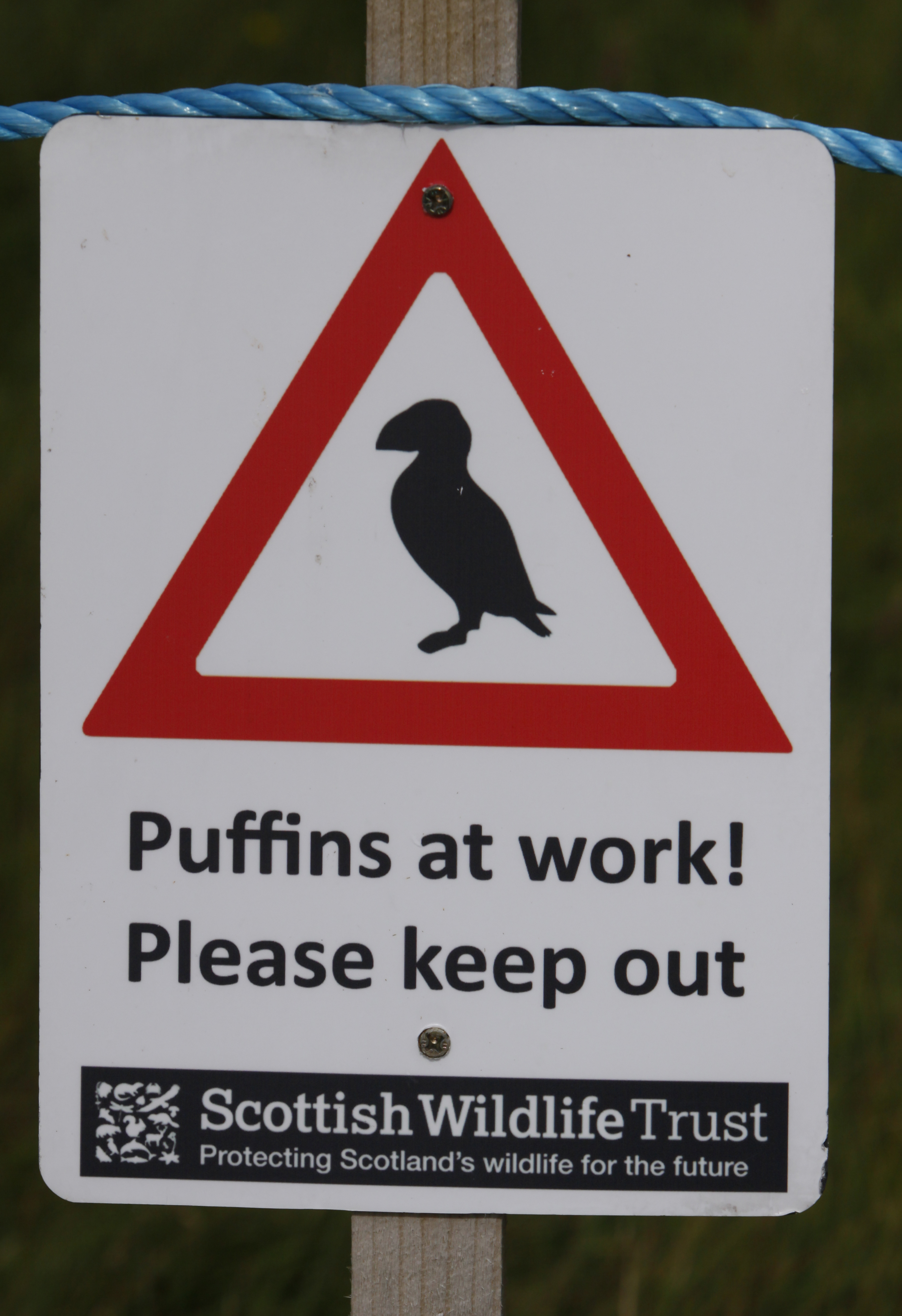
Sign for the breeding birds' protected area

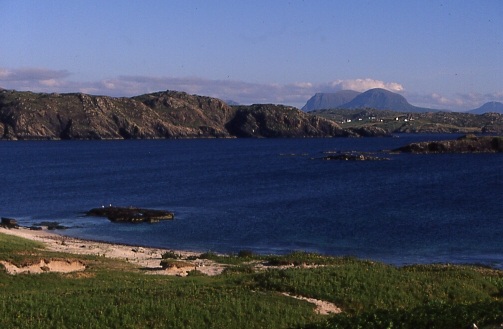
Quinag and Scourie across the Sound of Handa
