= Andrew McCulloch (British Army officer) =

British Army general (1876–1960)

Major-General Sir Andrew McCulloch KBE CB DSO** DCM DL
- Born: 14 July 1876; Edinburgh, Midlothian, Scotland
- Died: 19 April 1960 (aged 83); Castle Douglas, Scotland
- Military career
- Allegiance: United Kingdom
- Branch: British Army
- Service years: 1898–1938
- Rank: Major-General
- Service number: 6568
- Units: City of London Imperial Volunteers; Highland Light Infantry
- Commands: 9th (Service) Battalion, King's Own Yorkshire Light Infantry; 64th Infantry Brigade; 62nd Infantry Brigade; 2nd Infantry Brigade; Senior Officers' School; 52nd (Lowland) Infantry Division
- Conflicts: Second Boer War; First World War
- Awards: Knight Commander of the Order of the British Empire; Companion of the Order of the Bath; Distinguished Service Order; Distinguished Conduct Medal

Major-General Sir Andrew Jameson McCulloch, KBE, CB, DSO**, DCM, DL (14 July 1876 – 19 April 1960) was a senior British Army officer.

== Military career ==
Born the son of Lord Ardwall and Christian Brown, as "Andrew Jameson", he was educated at Edinburgh Academy, the University of St Andrews and New College, Oxford. He adopted the surname McCulloch for inheritance purposes in 1892. After studying at the Inner Temple and qualifying as an advocate, he was admitted to the Scottish bar in September 1897. He enlisted as a private soldier in the City of London Imperial Volunteers and then transferred to the Highland Light Infantry in August 1900.

He saw action in the Second Boer War and later in the First World War. He was placed in command of an infantry battalion of the Territorial Force (TF) and was granted the temporary rank of major whilst so employed. He then commanded the 9th (Service) Battalion, King's Own Yorkshire Light Infantry, from October 1917 and then the 64th Infantry Brigade from July 1917 during the First World War. He was awarded the Distinguished Service Order with two bars for his service during the war. The citation for his second bar reads:

For conspicuous gallantry and ability to command. On a pitch dark night he penetrated 4,500 yards into the enemy's lines, occupied his objective, and captured between 300 and 400 prisoners and two guns, as well as a village. The advance was over the worst country, and the right flank of the brigade was entirely uncovered throughout. Success was entirely due to his magnificent leadership, moving at the head of this brigade.

After the war he became commander of the 62nd Infantry Brigade in 1919, commander of the 2nd Infantry Brigade at Aldershot in 1926, and commandant of the Senior Officers' School at Sheerness on 7 March 1930. He was promoted to major general on 9 June 1933 and placed on half-pay after vacating this appointment on 9 September.

He went on to be General Officer Commanding 52nd (Lowland) Infantry Division in 1934, temporary commander of the Troops in Malta in 1935 and then on 15 March 1936 was appointed as colonel of the Highland Light Infantry. He was GOC 52nd (Lowland) Division again from 15 August 1936 until he retired from the army in 1938.

== Family ==
In 1905 he married Esmé Valentine Mackenzie; they had three sons.

Military offices
Preceded by Bertie Fisher	Commandant of the Senior Officers' School, Sheerness; 1930−1933	Succeeded by Wilfrid Lindsell
Preceded by Sir Walter Constable-Maxwell-Scott	GOC 52nd (Lowland) Infantry Division; 1934–1935	Succeeded by Victor Fortune
Preceded by Victor Fortune	GOC 52nd (Lowland) Infantry Division; 1936–1938	Succeeded by James Drew
Honorary titles
Preceded by Alfred Granville Balfour	Colonel of the Highland Light Infantry; 1936–1946	Succeeded by Alexander Telfer-Smollett
