= James Syme Drew =

British Army general (1883–1955)

Major-General Sir James Syme Drew KBE CB DSO MC DL
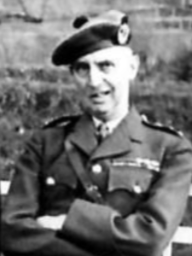
- Born: 1 September 1883; Manchester, England
- Died: 27 June 1955 (aged 71); Balavoulin, Pitlochry, Perthshire, Scotland
- Spouse(s): Victoria Maxwell, daughter of William Herries Maxwell
- Children: 4, including Jean Balfour
- Military career
- Allegiance: United Kingdom
- Branch: British Army
- Service years: 1902–1945
- Rank: Major-General
- Service number: 21772
- Unit: Queen's Own Cameron Highlanders
- Commands: Territorial Army; Home Guard; 52nd (Lowland) Infantry Division
- Conflicts: First World War; Second World War
- Awards: Knight Commander of the Order of the British Empire; Companion of the Order of the Bath; Distinguished Service Order; Military Cross; Mentioned in Despatches (6)

Major-General Sir James Syme Drew, KBE, CB, DSO, MC, DL (1 September 1883 – 27 June 1955) was a decorated British Army officer who saw service during both the world wars. He served as aide-de-camp to the King, commanded the 52nd (Lowland) Infantry Division, was colonel to the Queen's Own Cameron Highlanders, and became director-general of the Home Guard and Territorial Army.

== Early life ==
James Syme Drew was born on 1 September 1883 in Manchester, England, the youngest son of Thomas Auchterlonie Drew of Fallowfield, a master calico printer, and Elizabeth Beatrice Jane (née Syme), daughter of James Syme Esquire – manager of the British Linen Banking Company, Scotland. Although the Drew family was of Scottish ancestry (at least 6 generations on both sides) in the early 1870s Drew's grandfather, Alexander of Dalmonach and Blairmore relocated his printing business to Lowerhouse Printworks in Burnley, establishing offices in Glasgow and Manchester.

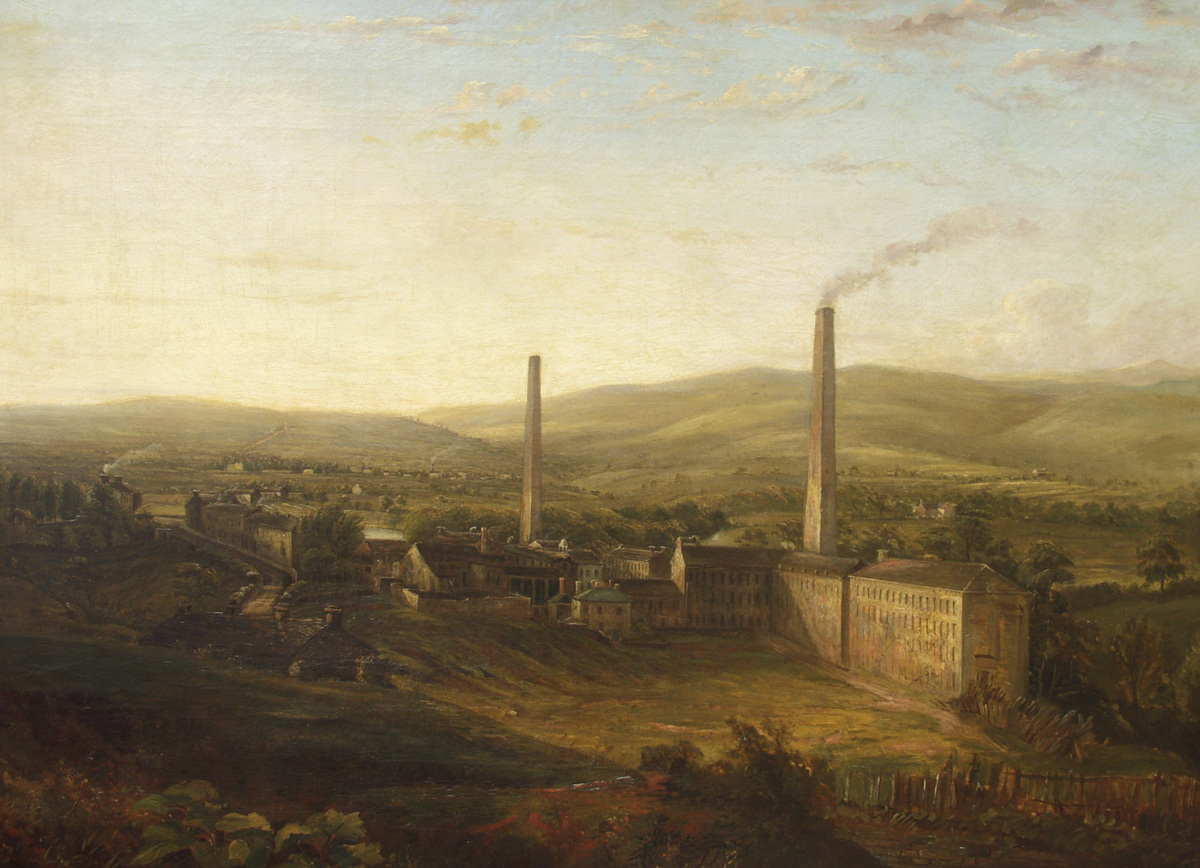
Lowerhouse Printworks, Burnley. c1830

Drew's father Tom, who was a director of the family printing business in Burnley, settled in the suburbs of Manchester, at Oak House, Fallowfield.

Drew entered Harrow School in 1897, joining his elder brother, Alexander Southerland (1879–1970), at Mortons; House Master, Charles Colbeck of Lemmington (1847–1903). Whilst at Harrow, Drew engaged with a variety of sporting activities including swimming, football, hurdles, and high-jump.

In October 1899, Drew was promoted to lance-corporal in the school's Rifle Company. Drew's time at Harrow was cut short when he responded to his country's call for soldiers in late 1900.

== Early military career ==
In January 1901, at the age of 17 years and 4 months, Drew was admitted to Sandhurst Royal Military College as an infantry officer cadet. In December of the same year, Drew passed his final examinations, with honours and exemplary conduct.

On 17 January 1902, Drew was appointed to a commission as 2nd lieutenant with the Queen's Own Cameron Highlanders.

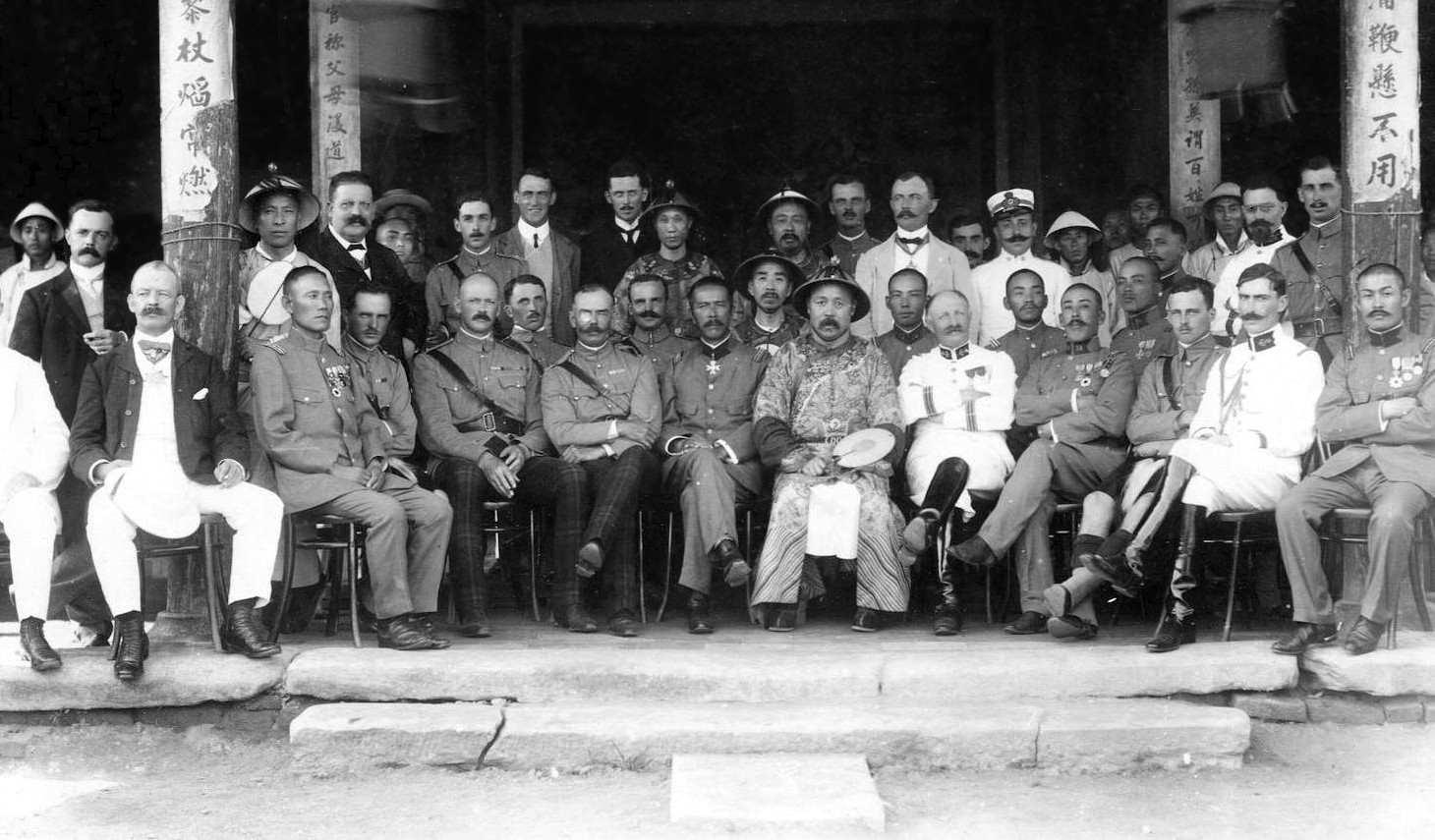
2nd Battalion, The Queen's Own Cameron Highlanders. Tientsin, China, 1908–1909

In 1902, Drew joined the 2nd Cameron Highlanders in Gibraltar, and was subsequently stationed in Crete in 1903, and Malta in 1904.

Drew was promoted to full lieutenant on 26 April 1905, as the 2nd Battalion relocated to Pretoria, South Africa, serving under Colonel H H L Malcolm. Drew was stationed with Malcolm in Pietermaritzburg, Natal, during the Zulu Rebellion of 1906. In 1907, Drew remained in South Africa, stationed at Robert Heights, Pretoria, now serving under Lieutenant-Colonel M S Riach.

In 1908 the Battalion left Robert Heights and headed for China, on board the R.I.M.S. Hardinge. Drew was stationed with the 2nd Cameron Highlanders at Tientsin, China.

In 1910 the Battalion relocated to Bangalore, India where it remained until 1914, when it moved to Poona, shortly before returning to England as war broke out across Europe in August 1914.

== First World War ==
Drew was on leave when the British armies were being mobilised but was soon selected by Colonel D W Cameron of Lochiel to serve as the Adjutant to his newly formed 5th (Service) Battalion, the Queens Own Cameron Highlanders, and was duly promoted to the rank of captain in September 1914.

The 5th (Service) Battalion, Cameron Highlanders, was formed in August 1914, at Inverness, as part of the First New Army and then moved to Aldershot as part of the 26th (Highland) Infantry Brigade of the 9th (Scottish) Division. In February 1915, the Battalion moved to Guadaloupe Barracks, Bordon and on 10 May 1915 was mobilised for war and landed at Boulogne.

The 5th Cameron Highlanders engaged in a large number of actions on the Western front, from 1915 to 1918.

=== Western Front ===
The 5th Cameron Highlanders spent their first two months of the war in reserve but by the end of June were in the trenches in the vicinity of Festubert. Drew found the state of the trenches to be bad, "being both unsafe and insanitary".

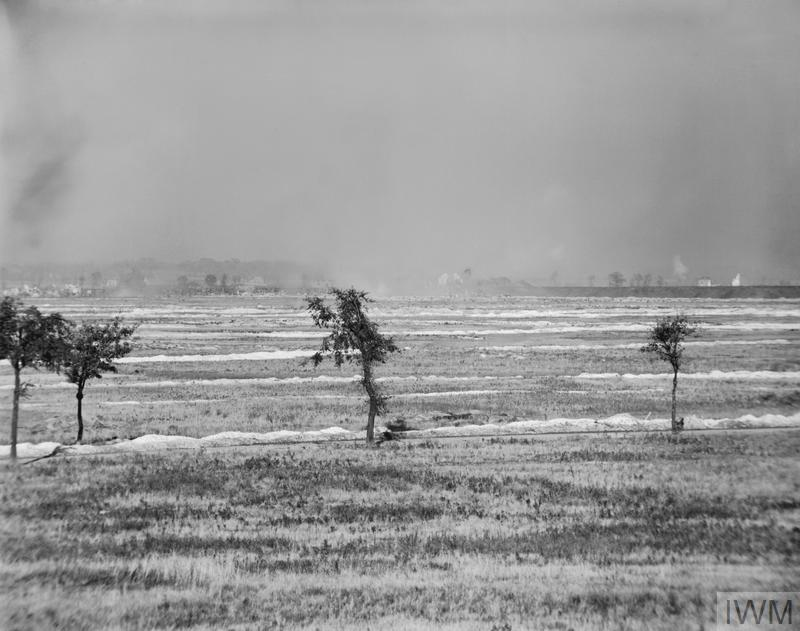
Battle of Loos; British attack on the Hohenzollern Redoubt; a cloud of smoke and gas in the centre and on the left.

Drew fought with the 5th Cameron Highlanders in the Battle of Loos, notable for being the first battle in which the British used poison gas and the first mass engagement of New Army units. The following excerpt from the Battalion War Diary details the events of the first hour of the attack on Fosse No 8, starting from Vermelles on 25 September 1916:

6.40 am: The Battalion advanced in three lines as follows: A & B in two lines of half companies, third line C company, fourth line D company in Battalion Reserve, with HQ lines and Machine Gunners in the rear.

7.10 am: First two lines reported to have passed first German trench, i.e. Little Willie. D company were then sent forward to occupy German main line trench, Fosse Trench.

7.30 am: Battalion HQ advanced. It was found that the whole line of advance was enfiladed by heavy machine gun and rifle fire from Mad Point and Madagascar. This fire had caused very heavy losses, practically having wiped out the first two lines. With HQ, the remains of D Company and the other lines pushed forward and reached the southwest corner of the Corons.

7.40 am: From here the advance through the cottages was unopposed and the forward end of the Corons was reached without further loss. Immediately after, some 250 of the 8th Black Watch arrived in our support.

By 9 am the only officers of the 5th Cameron Highlanders remaining were the commanding officer, Lochiel, and the Adjutant, Drew; together with about 80 NCOs and men, they combined with the 8th Black Watch and formed a mixed force of about 300 odd men who held part of the forward end of the Corons, in a trench and part of the left flank, with the 7th Seaforths on the right. During the day the enemy shelling in the Fosse became more intense but there was no sign of a counter attack. At 8 pm, orders were received that they would be relieved by a battalion of the Northamptons and by 1.30 am the following morning the 26th Brigade had indeed been relieved by the 73rd Brigade.

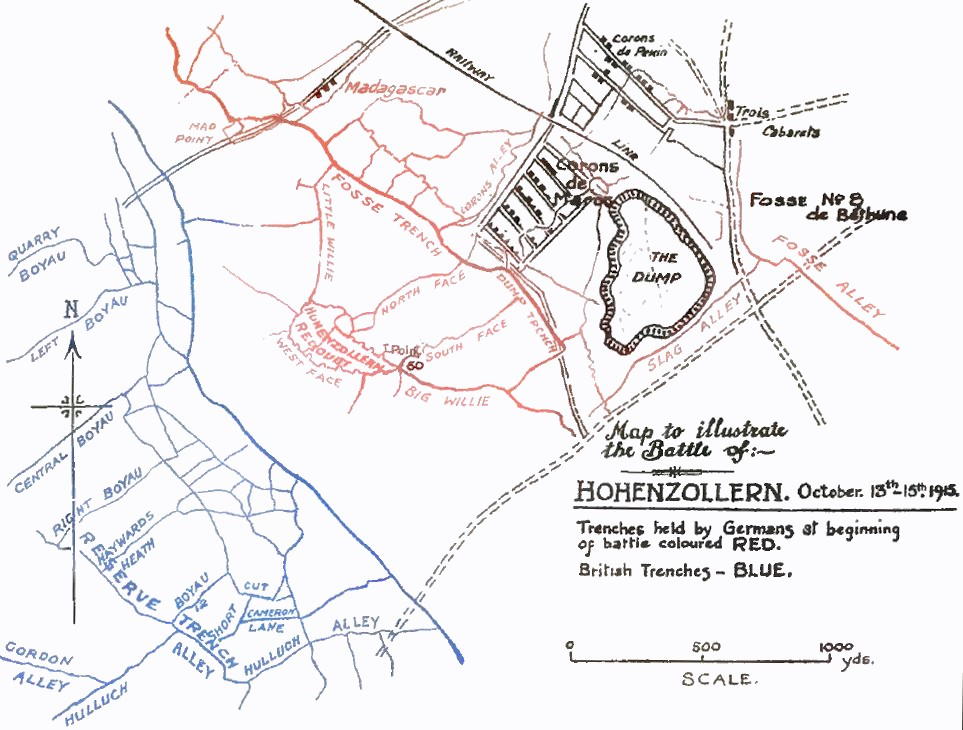
Trench map depicting the Hohenzollern Redoubt.

The next day, the 5th Cameron Highlanders were in their old positions in the front line trenches. Reserve soldiers, including machine gunners and 4 officers of the battalion, were called up, making the strength of the Battalion in the front line about 150 rank and file.

In the morning of 27 September, the 26th Brigade sent some 100 men up to the Hohenzollern Redoubt to strengthen the 73rd Brigade. At 3 pm, the 26th Brigade charged the redoubt on the right at Dump Trench and when the remnants of the 5th Cameron Highlanders reached the redoubt they were finally blocked by the number of their own troops in the redoubt. Drew's analysis of the effectiveness of the action was captured in the Battalion War Diary: "This charge undoubtedly had a great moral effect on our own troops in front – it also took the Germans by surprise, many of whom fled."

The Battle of Loos was a complete failure for the British. The cost of the operation in casualties for the 5th Cameron Highlanders was great: 18 officers (9 killed, 9 wounded); 644 other ranks (72 killed, 416 wounded, 156 missing). However, this was dwarfed by the total number of British casualties – almost 60,000 during the course of the main and subsidiary attacks.

In January 1916, Drew was mentioned in the Despatches of Field Marshal Sir John French, gained the Military Cross (MC) for his actions in the battle, and was appointed to be the brigade major of the 26th (Highland) Infantry Brigade.

In June, Drew was mentioned in the Despatches of Field Marshal Sir Douglas Haig and was awarded the rank of Brevet Major.

==== Somme offensive ====
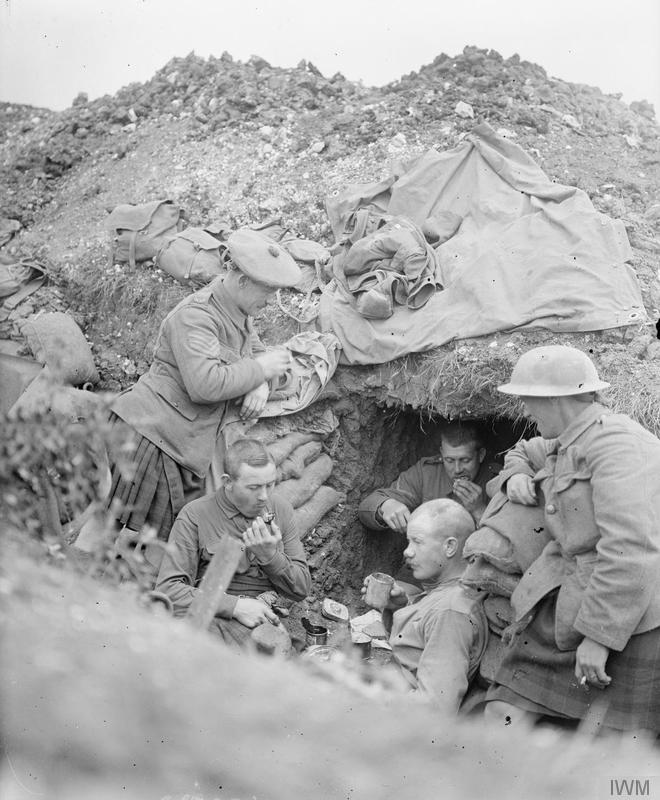
Cameron Highlanders having a dinner in a dugout in a trench at Contalmaison, September 1916. © IWM (Q 4133)

In July 1916, Drew's 26th Brigade took part in the Battles of Albert, Bazentin Ridge and Delville Wood. In the autumn of 1916 the 26th Brigade saw more action during the Battle of Le Transloy.

In January 1917, Drew was again mentioned in Haig's despatches and was promoted to the rank of major.

Drew left the 9th (Scottish) Division in February to take up a Staff appointment with the 15th (Scottish) Division, who would take part in the Battle of Arras and the Battle of Passchendaele.

In June, Drew was once again mentioned in Haig's Despatches.

In October, Drew took up a staff appointment with the XVIII Army Corps for the Second Battle of Passchendaele.

In December, Drew was again mentioned in Haig's Despatches, for distinguished and gallant services and devotion to duty during the February to September 1917 period, for which he gained the Distinguished Service Award.

In March 1918, Drew was given the rank of temporary lieutenant-colonel and took up a Special Appointment as Chief Instructor at the Senior Officers' School, Aldershot.

=== The final advance ===
On 3 November 1918, Drew was back in France, serving with the 63rd (Royal Naval) Division who had recently taken part in the final Battle of Cambrai.

On 5 November, the Royal Naval Division, as part of XXII Corps, First Army began a three-day advance into Belgium, known as the Passage of the Grande Honnelle, a final phase in the Hundred Days Offensive that virtually ended the First World War.

=== Occupation of the Rhineland ===
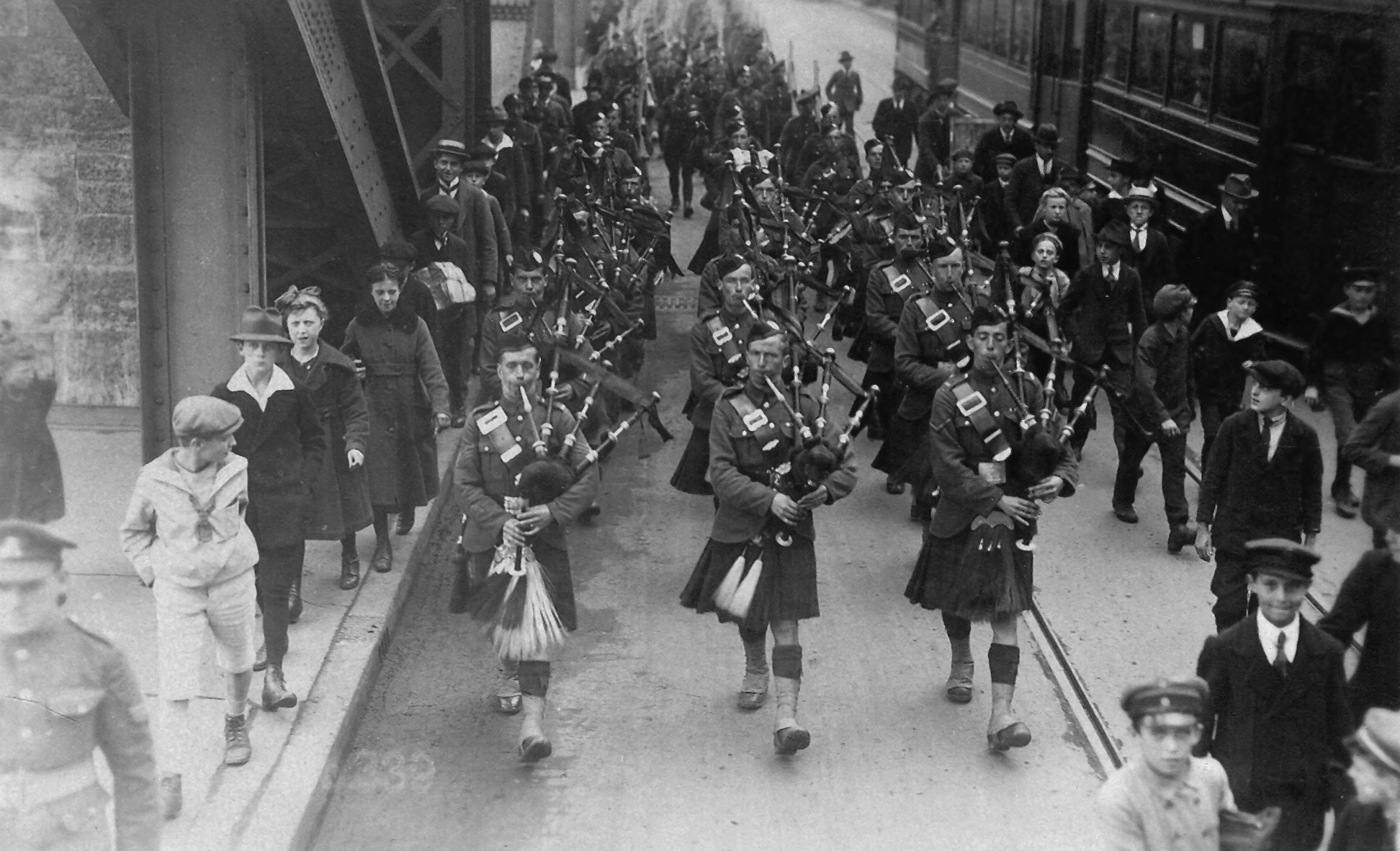
9th (Scottish) Division crossing the Hohenzollern bridge. Cologne, Germany, 12 December 1918

On 14 November 1918, following the Armistice, Drew was appointed to Chief of Staff with the Incomparable 29th Division, who were "to march into Germany to occupy the Rhine bridgehead".

In December, the 29th Division met up with Drew's old 9th (Scottish) Division in Cologne. On 27 February, with the imminent formation of the British Army of the Rhine (BAOR), Drew's Staff appointment with the 29th Division came to an end.

In July 1919, Drew was again mentioned in Haig's final Despatches of the First World War.

== Interwar period ==
Following the end of the war, Drew entered Staff College, Camberley to train for higher command.

Between January and November 1920, during the Irish War of Independence, Drew was temporarily posted to Irish Command.

In January 1923, Drew was appointed to a General Staff Office position at Staff College, Camberley.

In January 1927, Drew was promoted to colonel.

In November 1929, Drew was appointed to Assistant Commandant & Chief Instructor (Class Y) at Netheravon Wing, Small Arms School.

In March 1932, Drew became Assistant Director to the Director General of the Territorial Army, General Sir William Thwaites. Drew represented the Director General on the Territorial Army Nursing Services Committee and the War Office's Army Sport Control Board.

In February 1936, Drew was appointed to Brigadier General Staff, Southern Command, and was given the rank of temporary Brigadier. And in April he was appointed as an Aid-de-camp to the King.

In December 1937, Drew was promoted to major-general.

In March 1938, with the outbreak of war with Germany on the horizon, Drew was appointed as a Divisional Commander in Scottish Command and was given command of the 52nd (Lowland) Infantry Division.

== Second World War ==
In December 1938, Drew was awarded Companion of The Most Honourable Order of the Bath.

The 52nd (Lowland) Infantry Division was mobilised, along with the rest of the Territorial Army, in late August 1939. The Second World War began on 3 September 1939, after both Britain and France declared war on Germany following the latter's invasion of Poland. Based in Scotland, Drew was in command of the 52nd Division as war broke out across Europe.

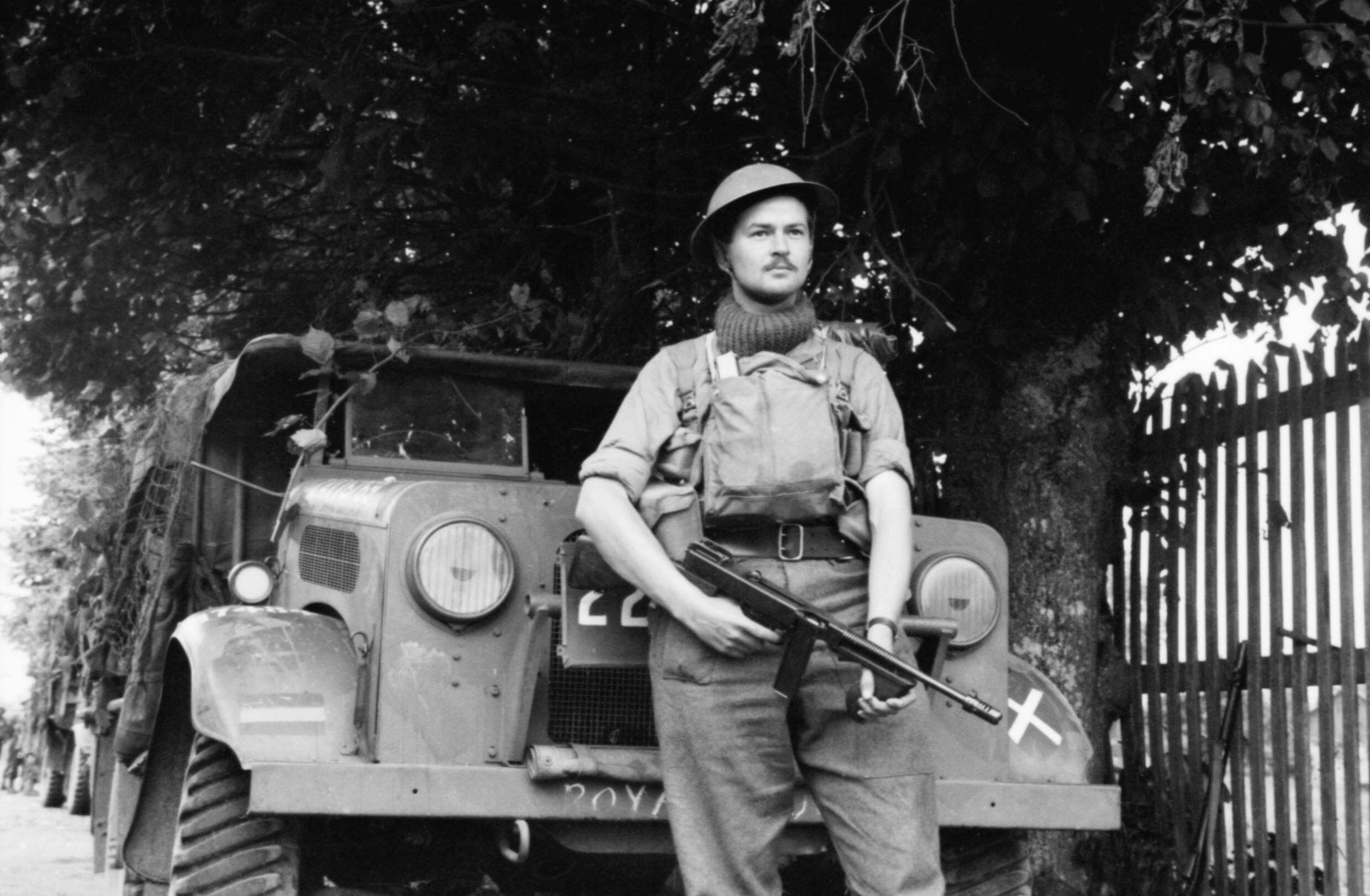
A soldier of the 52nd Lowland Division. France, 13 June 1940. IWM F 4833

The division was briefly deployed to France, following the Dunkirk evacuation, as part of the Second British Expeditionary Force (2BEF) to cover the withdrawal of Allied forces near Cherbourg during Operation Aerial. After the division returned to the United Kingdom it began training to repel an expected German invasion, which never happened.

Drew's time with the 52nd Division came to an end in March 1941 and Major-General Sir John Laurie took over command of the Division.

In November 1942, Drew was appointed major-general for Combined Operations.

Drew was appointed to be Colonel of the Queen's Own Cameron Highlanders in October 1943 and in February of the following year "His Majesty The King conferred upon Major-General James Syme Drew the honour of Knighthood".

In June 1944, Drew was made Director-General of the Home Guard and the Territorial Army.

== Postwar period ==
In 1946, Drew became chairman of the British Royal Legion Scotland.

In 1947, Drew was made Deputy Lieutenant of Perthshire.

Drew died 27 Jun 1955, at his home, Balavoulin, near Blair Atholl, Scotland.

== Honours, decorations, awards and distinctions ==
=== Mentioned in despatches ===
For his distinguished and gallant services and devotion to duty during the First World War, Drew was mentioned in despatches on a total of six occasions:

- John French: 1/1/16
- Douglas Haig: 15/6/16, 4/1/17, 15/5/17, 11/12/17 and 5/7/19.

=== Orders, decorations and medals ===
Complete name	Post-nominal letters	Ribbon	Awarded to/for	Awarded
Knight of The Most Excellent Order of the British Empire	KBE		Miscellaneous (military and civil). The Sovereign makes all appointments to the Order on the advice of the Government.	February 1944
Companion of The Most Honourable Order of the Bath	CB		Military division: senior military officers. The Sovereign makes all appointments to the Order on the advice of the Government.	December 1938
Companion of The Distinguished Service Order	DSO		Military officers for leadership while on active service. The Sovereign makes all appointments to the Order on the advice of the Government.	January 1918
Military Cross	MC		British, (formerly) Commonwealth, and allied forces on land for "... gallantry during active operations against the enemy."	January 1916
Deputy Lieutenant	D.L.		Deputy to the Lord Lieutenant of Perthshire	
Post Staff College	p.s.c.†		A graduate of Senior Wing at Staff College, Camberley	

== Bibliography ==
- Malcolm, Charles Alexander (1950). The History of the British Linen Bank. Edinburgh: T. and A. Constable.
- Queen's Own Cameron Highlanders (1909). Historical Records of the Queen's Own Cameron Highlanders. Vol. 2. Great Britain: W. Blackwood.
- Queen's Own Cameron Highlanders (1931). Historical Records of the Queen's Own Cameron Highlanders. Vol. 3. Great Britain: W. Blackwood.
- Queen's Own Cameron Highlanders (1952). Historical Records of the Queen's Own Cameron Highlanders. Vol. 5. Great Britain: W. Blackwood.
- Edmonds., J. E (1928). Military Operations France and Belgium, 1915: Battles of Aubers Ridge, Festubert, and Loos. History of the Great War Based on Official Documents By Direction of the Historical Section of the Committee of Imperial Defence. (1st ed.). Vol. II. London: Macmillan. OCLC 58962526.
- French, John Denton Pinkstone (1917). The despatches of Lord French. London: Chapman & Hall.
- Joslen, H. F. (1960). Orders of Battle: Second World War, 1939–1945.
- Hart's Annual Army List, London: John Murray (Firm)
- Monthly Army Lists, 1914–1918, London: HMSO
- War Diary. 5 Battalion Cameron Highlanders. May 1915 – Feb 1919., Kew: The National Archives, 1915, WO 95/1767/1

Military offices
Preceded by Andrew McCulloch	GOC 52nd (Lowland) Infantry Division; 1938–1941	Succeeded by Sir John Laurie
Honorary titles
Preceded by Neville Cameron	Colonel of the Queen's Own Cameron Highlanders; 1943–1951	Succeeded by Douglas Wimberley
