= Balavoulin =

Building in Scotland

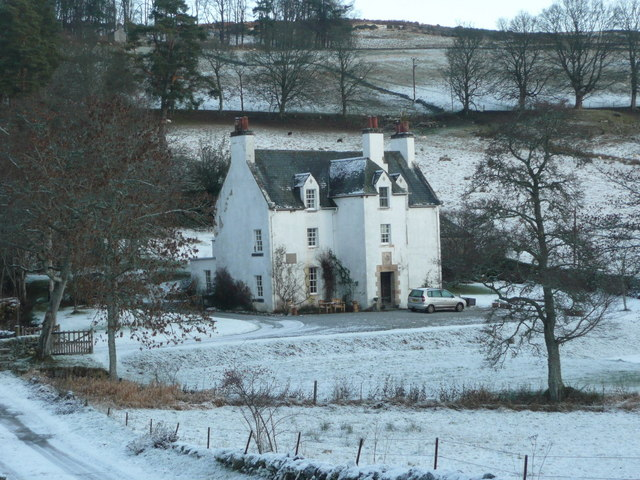
- The building in 2008, looking northeast
- Interactive map of the Balavoulin area

General information
- Location: Blair Atholl, Perth and Kinross, Scotland
- Coordinates: 56.7318°N 3.8435°W
- Completed: 1905 (121 years ago)

Technical details
- Floor count: 3 (including attic)

Design and construction
- Architect: Ramsay Traquair

Balavoulin, also known as Milton Lodge, is a Category B listed building in Blair Atholl, Perth and Kinross, Scotland.

The building is two storeys with an attic, and its architect was Ramsay Traquair.

James Syme Drew, a major-general in the British Army, was living at Balavoulin at the time of his death in 1955.

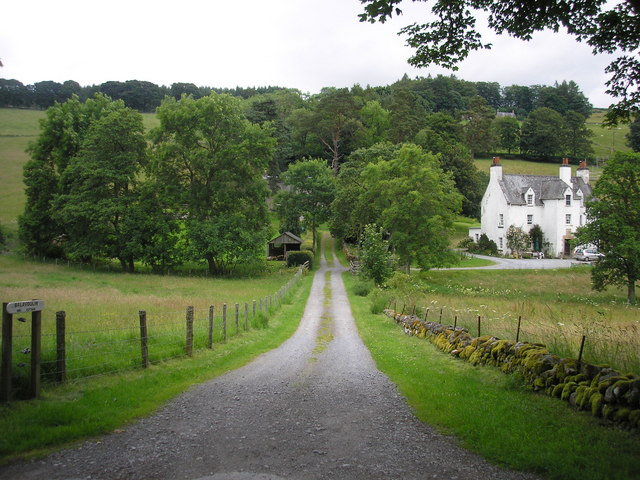
The access road to the property
