= Jean Balfour =

Scottish forester, landowner and conservationist (1927–2023)

Elizabeth Jean Balfour, CBE, FRSE, FRSA (née Drew, 4 November 1927 – 27 February 2023) was a Scottish professional forester, landowner and conservationist. Balfour is noted for her many contributions to forestry, conservation and land management. She held leadership roles with several organisations. In 1984. she wrote a report that listed recommendations for restructuring legislation regarding nature conservation and countryside management in Northern Ireland; many of which were taken into consideration and implemented by the government. She was the Chair of Countryside Commission for Scotland from 1972 to 1982. Balfour was also an accomplished artist, painting watercolours under her maiden name, Jean Drew.

== Art ==
Jean Balfour painted under her maiden name of Jean Drew through most of her life. Her primary medium was watercolour. Art was further expression to Balfour's long-term love and interest in the countryside and remote areas, especially in Scotland, Iceland and the Arctic, where she studied plants and the landscape. An important exhibition of her work, titled "Scotland's Countryside", was held at Rhueart Gallery, near Ullapool, Scotland from 1 September to 31 October 2018.

== Early life and education ==
Balfour was born on 4 November 1927 to Major General James Syme Drew and his wife Victoria. She earned her B.Sc.(Hons.) in Botanical Sciences from the University of Edinburgh in 1949. She married John Charles Balfour in 1950.

== Career and research ==
Balfour is noted for her many contributions to forestry, conservation and land management. She held leadership roles with several organisations, societies and public bodies, and was active in many key decisions related to sustainable farming and forestry over many decades throughout the second half of the 20th century.

She was a partner/owner of Balbirnie Home Farms and Balbirnie Dairy Farm. The Scourie estate was also owned by her. Balfour was interested in arctic-alpine vegetation and took part in many botanical expeditions including Greenland, Ellesmere Island, Spitzbergen, Franz Joseph Land, Novaya Zemlya, Severnaya Zemlya, and arctic Siberia to collect field data. Her data has been used in collaboration with other professors on papers involving population dynamics and the impact of changing climate conditions. In 1984 she wrote A New Look at the Northern Ireland Countryside (1984) which listed many recommendations for restructuring legislation regarding nature conservation and countryside management. Many of her suggestions were taken into consideration and implemented. She was the Chair of Countryside Commission for Scotland from 1972 to 1982. During the years 1983–1985 she worked at Chieftain Industries. From 1999 to 2008, she was the Chair at Loch Duart, an independent salmon farm and the largest local employer. She helped publish The Rising Tide regarding women in traditionally male-dominated fields.

== Art ==
Jean Balfour painted under her maiden name of Jean Drew through most of her life. Her primary medium was watercolour. Art was further expression to Balfour's long-term love and interest in the countryside and remote areas, especially in Scotland, Iceland and the Arctic, where she studied plants and the landscape. An important exhibition of her work, titled "Scotland's Countryside", was held at Rhueart Gallery, near Ullapool, Scotland from 1 September to 31 October 2018.

== Death ==
Balfour died on 27 February 2023, at the age of 95.

== Public appointments ==
- Governor, East of Scotland College of Agriculture (since 1990 part of Scotland's Rural College (SRUC))(served for >30 years)
- Member, Scottish Agriculture Development Council, 1972–1977
- Member, Nature Conservancy Council, 1973–1980
- President, Royal Scottish Forestry Society
- Chairman, Countryside Commission for Scotland
- Vice-Chairman, Scottish Wildlife Trust, 1968–1972
- West Sutherland Fisheries Trust, 1996–
- Chairman, Seafish Industry Authority
- Deputy Chair, Committee on Women in Science, Engineering, and Technology, 1993–1994

== Awards ==
- Commander of the Order of the British Empire (CBE) (1981)
- Order of the Falcon (1994) (Iceland)
- Institute of Chartered Foresters Medal (1996)
- Honorary Doctorates from University of St Andrews and University of Stirling
- Honorary Fellow: Institute of Chartered Foresters
- Fellow: Royal Society of Arts, Royal Society of Edinburgh, Royal Zoological Society of Scotland, Royal Society of Biology (Institute of Biology), Royal Scottish Geographical Society
