= 64th Brigade (United Kingdom) =

British Army formation

The 64th Brigade was a formation of the British Army. It was raised as part of the new army also known as Kitchener's Army and assigned to the 21st Division and served on the Western Front during the First World War.

The brigade formed up at Witley Camp in early September 1915, before embarking for France, arriving in Le Havre and Boulogne-sur-Mer on 12 September. After a brief billeting, the brigade was marched to the front and were engaged in the Battle of Loos from 26 September.

== Formation ==
The infantry battalions did not all serve at once, but all were assigned to the brigade during the war.

- 9th Battalion, King's Own Yorkshire Light Infantry
- 10th Battalion, King's Own Yorkshire Light Infantry
- 14th Battalion, Durham Light Infantry
- 15th Battalion, Durham Light Infantry
- 1st Battalion, East Yorkshire Regiment
- 2nd Battalion, South Lancashire Regiment
- 64th Machine Gun Company
- 64th Trench Mortar Battery
