= Countryside Commission for Scotland =

The Countryside Commission for Scotland was a statutory body in Scotland that was established by the Countryside (Scotland) Act 1967. Its role was to provide, develop and improve facilities for the enjoyment of the Scottish countryside, and to conserve and enhance the country's natural beauty. The body existed alongside the Countryside Commission, which covered England and Wales. The commission led to the establishment of Scotland's 40 National Scenic Areas, the Regional Parks, and the formation of a countryside ranger service. It also provided individual grants to support facilities such as car parks and visitor centres.

The Commission ceased to exist in 1992 when it was merged with Scottish division of the Nature Conservancy Council (NCC) to become Scottish Natural Heritage (SNH). SNH was renamed NatureScot in 2020.
