= Douglas Brownrigg =

British Army general (1886–1946)

Lieutenant-General Sir Douglas Brownrigg KCB DSO
- Brownrigg in 1938
- Born: 21 April 1886; Chelsea, London, England
- Died: 7 February 1946 (aged 59); South Kensington, London, England
- Military career
- Allegiance: United Kingdom
- Branch: British Army
- Service years: 1905–1940
- Rank: Lieutenant-General
- Service number: 23103
- Unit: Sherwood Foresters
- Commands: 51st (Highland) Division; 159th (Welsh Border) Infantry Brigade
- Conflicts: First World War; Second World War
- Awards: Knight Commander of the Order of the Bath; Distinguished Service Order; Mentioned in Despatches (6)

Lieutenant-General Sir Wellesley Douglas Studholme Brownrigg, KCB, DSO (21 April 1886 – 7 February 1946) was a senior British Army officer who served as Military Secretary from 1938 to 1939.

== Military career ==
Brownrigg was educated at Mulgrave Castle and later entered and then graduated from the Royal Military College, Sandhurst, and was commissioned into the 1st Battalion, the Sherwood Foresters in 1905. He became adjutant of his regiment in 1910.

Brownrigg served in the First World War with the 13th (Western) Division and fought at Gallipoli in 1915 and then in the Mesopotamian campaign during the remaining years of the war. In November 1915 he became the division's assistant adjutant and quartermaster general and was to have the temporary rank of lieutenant colonel while employed in this role. He was promoted to brevet major, "for Distinguished Service in the Field", in February 1916 although this was later antedated back to January. He was awarded the Distinguished Service Order later that year. He ended the war in 1918 as a lieutenant colonel, and had also been mentioned in dispatches six times.

After the war Brownrigg became deputy assistant adjutant general at the War Office and, after attending the Staff College, Camberley, from 1920 to 1921, then became an instructor at the Royal Military College Sandhurst. He returned to the War Office as a general service officer in 1923 and, promoted in July 1925 to brevet colonel, became assistant adjutant and quartermaster general for the Shanghai Defence Force in China in 1927. He was placed in charge of Administration for the North China Command in 1928. He was promoted to major general in March 1931, shortly after being placed on half-pay. He was appointed commander of the 159th (Welsh Border) Infantry Brigade in 1933 and, after being granted the rank of major general on 16 July 1934, became general officer commanding (GOC) of the 51st (Highland) Division in 1935. He became a substantive lieutenant general on 29 January 1938 and Military Secretary later in the year and director general of the Territorial Army (TA) in 1939.

Brownrigg took part in the Second World War as adjutant-general of the British Expeditionary Force in 1939. He was subjected to some criticism for his erratic orders during the defence of Calais, and was involuntarily retired in 1940. In January 1941 he succeeded Major General Sir Frederick Maurice as colonel of the Sherwood Foresters.

Brownrigg was a sector and zone commander for the Home Guard for the rest of the war. In late 1942, Brownrigg was employed as the military advisor for the British film The Life and Death of Colonel Blimp. The film was about an officer called Major-General Wynne-Candy, whose fictional career was rather similar to Brownrigg's, as he had served with distinction in the First World War, was forcibly retired after Dunkirk and then had taken a senior role in the Home Guard.

== Personal life ==
In 1919 Brownrigg married Mona Jeffreys. Sir Douglas and Lady Brownrigg were keen dog breeders who imported two of the first Shih Tzus into the United Kingdom from China. His memoirs; Unexpected (a book of memories), were published in 1942.

== Bibliography ==
- Smart, Nick (2005). Biographical Dictionary of British Generals of the Second World War. Barnesley: Pen & Sword. ISBN 1844150496.

Military offices
Preceded by Sir James Burnett	GOC 51st (Highland) Division; 1935–1938	Succeeded by Victor Fortune
Preceded by Viscount Gort	Military Secretary; 1938–1939	Succeeded by Sir George Giffard
