= Wilfrid Lindsell =

British Army general (1884–1973)

Lieutenant-General Sir Wilfrid Lindsell GBE KCB DSO MC
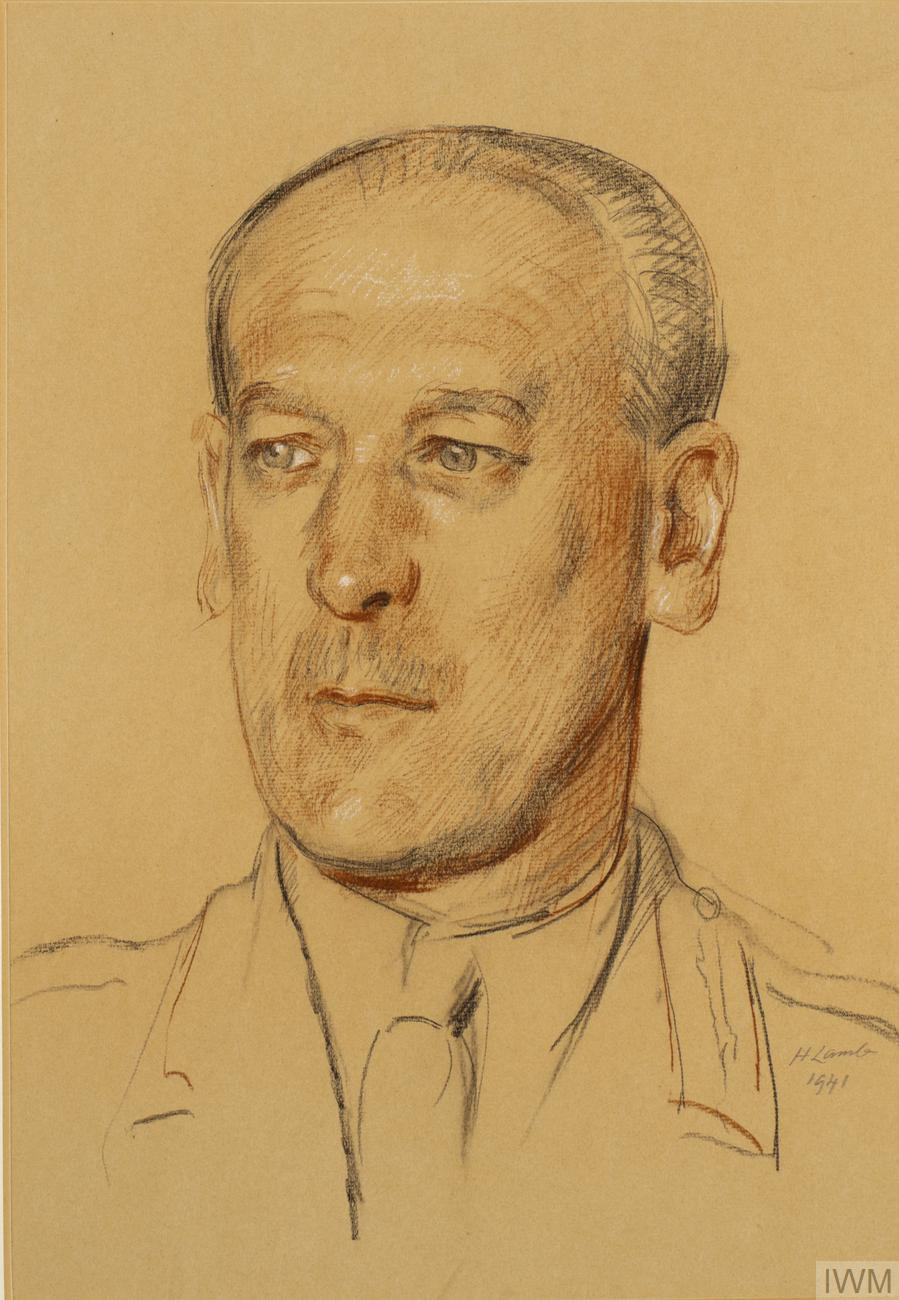
- Born: 29 September 1884
- Died: 2 May 1973 (aged 88)
- Military career
- Allegiance: United Kingdom
- Branch: British Army
- Service years: 1903–1945
- Rank: Lieutenant-General
- Service number: 6156
- Commands: Senior Officers' School, Sheerness
- Conflicts: First World War; Second World War
- Awards: Knight Grand Cross of the Order of the British Empire; Knight Commander of the Order of the Bath; Distinguished Service Order; Military Cross; Mentioned in Despatches; Croix de Guerre (France)

Lieutenant-General Sir Wilfrid Gordon Lindsell, GBE, KCB, DSO, MC (29 September 1884 – 2 May 1973) was a senior British Army logistics officer in the Second World War.

== Early life and military career ==
Lindsell was born in Portsmouth, a son of Colonel Robert Frederick Lindsell and Kathleen, née Eaton, and was educated at Birkenhead School, Victoria College, Jersey. He was commissioned into the Royal Garrison Artillery from Royal Military Academy, Woolwich, in 1903. After gunnery school, he served in Malta before becoming an extra aide-de-camp to Major General Sir Harry Barron, the governor of Tasmania and then the governor of Western Australia, in November 1910.

On the outbreak of the First World War, Lindsell returned home and served in France and Belgium between 1914 and 1918 as a staff captain in the Royal Artillery, then as brigade major. He was four times mentioned in despatches, and awarded the Military Cross in 1916, the Distinguished Service Order in 1918, the French Croix de Guerre in 1918 and appointed an Officer of the Order of the British Empire in 1919.

== Between the wars ==
In 1919 Lindsell attended the first post-war course at the Staff College, Camberley, and was then appointed a Deputy Assistant Adjutant-General in the War Office before spending four years as an instructor at the School of Military Administration from 1921 to 1925. While there he wrote the first edition of the textbook Military Organisation and Administration (published in 1923) that lasted through 29 editions into the 1960s. After this he was appointed instructor in military administration at the Staff College 1925–1928. Attendance at the Imperial Defence College in 1930 was followed by a post as General Staff Officer Grade 1 at the War Office, 1930–1933. In 1931 he became a full colonel and in 1933 he became a brigadier and commandant of the Senior Officers School in Sheerness, then deputy military secretary in the War Office 1935–1936, before becoming commander of Royal Artillery 4th Division, 1937–1938.

== Second World War ==
Lindsell was promoted to major-general in command of Administration for Southern Command, 1938–1939 and was appointed the quartermaster-general on mobilisation of the British Expeditionary Force in France and Belgium, 1939–1940, until the evacuation from Dunkirk. After Dunkirk he became quartermaster-general of Home Forces and set about re-building the army from Kneller Hall in Twickenham. After a year he became senior military advisor to the Ministry of Supply under Sir Andrew Duncan and Lord Beaverbrook. In less than a year the army had thirteen fully equipped and trained divisions to repel a German invasion. In 1942 he became one of General Bernard Montgomery's team to revitalise the Eighth Army as lieutenant-general in charge of administration in GHQ Middle East. In a broadcast concerning the capture of Tripoli the British Secretary for War, Sir P.J. Grigg, said that much of the credit for the Eighth Army's phenomenal advance was due to the quartermaster-general's staff under Lt General Sir Wilfrid Lindsell. During the Second World War he was mentioned in despatches on three more occasions.

At the end of 1943 Lindsell moved east to become principal administrative officer in GHQ India prepared General Sir William Slim's Fourteenth Army to attack the Japanese in Burma. Here he played the most significant role in mobilising Indian resources, establishing production capabilities and building the foundations for the Indian defence industry. After returning from India he was attached to the Board of Trade to co-ordinate the clearing of factories for peacetime production.

== Postwar ==
Lindsell retired from the army in December 1945. He was awarded the Legion of Merit honour by the American government with Degree of Commander on 17 October 1946.

He became governor and commandant of the Church Lads' Brigade (1948–1954) and was a Church Commissioner (1948–1959). From 1946 to 1955 he was chairman of the board of Ely Breweries. He was awarded an honorary doctorate by Aberdeen University.

He married Marjorie Ellis (died 1957). They had two daughters and a son who died in infancy. In 1958 he married Evelyn Nairn (died 1982). He died in London on 2 May 1973.

== Publications ==
- Military Organisation and Administration, 1943, publ. Gale & Polden Ltd

== Bibliography ==
- Mead, Richard (2007). Churchill's Lions: A Biographical Guide to the Key British Generals of World War II. Stroud (UK): Spellmount. p. 544 pages. ISBN 978-1-86227-431-0.
- Smart, Nick (2005). Biographical Dictionary of British Generals of the Second World War. Barnsley, U.K.: Pen & Sword Military. ISBN 1-84415-049-6.

Military offices
| Preceded by Andrew McCulloch | Commandant of the Senior Officers' School, Sheerness; 1933–1935 | Succeeded by Robert Pollok |
