= Victor Fortune =

British Army general (1883–1949)

Major-General Sir Victor Fortune KBE CB DSO DL
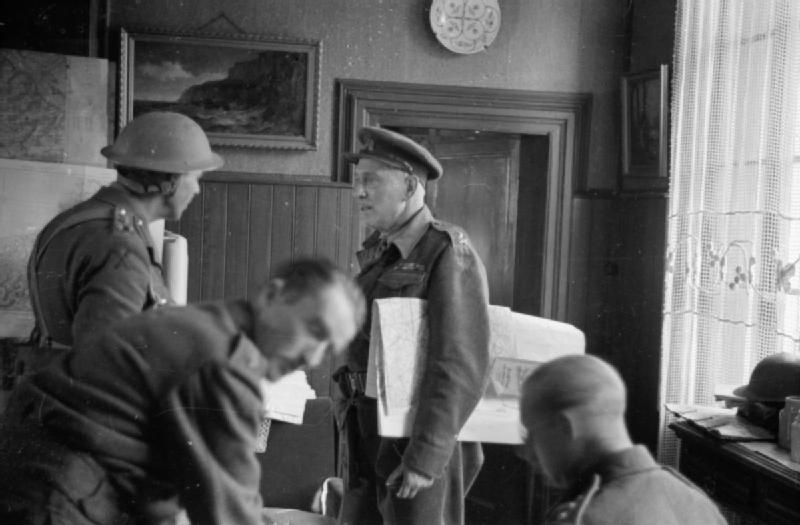
- Major-General Victor Fortune, commanding 51st (Highland) Division, at his HQ at Le Caudroy, France on 8 June 1940
- Born: 21 August 1883; Blelack, Scotland
- Died: 2 January 1949 (aged 65); Dalswinton, Scotland
- Military career
- Allegiance: United Kingdom
- Branch: British Army
- Service years: 1903–1945
- Rank: Major-General
- Service number: 18362
- Unit: Black Watch
- Commands: 51st (Highland) Infantry Division; 52nd (Lowland) Infantry Division; 5th Infantry Brigade; 1st Battalion, Seaforth Highlanders; 46th Infantry Brigade; 1st Battalion, Black Watch (Royal Highland Regiment)
- Conflicts: First World War; Second World War
- Awards: Knight Commander of the Order of the British Empire; Companion of the Order of the Bath; Distinguished Service Order; Mentioned in Despatches (6); Legion of Honour (France); Order of the Phoenix (Greece)
- Other work: Deputy lieutenant, County of Perth; Honorary Colonel, The Seaforth Highlanders

Major-General Sir Victor Morven Fortune, KBE, CB, DSO, DL (21 August 1883 – 2 January 1949) was a senior officer of the British Army. He saw service in both the First and Second World Wars. He commanded the 51st (Highland) Infantry Division during the Battle of France and was subsequently trapped and obliged to surrender to the Germans on 12 June 1940.

== Military career ==
After being educated at Winchester and the Royal Military College, Sandhurst, Fortune was commissioned as a second lieutenant in the British Army from December 1903, joining the 1st Battalion, The Black Watch (Royal Highlanders). In November 1906 he was promoted to lieutenant.

By the outbreak of the First World War Fortune had risen to the rank of lieutenant and was serving as a platoon commander in A Company under Major Lord George Stewart-Murray. The battalion sailed to France in August 1914, where Fortune saw initial action during the Retreat from Mons and the First Battle of the Marne. In September, he was promoted to captain, taking command of A Company following the death of Stewart-Murray at the First Battle of the Aisne. Fortune led A Company ably through the First Battle of Ypres before moving up to battalion headquarters as adjutant on 11 November, where he saw further action at Givenchy, Cuinchy, Neuve Chapelle, and Aubers Ridge.

Fortune served as battalion adjutant until 30 September 1915, when he was appointed as brigade major to the 1st Infantry Brigade, serving in this key role during the costly Battle of Loos. Almost exactly a year later, on 16 September 1916, Fortune returned to the 1st Battalion the Black Watch (Royal Highlanders) when, as an acting lieutenant colonel, he was appointed commanding officer during the Battle of the Somme. He led the battalion competently through the final stages of the Battle of the Somme and the later Battle of Passchendaele before a transfer to command the Fourth Army Musketry School in January 1918. Fortune ended the war as commander of the 46th Infantry Brigade with the rank of acting brigadier general, having been promoted to that rank in June. During his wartime service, Fortune was awarded the Distinguished Service Order (DSO) and five times was mentioned in despatches.

After attending the Staff College, Camberley, from 1920 to 1921, Fortune returned to Sandhurst, this time as an instructor. Promoted major in January 1923, he was appointed assistant commandant of the Small Arms School, Hythe, Kent, in succession to Brevet Colonel Thomas Dalby. This was followed in 1925 by a brief return to the 1st Battalion, the Black Watch (Royal Highlanders) in India; and then on 10 January 1927, having been promoted to substantive lieutenant colonel, he was appointed commanding officer of the 1st Battalion, Seaforth Highlanders, succeeding Kenneth Buchanan.

In January 1930 Fortune was promoted to colonel, with seniority backdated to January 1923, and appointed GSO1 of the 5th Infantry Division. He was subsequently commander of the 5th Infantry Brigade in March 1932 and became aide-de-camp to King George V in April 1934, in succession to Brigadier Bertram Sergison-Brooke, and was promoted to major general in January 1935. He relinquished command of his brigade in April 1935 and was placed on half-pay until being made general officer commanding of the 52nd (Lowland) Infantry Division in September 1935. He commanded the division, a Territorial Army formation, until August 1936, when he again went on half-pay, before becoming commander of South Western Area in April 1937. He was GOC of the 51st (Highland) Infantry Division, another TA formation, in 1937.

The 51st Division remained in France after the general evacuation from Dunkirk, having been assigned to the French IX Corps. After naval evacuation proved impossible and supplies of ammunition had been exhausted, Major-General Fortune was forced to surrender the greater part of the Highland Division at St Valery en Caux.

Fortune spent the rest of the war as a prisoner of war. As a senior British officer in captivity in Germany, he worked to improve the conditions of the men under his command. He suffered a stroke in 1944 but refused repatriation. He was finally liberated in April 1945 and appointed a Knight Commander of the Order of the British Empire shortly after.

General Charles de Gaulle stated, "For my part, I can say that the comradeship of arms, sealed on the battlefield of Abbeville in May–June 1940, between the French armoured division, which I had the honour to command, and the gallant 51st Scottish Division under General Fortune, played its part in the decision which I made to continue the fight at the side of the Allies, to the end, come what may". And he concluded by quoting the old motto of the Garde Ecossaise: omni modo fidelis – faithful in every way.

== Bibliography ==
- Smart, Nick (2005). Biographical Dictionary of British Generals of the Second World War. Pen and Sword. ISBN 1844150496.

Military offices
Preceded by Andrew McCulloch	GOC 52nd (Lowland) Infantry Division; 1935–1936	Succeeded by Andrew McCulloch
Preceded by Douglas Brownrigg	GOC 51st (Highland) Infantry Division; 1938–1940	Succeeded by Alan Cunningham
