= Lashmer Whistler =

British Army General (1898–1963)

General Sir Lashmer Whistler GCB KBE DSO & Two Bars DL
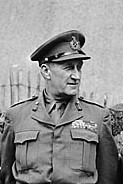
- Whistler in 1954
- Born: 3 September 1898; Kasauli, Ambala District, Punjab, British India (now in Solan district, Himachal Pradesh, India)
- Died: 4 July 1963 (aged 64); Cambridge Military Hospital, Hampshire, England
- Military career
- Allegiance: United Kingdom
- Branch: British Army
- Service years: 1916–1957
- Rank: General
- Nicknames: "Bolo" "Private Bolo"
- Service number: 13017
- Unit: Royal Sussex Regiment
- Commands: Western Command (1953–57); West Africa Command (1951–53); Northumbrian District and 50th (Northumbrian) Infantry Division (1950–51); 3rd Infantry Division (1944–47); 160th Infantry Brigade (1944); 131st Infantry Brigade (1942–44); 132nd Infantry Brigade (1942); 4th Battalion, Royal Sussex Regiment (1940–42)
- Conflicts: First World War; Russian Civil War; Arab revolt in Palestine; Second World War; Palestine Emergency
- Awards: Knight Grand Cross of the Order of the Bath; Knight Commander of the Order of the British Empire; Distinguished Service Order & Two Bars; Mentioned in Despatches (4); Commander of the Order of the Crown (Belgium); Croix de guerre (Belgium); Grand Cross of the Order of the House of Orange (Netherlands)
- Other work: Chairman, Committee on the New Army (1957)

General Sir Lashmer Gordon Whistler, GCB, KBE, DSO & Two Bars, DL (3 September 1898 – 4 July 1963), known as "Bolo", was a British Army officer who served in both the world wars. A junior officer during the First World War, during the Second World War he achieved senior rank serving with Field Marshal Sir Bernard Montgomery in North Africa and North-western Europe from 1942 to 1945. Montgomery considered that Whistler "was about the best infantry brigade commander I knew". In peacetime, his outstanding powers of leadership were shown in a series of roles in the decolonisation process, and he reached the four-star rank of a full general, without having attended the Staff College, Camberley, then considered almost essential for an officer wishing to attain high rank, and which a significant majority of the British generals of the war had attended. This, in Richard Mead's words, was, "proof that lacking a Staff College qualification was no barrier to advancement for the right man."

== Early life and military career ==
Whistler was the son of Colonel Albert Edward Whistler of the British Indian Army and his wife Florence Annie Gordon Rivett-Carnac, daughter of Charles Forbes Rivett-Carnac. The younger of two sons, he was born on 3 September 1898 in British India but went to England with his mother and elder brother soon afterwards, and was educated at St Cyprian's School, where he was an outstanding sportsman, and on the recommendation of the headmaster was awarded a sporting scholarship at Harrow School. He played cricket for Harrow, and was to remain a redoubtable batsman throughout his career.

He entered the Royal Military College, Sandhurst, on 3 November 1916, during the First World War, just two months after his eighteenth birthday. He was commissioned as a second lieutenant into the Royal Sussex Regiment of the British Army on 11 September 1917, eight days after his nineteenth birthday. After serving briefly with the 3rd (Reserve) Battalion, he was posted, in late October, to the 13th (Service) Battalion, then serving in the trenches of the Western Front, as part of the 116th Brigade of the 39th Division, a Kitchener's Army unit. He was wounded twice, and, on the second occasion, during the Imperial German Army's Spring Offensive in late March 1918, he was taken as a prisoner of war (POW) by the Germans before he had recovered. Later, he managed to escape from a prison train, but was re-captured within 20 yards of the Dutch border. He was then held at Ulrich Gasse in Cologne where he lost five stone and could hardly walk by the end of the war. Of the war, he said, in a broadcast on the Midland Home Service, titled "A Soldier's Life", in early February 1957, "It was a beastly war, with mud and cold and gas attacks and terrible casualties. I saw nothing to compare with it in the last war. Conscription came late in that war and the best of the country was lost."

== Between the wars ==
In 1919, after the end of the First World War, Whistler, after being released by the Germans, remained in the army and was promoted to lieutenant in March. He also volunteered to join the Relief Force being sent to support the British Garrison at Archangel. He was posted to the 45th Battalion, Royal Fusiliers and saw some action on the River Dvina until its withdrawal when the White Russian Army was defeated elsewhere. It was his recounting of many anecdotes about the Bolsheviks that gave rise to his nickname of "Bolo". He was posted to the 1st Battalion, Royal Sussex in October 1919. Serving with the British Army of the Rhine (BAOR), he found his company quartered in the same Ulrich Gasse barracks where he had been a POW in the previous year. However, on the last day of the year he was sent to Ireland as one of the replacements for fourteen British officers who had been murdered the previous November. He remained in Ireland for four years and then went as acting adjutant to the Regimental Depot at Chichester.

Shortly afterwards, he was sent to Hong Kong to protect British interests during civil war in China. He qualified as Italian interpreter in 1928. He was appointed adjutant of the 5th (Cinque Ports) Battalion, Royal Sussex, a Territorial Army (TA) unit, as a temporary captain on 1 May 1929, this becoming a permanent rank on 30 September 1932. In 1933 he was posted to Karachi and then to Egypt at the time of Benito Mussolini's Italian invasion of Ethiopial It took Whistler twenty-one years after being commissioned to achieve the rank of major which he attained in August 1938, shortly before his 40th birthday. In 1938 he became adjutant of the 2nd Battalion, Royal Sussex and served in Palestine during the Arab revolt until the outbreak of the Second World War in September 1939. Unlike a large number of British commanders who were to attain high rank in the upcoming war, Whistler had not qualified for the staff colleges at either Camberley or Quetta, having twice failed the entrance examination for the former, and confided in his old Harrow and Sandhurst friend, Reginald Dorman-Smith, the younger brother of Eric Dorman-Smith, that he would end his military career in command of a battalion at most. With little prospect of advancement to higher command, "Bolo" Whistler had seriously been considering leaving the army for civilian life when war broke out.

== Second World War ==
=== France and Belgium, Dunkirk, and England ===
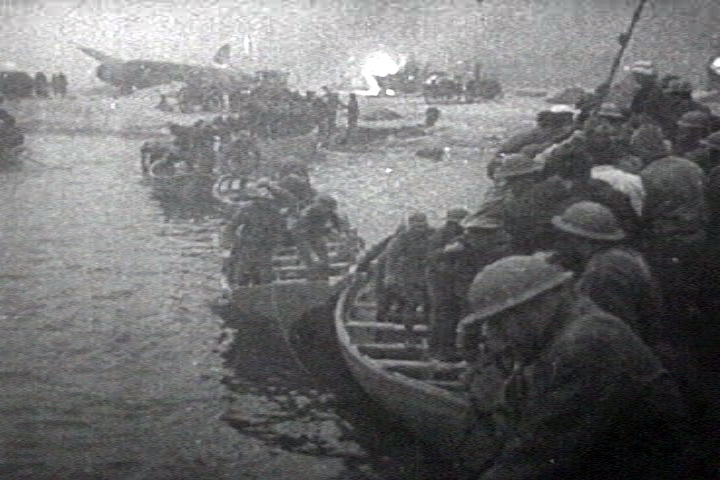
British troops escaping from Dunkirk in lifeboats. Bolo Whistler was "The man who went back".

When the Second World War broke out on 3 September 1939, on Whistler's 41st birthday, he was commanding the regimental depot at Chichester. However, on 5 February 1940 he became an acting lieutenant colonel and was appointed commanding officer (CO) of the 4th Battalion, Royal Sussex Regiment, a TA unit. Major Bernard Fitzalan-Howard, 16th Duke of Norfolk was commanding the battalion's HQ Company. The battalion formed part of Brigadier John Utterson-Kelso's 133rd Infantry Brigade (containing the 2nd, 4th and 5th Battalions of the Royal Sussex Regiment and often referred to as the Royal Sussex Brigade), which formed part of the 44th (Home Counties) Infantry Division, then under Major General Edmund Osborne. The battalion was on stand-by to go to Finland, but this did not happen. Whistler worked hard to transform the TA battalion into fighting shape and on 8 April they embarked at Southampton for Cherbourg, France, to serve as part of the British Expeditionary Force (BEF).

Just over a month later, the German Army launched its long-awaited offensive on the Western Front. The battalion moved to the Belgian border and to Courtrai. Under constant German bombardment, Whistler had sent a famous message to Brigade Headquarters "Please may I have half a Hurricane for half an hour". As the Germans advanced during the Battle of France, the battalion took up a defensive position at Caestre. An officer, Peter Hadley, reported finding Whistler "standing in the middle of the street with a positive hail of explosives coming down all around". While his subordinates crouched by the side of the road, he, "stood there with his hands in his pockets, laughing at us." Although attacked by tanks, planes and heavy artillery, the stand at Caestre was so strong that the Germans decided to by-pass this pocket of resistance. Whistler was awarded the Distinguished Service Order (DSO) for his leadership of the battalion in France. Orders were issued to withdraw to Dunkirk and most of the battalion evacuated to England on 30 May. Whistler became known as "The Man who went Back to Dunkirk". Although secrecy surrounds this operation, however, Whistler's adjutant, then-Captain J. B. Ashworth (later to succeed Whistler as Colonel of the Royal Sussex Regiment), was convinced he returned to look for any missing men, and the records show that he came back separately to the United Kingdom with the 5th Battalion of the Manchester Regiment, part of the 127th Brigade of Major General William Holmes's 42nd (East Lancashire) Infantry Division, on 1 June. Ironically, the 127th Brigade was, at that time, commanded by Brigadier John Smyth, who was later to write Whistler's biography.

For the next two years, the 44th Division, after moving briefly to Gloucestershire and then Yorkshire, served as part of XII Corps, defending Kent against a potential German invasion of the United Kingdom. The 44th Division was commanded successively by Major Generals Arthur Percival, Noel Mason-MacFarlane and Brian Horrocks. It was both Horrocks, who commanded the division between June 1941 and March 1942, and the general officer commanding (GOC) of XII Corps, Lieutenant-General Bernard Montgomery, both of whom were to play a significant part in Whistler's subsequent career, who recognised his leadership potential. Montgomery wrote that he, "first met Bolo Whistler in 1941... When I inspected his battalion and quickly realised that he was well above the ordinary run of battalion commanders and I decided not to lose sight of him." He also stated that during the fighting in North Africa, he, "realised what a fine soldier he was; I decided to take him with me wherever I might go during the war, and after. This I did, and never once did I have cause to regret my choice." After the war Montgomery was to record that he had thought Whistler was the best infantry brigade commander in the British Army and that he had done well at divisional level as well.

=== North Africa ===
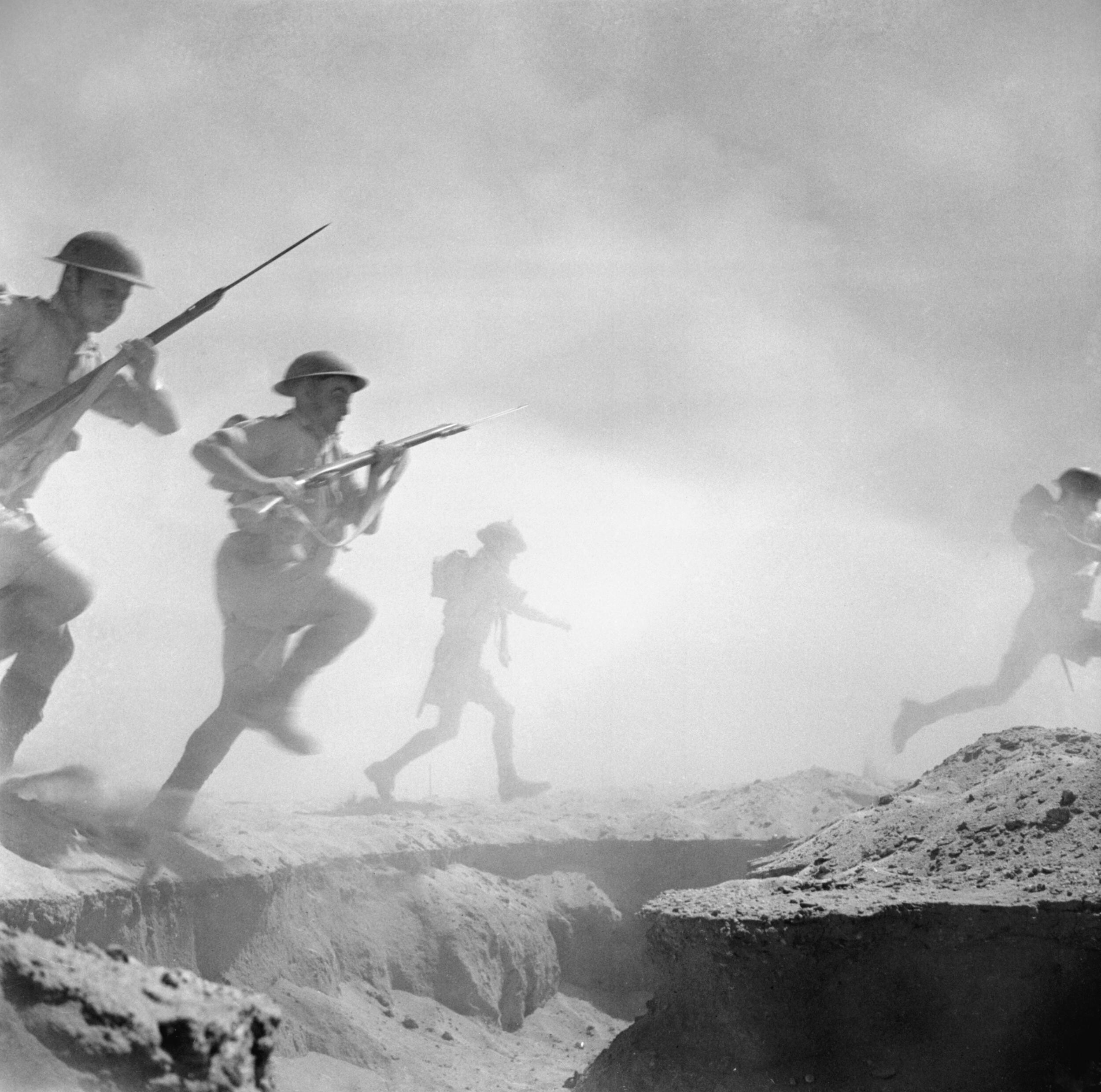
Infantry advance during the Battle of El Alamein.

In May 1942 the 44th Division, now commanded by Major General Ivor Hughes after Horrocks was posted elsewhere to command the 9th Armoured Division, received the news that it was to prepare for overseas service and the division left England towards the end of the month, for an unknown destination. While at sea the division heard about the fall of Tobruk in mid-June, resulting in the division being re-routed for Suez, Egypt, where it landed in the last week of July. In August, Whistler arrived with the 44th Division in Egypt to join XIII Corps of the British Eighth Army. XIII Corps was commanded by Lieutenant-General Brian Horrocks, while the Eighth Army was taken over by Lieutenant-General Bernard Montgomery, both of whom had recently arrived in Egypt, and were again destined to be Whistler's superiors. Whistler's battalion was assigned to the Alam el Halfa Ridge for the Battle of Alam el Halfa, although most of the action took place below. The commander of the 133rd Infantry Brigade in the 44th Division fell ill in late August and Whistler temporarily replaced him. In early September, promoted to the acting rank of brigadier, he was subsequently transferred to command of the 132nd Infantry Brigade, part of the 44th Division, which he led during the Battle of El Alamein where it took over ground captured on 25 October and where he and his brigade major were slightly wounded.

As the advance moved forward to Benghazi, Whistler was transferred to command the 131st Lorried Infantry Brigade on 19 December 1942. This brigade (composed of three TA battalions, the 1/5th, 1/6th and 1/7th, of the Queen's Royal Regiment (West Surrey) and often referred to as "The Queen's Brigade") had originally arrived in Egypt as part of the 44th Division but by this time was the mobile infantry element of the 7th Armoured Division, the famous "Desert Rats", after the 44th Division was broken up. The 7th Armoured Division, which also comprised the 22nd Armoured Brigade under Brigadier Philip "Pip" Roberts and supporting units, was then commanded by Major-General John Harding. Whistler led the 131st Brigade, which, because of its role with armour, was often in the forefront of events, through the rest of the fighting in North Africa until the surrender of the Axis forces in Tunisia in May 1943. Whistler led his troops through the Battle of El Agheila in December 1942, the capture of Tripoli in mid-January 1943, where the division's GOC, Major-General Harding, was severely injured by shellfire and replaced by Major-General George "Bobby" Erskine, and along the coastal strip, capturing Msallata, Zuwara, Zaltan and Pisida. The brigade then took part in the Battle of Medenine on 6 March 1943 and the Battle of the Mareth Line at the end of March. Whistler's frequent visits to the front line earned him the nickname of "Private Bolo".

In the latter stages of the Tunisian campaign, the 7th Armoured Division was, in late April, transferred to Lieutenant General Kenneth Anderson's British First Army, joining IX Corps, which by that time was commanded by Horrocks (transferred over from the Eighth Army), after the original GOC, Lieutenant-General John Crocker (another of Whistler's future superiors), was injured and temporarily replaced by Horrocks. Whistler was awarded the first bar to his DSO in April 1943 for "gallant and distinguished services in the Middle East", and by 12 May 1943 all Axis resistance in Tunis had ended and the fighting in North Africa, after almost three years, was finished. Whistler wrote in his diary, on 8 May, "Tunis is ours and the first real infantry in were the Queen's. 7th Armoured went right through. [1/]7 Queen's had a bit of street fighting in Tunis−two wounded, 4,000 prisoners taken. Of course the [22nd] Armoured Bde did all the real work. I do not believe they lost a tank from enemy action. I have fought in two Divisions, 44th and 7th Armoured, and have carried the sign of the 44th to Tunis."

=== Italy ===
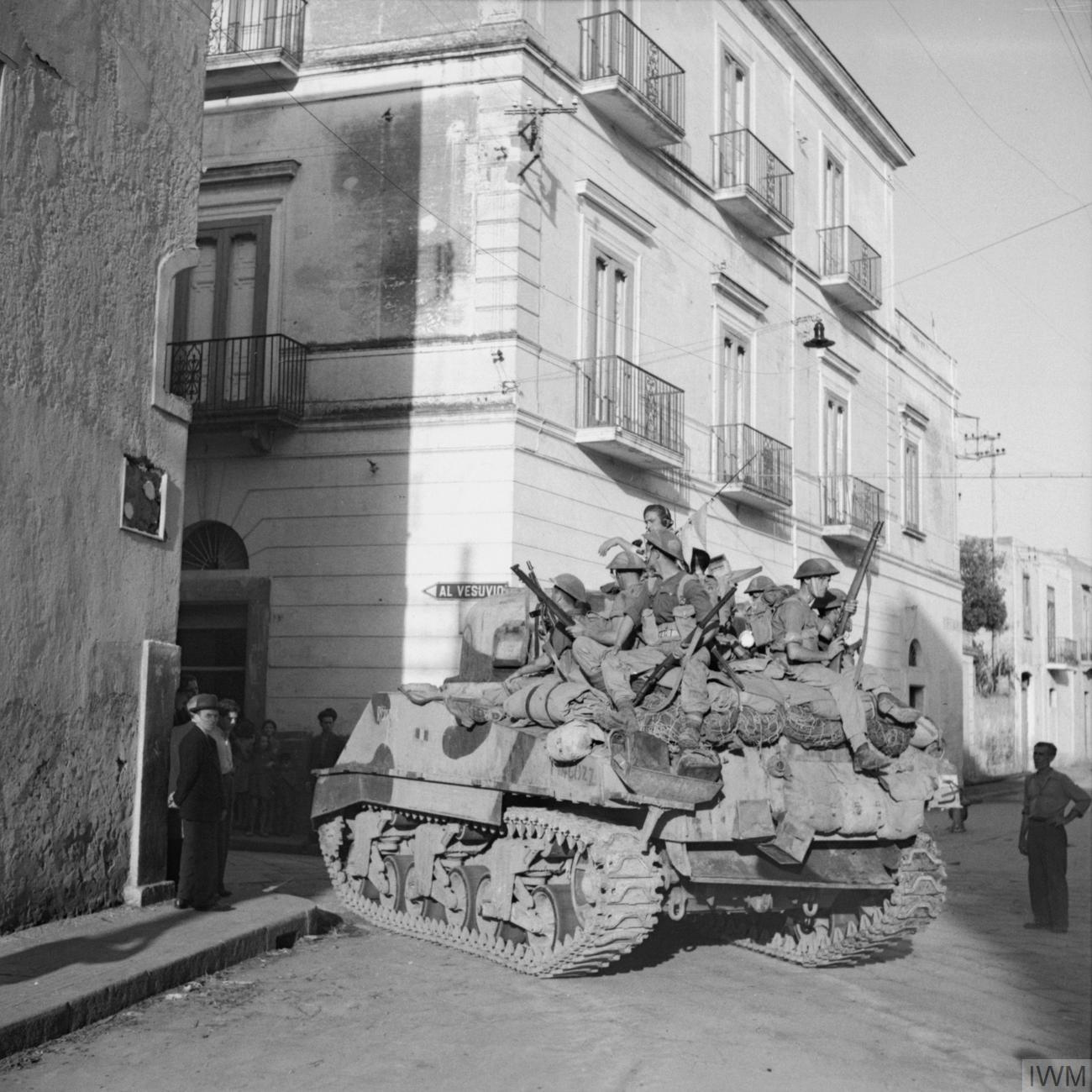
Sherman tank of the Royal Scots Greys carrying men of the 1/6th Battalion, Queen's Royal Regiment during mopping up operations in Torre Annunciata, Italy, 1 October 1943.

For two months in the summer of 1943, the 7th Armoured remained at Homs for rest and training while the Allied invasion of Sicily took place. Whistler then took the 131st Brigade to join Lieutenant General Brian Horrocks's British X Corps, in the Salerno landings (codenamed Operation Avalanche) in September 1943, although initially only Whistler and a few of his brigade HQ staff accompanied him. X Corps, commanded from late August by Lieutenant-General Sir Richard McCreery after Horrocks was severely injured by a German aircraft, formed part of Lieutenant General Mark W. Clark's American Fifth Army. The brigade arrived at the Salerno beachhead on 15 September and was initially held in reserve for the 46th and 56th Infantry Divisions, then engaged in very heavy fighting. For the next stage in the Italian Campaign, he had the 5th Royal Tank Regiment under his command as well as 131st Brigade in the break through to Vietri sul Mare. After the liberation of Naples, they crossed the River Volturno on 12 October in a tough fight under cover of darkness. There Whistler, by this time "very scruffy" and looking like a skeleton, met General Dwight D. Eisenhower, the American Supreme Allied Commander in the Mediterranean Theater of Operations (MTO), but shortly after had to spend a few days in hospital with a fever. Whistler's troops then broke through at Monte Massico through the gap between the Garigliano and Sessa Aurunca and met up with the British 46th Division.

In November, the 7th Armoured Division, now withdrawn from combat, received the news that it was to be transferred to the "Imperial Strategic Reserve" and would return to the United Kingdom, to spearhead the Allied invasion of Normandy. The division was chosen by Montgomery, who was returning to England to take command of the Anglo-Canadian 21st Army Group, which controlled all Allied ground forces for the invasion and subsequent campaign in Normandy. For his services in Italy Whistler was awarded a second Bar to his DSO. Whistler maintained a diary to which he committed his private thoughts, often questioning his own courage and abilities. On the way back to England on 1 January 1944 he wrote "getting near England, Home, Beauty and the Brats. I don't think I have made any good resolutions but hope to keep fifteen minutes ahead of my job for the rest of the war. I would like to be able to do something towards peace afterwards, but am too simple a soldier probably to be of any use... A bit nervous of the great offensive but do not wish to miss it – wish I could go on with this outfit but have been too long with it. Am not fit for an Armoured Div and do not want a Bum Inf Div. What a life."

=== Normandy and North West Europe ===
Insignia of the 3rd Division.

In mid-January 1944 Whistler was informed in a letter by his GOC, Major-General Erskine, that he was to be transferred to command the 160th Infantry Brigade, part of the 53rd (Welsh) Infantry Division, ahead of the operations in Normandy. Erskine wrote that Montgomery, "made the public announcement to about 300 brass hats that you were the best and most experienced Brigadier in the British Army." The 53rd Division, under the command of Major General Robert Ross, of the Queen's Royal Regiment, was a first-line TA formation which had been based in Northern Ireland and England throughout the war and Montgomery's policy was to give a few experienced commanders to inexperienced brigades and divisions. The division was due to land in Normandy in late June, as part of XII Corps, under Lieutenant General Neil Ritchie, itself forming part of Lieutenant-General Miles Dempsey's British Second Army, all of which came under Montgomery's 21st Army Group. Although disappointed to leave the 131st Brigade, Whistler was consoled by Montgomery, who informed him that he had selected him to command a division at the earliest opportunity.

This came much sooner than expected, however, as just a week after D-Day (6 June 1944) the GOC of Montgomery's old division, the 3rd Infantry Division, Major-General Tom Rennie, was wounded and Montgomery called for Whistler and gave him command of the division, with the rank of acting major-general. (Note: Although as commonly happened during the war, his permanent rank was still only major/war substantive lieutenant colonel. He was only promoted lieutenant colonel in January 1945, and full colonel in February 1946 with seniority as of June 1945.)

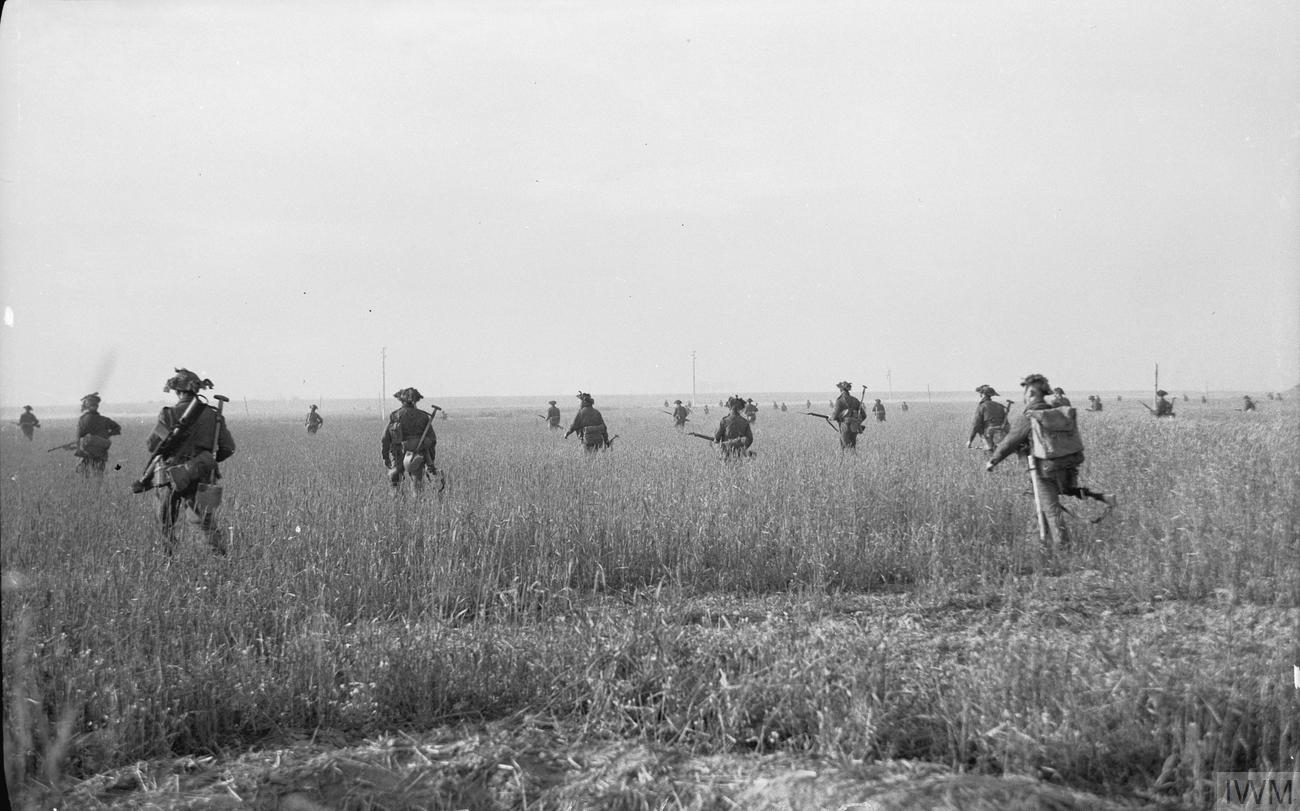
Men of the 2nd Battalion, Royal Warwickshire Regiment advancing through a wheatfield during the final assault on Caen, 9 July 1944. During the preliminary bombardment, 450 Royal Air Force (RAF) heavy bombers had dropped 2,500 tons on the town.

Whistler commanded the division throughout the campaign in north-west Europe. The 3rd Division captured Caen on 9 July during Operation Charnwood and then took part in Operation Goodwood. The division was extracted from the stalemate and assigned to Caumont-sur-Orne in Operation Bluecoat in the drive past Vire. Corporal Sidney Bates of the 1st Battalion, Royal Norfolk Regiment was posthumously awarded the Victoria Cross (VC) around this time. The division captured Flers on 18 August. On 3 September, Whistler's forty-sixth birthday, the 3rd Division began a move forward which was to take it 150 miles with its major action at the crossing of the Meuse-Escaut canal on 18 September. The division participated in Operation Market Garden and then in the Battle of Overloon, taking over from the U.S. 7th Armoured Division, to capture Overloon and Venray on 18 October after suffering heavy casualties. One of Whistler's subordinates observed the effect Whistler had on his troops: "I saw an infantry battalion on its way into battle. They were resting on both sides of the road when Bolo came back from the sharp end. He was driving himself, flag flying and his hat, as usual, on the back of his head. Every man stood up and waved to him as he went past, laughing and waving in reply."

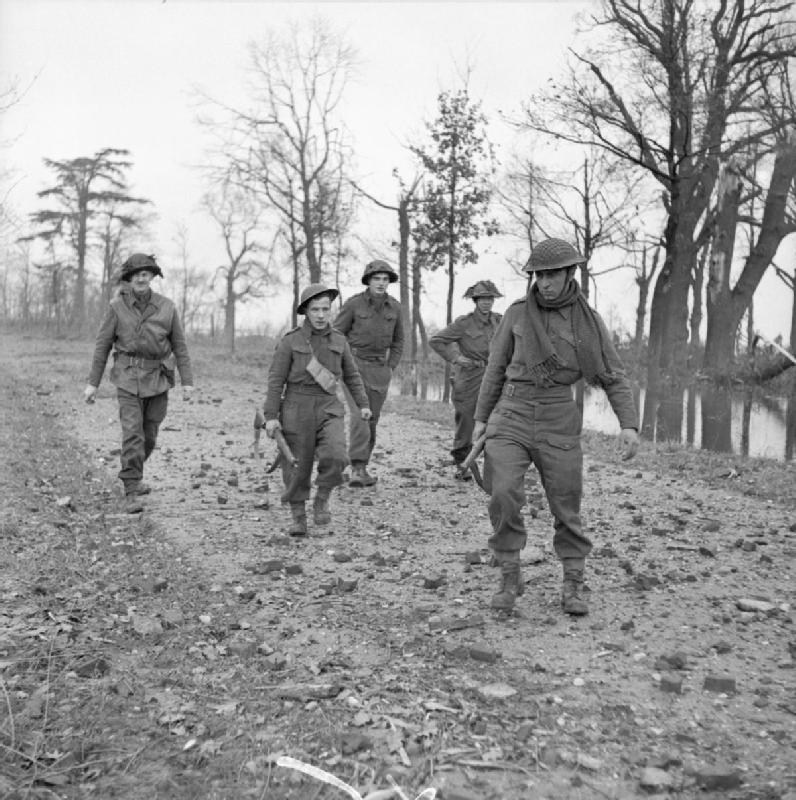
A reconnaissance patrol from the 1st Battalion, Suffolk Regiment return to the lines during operations to capture a castle on the banks of the Maas near Geijsteren, 1 December 1944.

For the following three-and-a-half months, the 3rd Division was committed to hold the line along the Maas River. On 24 January Whistler left for a months' worth of leave, the division temporarily being commanded by Major General Alexander Galloway. Whistler returned from leave to find his division on the move under Operation Veritable, towards the end of which Private James Stokes of the 2nd Battalion, King's Shropshire Light Infantry was posthumously awarded the VC, the second and last to be awarded to the division during the campaign. They reached the River Rhine on 12 March. Whistler's headquarters were in Schloss Moyland, where he was visited by Winston Churchill, the British Prime Minister, wearing the uniform of Honorary Colonel of the 5th (Cinque Ports) Battalion of the Royal Sussex Regiment in tribute to Whistler. From 27 to 30 March, the division crossed the Rhine and headed towards the River Elbe, crossing the Dortmund-Ems Canal at Lingen against stiff resistance. On 7 April, the 3rd Division was transferred to Ritchie's XII Corps and headed east with them to Bremen. From 13 to 20 April, the 3rd Division saw heavy fighting outside the town and on 26 April captured the ruins of the town.

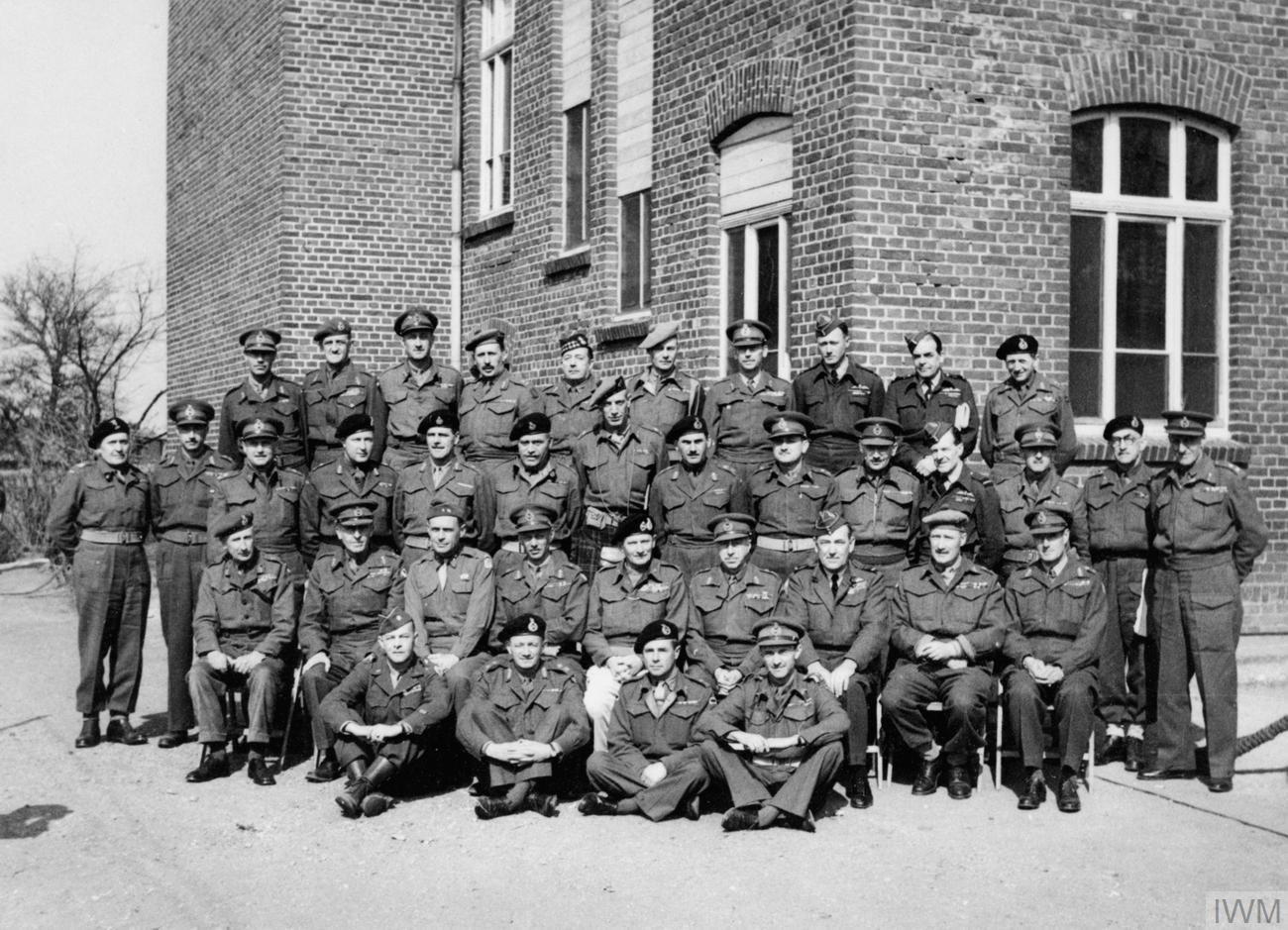
Field Marshal Sir Bernard Montgomery poses for a group photograph with his staff, corps and divisional commanders at Walbeck, Germany, after issuing his final orders for the Rhine Crossing, 22 March 1945. Pictured standing in the back row, third from the left, is Major General L. G. "Bolo" Whistler.

With the German surrender and the end of World War II in Europe, Whistler was sent to Osnabrück to take over administration of a large area of Germany of Minden and Munster. He had to look after some 260,000 displaced persons and restore some order. In July Whistler went to England for leave and, in August, Whistler returned to Germany. During lunch with Montgomery, now a field marshal, Whistler learned that the 3rd Division, with a slight change in composition, was to return to England where, in October, it would go to the United States to become part of the Commonwealth Corps in anticipation of the invasion of mainland Japan, but the division would be without Whistler, who would exchange commands with Major General Richard Hull, GOC of the 5th Infantry Division. However, the surrender of Japan just days later cancelled all this.

Whistler was made a Companion of the Order of the Bath in March 1945, and mentioned in despatches in August 1945 and April 1946 for his services during the campaign. In June 1945, he was promoted to colonel (war-substantive) with the temporary rank of major general.

== After the Second World War ==
=== Imperial Strategic Reserve ===
As he had not attended the Staff College, Whistler was not qualified for high positions in the War Office. However, his outstanding success as a leader of troops during the war led him to a succession of increasingly senior command positions after the war, particularly in the challenging environment of decolonisation. The 3rd Infantry Division became the Imperial Strategic Reserve, on five days notice to fly to any part of the world. Whistler took the division to Egypt in November 1945 and was sent almost immediately to northern Palestine to police troubles between Israelis and Arabs during the Palestine Emergency. In December he became GOC British Troops in Egypt and shortly after ceased to be a member of the 3rd Division. His major general rank was made substantive in February 1947, with seniority backdated to April 1946.

=== Decolonisation ===
In January 1947 Montgomery selected Whistler to become General Officer Commanding British Troops in India. There was considerable communal violence prior to independence that required careful policing, but Whistler's main concern was the extraction of British units stationed in India. After final meetings with Lord Mountbatten and Jawaharlal Nehru, and a parade at the Gateway of India, Whistler left Bombay with the last British unit, the 1st Battalion, Somerset Light Infantry, on 28 February 1948.

Whistler's next appointment on 1 June 1948 was Commander-in-Chief (C-in-C) in the Sudan, which also gave him the title of Kaid Sudan Defence Force. He was also amused to find himself on the governing body of the country (the Governor General's Council), and also Minister of Defence answerable to the Legislative Assembly. He worked on Sudanising the Defence Force and within a year felt he had achieved what he had set out to do. In January 1950 he was appointed District Officer Commanding, Northumbrian District and GOC 50th (Northumbrian) Infantry Division, a TA formation, to take effect in June 1950, and he left Sudan on 9 May. His period of command was very short as on 5 January 1951 he was told he was to be appointed General Officer Commanding-in-Chief (GOC-in-C) West Africa Command, to take effect on 10 May 1951. He was also promoted to lieutenant general from that date.

Whistler's headquarters were at Accra, where he commanded the troops in Nigeria, Sierra Leone, Gold Coast and Gambia. As these countries were heading towards independence, Whistler's main concern was the Africanisation of the armed forces. He was knighted as a Knight Commander of the Order of the British Empire in the New Year Honours in 1952. Sir John Macpherson, the Governor-General of Nigeria, warned Whistler of the resistance to his speed of change, receiving the reply, "Well I'm old enough and ugly enough to look after them. And I want to get rid of British NCOs at once and hurry up with the commissioned officers." Young African soldiers were sent to Sandhurst and other colleges and Macpherson noted that one of his second lieutenants was John Ironsi. In September 1953 Whistler was offered Western Command in England from December 1953.

=== Western Command ===
On 1 December 1953, Whistler became the Colonel of the Royal Sussex Regiment (a ceremonial title) and also became GOC-in-C, Western Command. His main interests were to build rapport with the civil authorities, bolster the TA and encourage recruitment and training of officers in Wales and its bordering west Midland and the north-west counties of England. In 1954 he was ear-marked as Army Commander designate in the event of an east–west war in continental Europe and in this role he played a leading part in the training exercise "Battle-Royal". He was made a Knight Commander of the Order of the Bath in the New Years Honours of 1955, and was promoted to full general in July of that year. He held the post of GOC Western Command until his retirement from the army in February 1957, following his promotion to Knight Grand Cross of the Order of the Bath the previous month. Lord Mancroft recalled visiting Whistler at Chester and being amazed at his intricate knowledge of the Roman camp layout. He recalled a dinner later, "Bolo got a fishbone stuck in his throat during dinner and went outside to clear the matter up. Nobody had told him that the regimental goat had been temporarily parked in the gentlemen's cloakroom pending its later ceremonial arrival, and Bolo returned quite shaken and very angry, having had the best of three rounds with the goat, and, I think, lost them all. As he said in his speech, nobody wants to fight a goat in a mess dress and spurs, even when you haven't got a fishbone stuck in your throat."

== Retirement ==
In April 1957, just before Whistler's retirement, Field Marshal Sir Gerald Templer asked him to become Chairman of the Committee on the Reorganisation of British Infantry. Other members of the Committee included Lieutenant General Sir James Cassels. When this work was completed, Templer sent for him in January 1958 to chair another committee, "to investigate and report on all aspects of discipline, training and economy in units." Whistler introduced his report with a Latin quotation attributed to Horace but in fact of his own composition.

Whistler was appointed Deputy lieutenant for the County of Sussex in 1957.

In 1958 Whistler was appointed Colonel Commandant of the Royal West African Frontier Force, being the last British officer to hold the post as it ceased to exist on 1 August 1960. In 1959, the governments of Nigeria and Sierra Leone also invited him to become Honorary Colonel of the Royal Nigerian Military Forces, and the Royal Sierra Leone Military Forces. Whistler was on very friendly terms with Kwame Nkrumah of Ghana, who sought his advice and judgement. Whistler was very concerned about the future of the Nigerian Army because it was split with the officers coming from the south of the country and the soldiers from the north.

Whistler's interest and ability in shooting led him to take an interest in small-bore rifle shooting. He became Vice-President of the National Smallbore Rifle Association in 1958 and chairman in 1959. He was also vice president of the National Rifle Association as well as the Sussex S.B.R.A. and he also managed the NRA overseas teams. He led the British team which competed in the World Championships in Moscow, winning titles in the small-bore prone 40 shots. He took great interest in the Chichester Rifle Club, opening its new range in 1961 and presented it with some of his medals. The Whistler Inter club trophy in his memory is still shot annually on the first Friday of April.

Whistler was elected to the Council of the Army Cadet Force Association on 21 October 1959 as the representative of the NSRA. He was elected Chairman of the ACFA on 18 October 1961.

Whistler's last battle was against lung cancer, an illness which he concealed until November 1962. He died eight months later, aged 64, at the Cambridge Military Hospital, Aldershot, on 4 July.

== Personal life ==
Brigadier Sir John Smyth, a distinguished soldier, wrote Whistler's biography "as a study in leadership" and noted four traits in his character: his humility, his humanity, his sense of humour and his devotion to his family. He summarised his breadth of character: "Bolo Whistler was a very human man; he drank and he smoked and he loved a party and he often used very strong language. But at the same time he was a man of very high ideals and Christian principles. In these matters he set a wonderful example. Often before a battle he would ask his padres to hold a short service, perhaps in a cornfield or any other convenient place."

Whistler married Esmé Keighley, the sister of a naval officer who died as the result of the Russian campaign. The wedding took place at Eastbourne in 1926, and the reception was held at his old school St Cyprians, one of the ushers being then naval cadet Rupert Lonsdale. Whistler and his wife had two daughters.

The Duke of Norfolk who was Whistler's subordinate in the 4th Battalion, Royal Sussex Regiment, and later his superior as Lord Lieutenant of Sussex said of him: "He was possibly the greatest man I ever knew."

Kwame Nkrumah wrote "General Whistler was not only a great soldier, but a great man; he was to me a most sincere friend, frank and understanding, jovial and abounding in energy".

In 1946 Whistler became the patron of Overloon War Museum in the Dutch village of Overloon, that was liberated by Whistler's 3rd Infantry Division in October 1944. The museum is the oldest World War 2-themed museum in Western Europe.

== Publications ==
- Small Bore Rifle Shooting

== Bibliography ==
- Mead, Richard (2007). Churchill's Lions: A biographical guide to the key British generals of World War II. Stroud (UK): Spellmount. pp. 544 pages. ISBN 978-1-86227-431-0.
- Smart, Nick (2005). Biographical Dictionary of British Generals of the Second World War. Barnesley: Pen & Sword. ISBN 1844150496.
- Smyth, Sir John (1967). Bolo Whistler: the life of General Sir Lashmer Whistler: a study in leadership. London: Muller. OCLC 59031387.
- The Times Obituary – Gen. Sir Lashmer Whistler Saturday 6 July 1963

Military offices
Preceded by Thomas Rennie	GOC 3rd Infantry Division; 1944–1947	Succeeded by John Churcher
Preceded by Charles Loewen	GOC 50th (Northumbrian) Infantry Division; 1950–1951	Succeeded by Horatius Murray
Preceded by Sir Cameron Nicholson	GOC-in-C West Africa Command; 1951–1953	Succeeded by Sir Otway Herbert
Preceded by Sir Charles Loewen	GOC-in-C Western Command; 1953–1957	Succeeded by Sir Otway Herbert
Honorary titles
Preceded by Thomas Foster	Colonel of the Royal Sussex Regiment; 1953–1963	Succeeded by John Ashworth
