= Ivor Hughes =

British army general and Serjeant-at-Arms (1897–1962)

Major-General Sir Ivor Hughes KCVO CB CBE DSO MC DL
- Born: 21 December 1897; St Leonards-on-Sea, Sussex, England
- Died: 16 August 1962 (aged 64); Surrey, England
- Military career
- Allegiance: United Kingdom
- Branch: British Army
- Service years: 1916–1935; 1937–1947
- Rank: Major-General
- Service number: 15168
- Unit: Queen's (Royal West Surrey Regiment)
- Commands: XXV Corps; 44th (Home Counties) Infantry Division; 131st Infantry Brigade; 219th Independent Infantry Brigade (Home); 1/6th Battalion, Queen's Royal Regiment; 63rd (Queen's) Searchlight Regiment, Royal Artillery; 4th Battalion, Queen's Royal Regiment (West Surrey)
- Conflicts: First World War; North-West Frontier; Second World War
- Awards: Knight Commander of the Royal Victorian Order; Companion of the Order of the Bath; Commander of the Order of the British Empire; Distinguished Service Order; Military Cross; Mentioned in Despatches (3); War Cross, 1st Class (Greece)
- Other work: Serjeant-at-Arms of the House of Commons

Major-General Sir Ivor Thomas Percival Hughes, KCVO, CB, CBE, DSO, MC, DL (21 December 1897 – 16 August 1962) was a senior British Army officer who fought in both the world wars. During the Second World War he commanded the 44th (Home Counties) Division during the Battle of Alam el Halfa and the Second Battle of El Alamein in late 1942 and later became Serjeant-at-Arms of the House of Commons.

== Early life and military career ==
Ivor Hughes was born in Sussex, England, on 21 December 1897, the son of Revt. F. G. Hughes and was educated at Wellington College, Berkshire. He joined the British Army during the First World War and, after entering the Royal Military College, Sandhurst, graduated on 16 August 1916, being commissioned as a second lieutenant into the Queen's (Royal West Surrey Regiment). Soon afterwards he was sent to the Western Front, where he joined the 1st Battalion of his regiment, then serving in the 100th Brigade of the 33rd Division, later transferring to the 19th Brigade. He was to remain with the battalion for the rest of the war. During his service in Belgium and France he was, in addition to being twice wounded, mentioned in despatches and awarded the Military Cross (MC). The citation for his MC reads:

For conspicuous gallantry and devotion to duty. After his company commander had been wounded, he led the company with great determination and pluck until severely wounded, and was responsible for several enemy attacks being repulsed with considerable enemy loss. Throughout he set a fine example to his men.

== Between the wars ==
Remaining in the army during the interwar period, Hughes was posted to the 2nd Battalion, Queen's in 1919 and, by now a lieutenant, went with the battalion to India, where he became the battalion's assistant adjutant. During his time serving on the North-West Frontier he was mentioned in despatches and awarded the Indian General Service Medal. Hughes was appointed as adjutant to the battalion in 1925 and returned with the battalion to England in 1927. Hughes, by now a captain, then attended the Staff College, Camberley from 1929 to 1930, where his fellow students included numerous future general officers, such as Neil Ritchie, Herbert Lumsden and George Erskine, Reginald Denning, Hugh Stable, Kenneth Crawford, Temple Gurdon, Neil McMicking, I. S. O. Playfair, Harold Redman, James Elliott, and Harold Freeman-Attwood.

After returning to his regiment, this time with the 2nd Battalion, for a year, he was posted to Scottish Command as a staff officer, from 1932 to 1934, later being sent to Dover, Kent as a brigade major to the 12th Brigade until 1935. He then left the army and became Assistant Serjeant-at-Arms of the House of Commons from 1935 to 1939. In 1937 he became second-in-command (2IC) of the 4th Battalion, Queen's, a Territorial Army (TA) unit, and in 1938 commanded the battalion, later overseeing its conversion to a searchlight regiment of the Royal Artillery, whereupon it was redesignated 63rd (Queen's) Searchlight Regiment, Royal Artillery. However, his duties at Westminster forced him to relinquish command in early 1939.

== Second World War ==
Hughes rejoined the army in November 1939, two months after the Second World War began, and soon became Commanding officer (CO) of the 1/6th Battalion, Queen's, another TA unit, then serving as part of the 131st Infantry Brigade of the 44th (Home Counties) Infantry Division, then commanded by Major General Edmund Osborne. After several months of training in Dorset, the battalion was sent overseas to France, arriving there in early April 1940 where it became part of the British Expeditionary Force (BEF). Only a few weeks later the German Army launched its attack in the West, and the battalion moved up to the River Escaut and was ordered to hold the line there. The Germans attacked in force and Hughes' battalion met them and were, for 36 hours, engaged in severe fighting, which resulted in the Germans breaking through on the battalion's flanks, forcing Hughes to order his battalion to retreat to avoid complete encirclement. The greatly depleted battalion eventually, along with most of the rest of the BEF, made their way back to Dunkirk, and were subsequently evacuated to England. Hughes, for his leadership of the battalion in France, was awarded the Distinguished Service Order (DSO).

Soon afterwards the battalion, along with the rest of the brigade and the division, now commanded by Major General Arthur Percival, reorganised in Oxford, later being sent to Lincolnshire, and began anti-invasion duties in the event of a German invasion. Hughes, in late October, was promoted to brigadier and given command of the 219th Independent Infantry Brigade (Home), one of the many newly raised units composed almost entirely of conscripts, most of whom were civilians with little to no previous military experience, created specifically for static beach defence. The brigade, woefully short of basic weaponry, served in Kent under various divisions. Hughes remained with the brigade until early May 1941 when he returned to the 44th Division, then commanded by Major General Noel Mason-MacFarlane (but replaced in late June by Major General Brian Horrocks) and serving in Kent, this time to command the 131st Brigade, fulfilling much the same role as the 219th Brigade had, that of beach defence. Hughes remained with the brigade until mid-March 1942 when he was promoted to major general and became General Officer Commanding (GOC) of the 44th Division, succeeding Major General Horrocks, who received another appointment to become GOC of the 9th Armoured Division. Horrocks later wrote in his autobiography that he, "hated having to leave this [44th] division, which I had been training for nine months, though it was some consolation to know that I was to be succeeded by Ivor Hughes, a 'Queensman' himself, who had been commanding the 131st Queens Brigade. He was the perfect choice, and he would, I knew, be very popular."

The 44th Division – comprising the 131st, 132nd, 133rd Infantry Brigades and supporting divisional troops – was serving in Kent as part of Lieutenant General James Gammell's XII Corps, part of South-Eastern Command under Lieutenant General Bernard Montgomery, and, soon after Hughes took command, was ordered to prepare for overseas service. The division, destined for North Africa, moved to Glasgow, Scotland, in late May and, after being at sea for almost two months, finally arrived in Egypt in late July and, moving some 60 miles east of Cairo, commenced training for desert warfare.

However, in mid-August, the division was ordered by General Sir Harold Alexander, the newly appointed Commander-in-chief (C-in-C) Middle East Command, to join the British Eighth Army at El Alamein. Lieutenant General Bernard Montgomery, the new GOC Eighth Army, who knew the division well after having it under his command in England, had specifically requested that the 44th Division be sent forward. Arriving on 15 August, the division was assigned to XIII Corps, under Lieutenant General Brian Horrocks, Hughes' predecessor as GOC of the 44th Division, and began relieving elements of the 5th Indian Infantry Division on the Alam Halfa Ridge, and the 132nd Brigade was temporarily detached to Lieutenant General Bernard Freyberg's 2nd New Zealand Division. The division's first engagement came over two weeks later, during the Battle of Alam el Halfa, which saw the detached 132nd Brigade under Brigadier Lashmer "Bolo" Whistler, taking part in Operation Beresford, suffer almost 700 casualties, with the rest of the division's losses being relatively light.

Soon afterwards the much depleted 132nd Brigade returned to command of the division, bringing it up to full strength of three brigades again, only for the 133rd Brigade to be transferred to Major General "Alec" Gatehouse's 10th Armoured Division, again reducing Hughes' division to just two brigades. Towards the end of September, the 131st Brigade suffered heavily in Operation Braganza and, in late October the division, still with just two brigades, fought in the Second Battle of El Alamein and, still under Lieutenant General Horrocks's XIII Corps, played a relatively minor role as a result. Hughes' division was further weakened when he lost the 131st Brigade in early November to the 7th Armoured Division, under Major General John Harding. Although trying to retain his division, the 44th was disbanded soon after (officially on 31 January 1943), due to a shortage of infantry in North Africa and the Middle East, and most of the division's units were posted to other divisions, the 131st Brigade remaining with the 7th Armoured Division for the rest of the war, the 132nd Brigade being broken up, its battalions posted away to Indian Army units, and the 133rd Brigade also being broken up.

In the aftermath of his division's disbandment, Hughes was promoted to the acting rank of lieutenant general and became GOC of XXV Corps, then comprising only the 8th Indian Infantry Division, in Cyprus. He was then, from 1944 to 1945, a member of the Military Liaison Mission to Greece, Yugoslavia, and Albania, and retired from the army, with the honorary rank of major general, in 1945.

== Postwar ==
After retirement from the army, Hughes returned to his duties at Westminster which the war had forced him to abandon, and became Chairman of the Surrey Territorial and Auxiliary Forces Association from 1947 to 1949 before becoming Deputy Lieutenant of Surrey. From 1957 until his sudden death on 16 August 1962 – exactly 46 years since he received his commission – he was Serjeant-at-Arms of the House of Commons.

== Bibliography ==
- Smart, Nick (2005). Biographical Dictionary of British Generals of the Second World War. Barnesley: Pen & Sword. ISBN 1844150496.
- Horrocks, Sir Brian (1960). A Full Life. Barnsley: Leo Cooper. ISBN 0-85052-144-0.

Military offices
| Preceded by Brian Horrocks | GOC 44th (Home Counties) Infantry Division; 1942–1943 | Succeeded by Division disbanded |
| Preceded by Alan Bruce Blaxland | GOC XXV Corps; 1943 | Succeeded by Corps disbanded |
Government offices
| Preceded by Sir Charles Howard | Serjeant-at-Arms of the House of Commons; 1957–1962 | Succeeded by Sir Alexander Gordon-Lennox |
