= 208th (Sussex) Field Company, Royal Engineers =

208th (Sussex) Field Company, RE
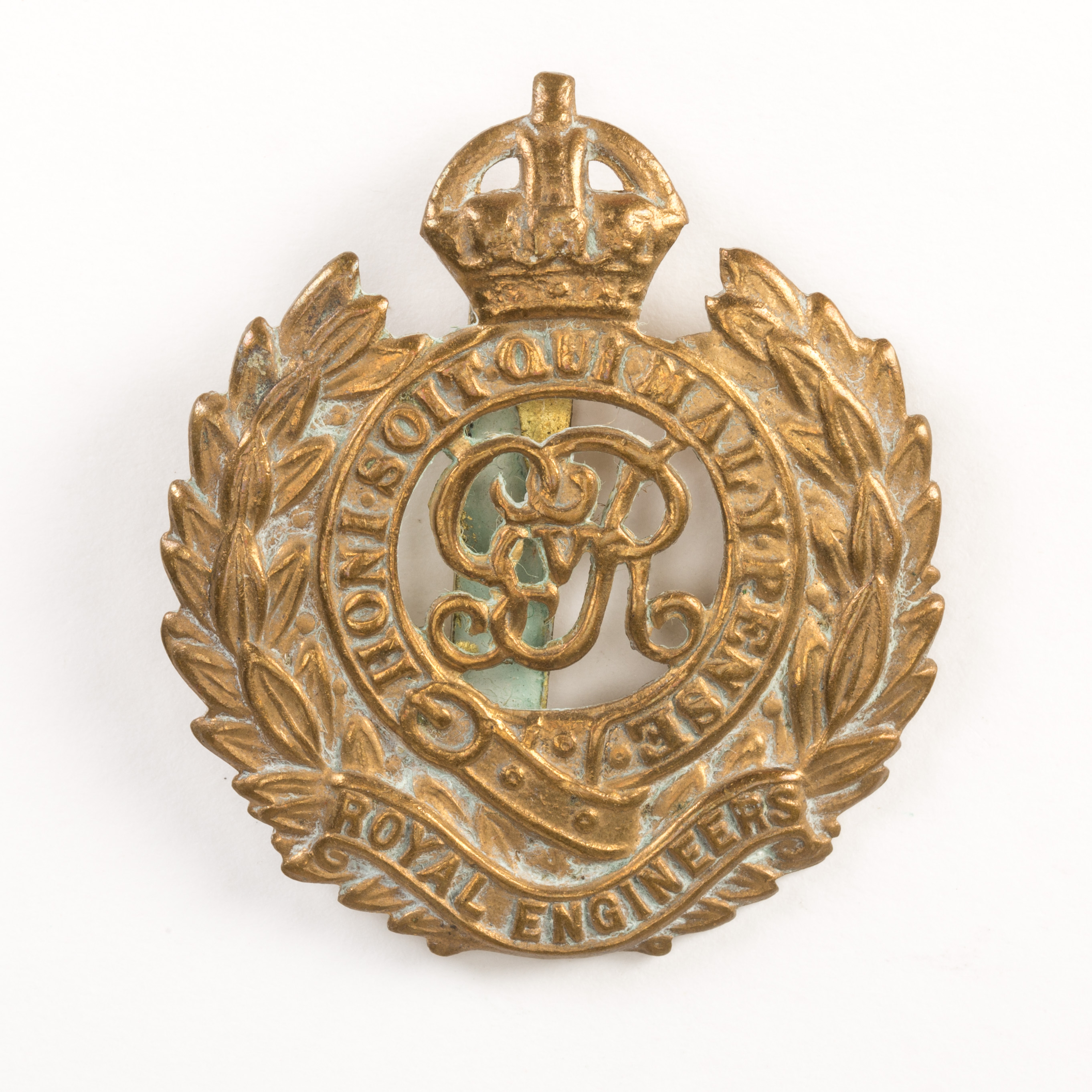
- RE Cap badge (King George V cipher)
- Active: 1920–1961
- Country: United Kingdom
- Branch: Territorial Army
- Role: Field engineers
- Part of: 44th (Home Counties) Division; 2nd Division
- Garrison/HQ: Eastbourne
- Engagements: Battle of France; Dunkirk evacuation Battle of Kohima; Irrawaddy crossing

The 208th (Sussex) Field Company was a Territorial Army (TA) unit of Britain's Royal Engineers (RE) raised in Eastbourne in 1920. It formed part of 44th (Home Counties) Division, but shortly after the outbreak of war in 1939 it joined 2nd Division of the Regular Army and served with that formation throughout the Second World War. It was in the Battle of France and the Dunkirk evacuation. Later it was sent to Burma where it was involved in the decisive Battle of Kohima and the assault crossing of the Irrawaddy. The unit was reformed in the postwar TA and continued until 1967.

== Origin ==
The 1st Sussex Engineer Volunteer Corps was raised at Eastbourne in 1890 and by 1901 had expanded to 11 companies across Sussex and Kent. When the Volunteers were subsumed into the new Territorial Force (TF) in 1908, part of the 1st Sussex EVC provided the divisional engineers for the TF's Home Counties Division, with two field companies based at Eastbourne and Hastings.

On the outbreak of the First World War in 1914, the bulk of the Home Counties Division was sent to garrison India and it never operated as a formation during the war. However, its engineers remained in the UK and later joined Regular Army divisions fighting on the Western Front: 1st HC Field Co with 8th Division and 2nd HC Fd Co with 5th Division.

The companies remained with these formations for the rest of the war. 1st Home Counties Fd Co (later designated 490th Fd Co) with 8th Division saw action Aubers Ridge, the Somme, Ypres, the German spring offensive and the Allied Hundred Days Offensive. 2nd Home Counties Fd Co (later 491 Fd Co) was with 5th Division at Hill 60, the Somme and Ypres; it then moved to the Italian Front, but was back on the Western Front for the battles of 1918. The companies' 2nd Line duplicates formed during the war remained in the UK and did not see any active service.

44th (Home Counties) Division reformed in 1920 and when the TF was reconstituted as the Territorial Army (TA) in 1921, the field companies were renumbered. The recruiting areas of the former 1st and 2nd Home Counties Field Companies were combined to form 208 (Sussex) Field Company, with company HQ at Ordnance Yard, Eastbourne, a drill station at Rock-a-Nore, Hastings, and also recruiting at Bexhill-on-Sea.

== Second World War ==
=== Mobilisation ===
Shortly before the outbreak of the Second World War, the TA was doubled in size and 44th (Home Counties) Division formed a duplicate, 12th (Eastern) Infantry Division, with its RE based at Hastings. 208 (Sussex) Fd Co formed two of the additional companies from men recruited at Hastings: 262 Fd Co and 265 Fd Park Co. 44th (Home Counties) Division was mobilised on 3 September 1939 and 12th (E) Division became active on 7 October 1939.

Shortly after mobilisation, 44th (Home Counties) Division formed the 'Ashdown Forest Mobile Group' as an anti-invasion reserve at Groombridge, with 208 Fd Co as its RE component, joining on 14 September. On 29 September it was announced that each of the 1st Line TA divisions would send one field company to France to build defences for the new British Expeditionary Force (BEF). 208 (S) Field Co was selected from 44th (Home Counties) Division and made its way from Groombridge to Southampton, where it boarded the Mona's Queen on 26 September and landed at Cherbourg the following day.

=== Battle of France ===
2nd Division's formation sign.

After arrival in France, 208 (Sussex) Fd Co worked in the area of Douai and Lille as part of Force X, building defences for the BEF along the France/Belgium frontier, and airfields and HQs for the Royal Air Force. It briefly rejoined 44th (Home Counties) Division when that formation arrived in France on 1 May. As the training of the recently doubled TA formations was still weak, GHQ instituted a policy of exchanging some of their units with Regular formations. Having already been detached during the training period, the CRE selected 208 Fd Co as the one to be exchanged, and it moved to 5 Brigade Group in 2nd Division on 4 May.

When the German offensive in the west opened on 10 May, the BEF advanced into Belgium in accordance with 'Plan D'. By 12 May 208 Fd Co was deployed on the Dyle Line with the tasks of preparing bridges over the rivers Lasgne, Train and Heze for demolition, creating as much of an anti-tank obstacle as possible, and assisting the rest of 2nd Divisional RE and Belgian and French engineers in preparing to blow the Dyle bridges. This work was completed on 15 May, which was the day that the BEF came under attack. 208 Field Co was ordered to blow its bridges and begin its withdrawal that night as the BEF fell back to the Lasgne.

Next day the company came under shell fire and by 17 May was on the River Senne, the first stage of its retreat to the Escaut. After blowing its last bridge on the Senne the company was without orders, so made its way back through traffic jams to the River Dendre. The whole of 2nd Division was back on the Escaut by 18 May, though this river was not much of a defensive obstacle, and the division came under heavy attack on 21 May. 208 Field Co spent 20–22 May putting houses astride the road at Taintignies into a state of defence and laying a minefield at Rumes. However, the BEF had to withdraw from the Escaut to the 'Canal Line', and 208 Fd Co was ordered to strip the detonators from the mines so that friendly troops could retreat through them. The company was ordered back on 23 May and passed through the burning town of La Bassée the following day. Operating with 6 Bde on 25 May the company attempted to destroy bridges over the La Bassée Canal near Merville and repair a vital bridge at St Venant, while confused fighting was going on nearby and several casualties were suffered from shellfire. 6 Brigade having been forced back, 2nd Division counter-attacked on 26 May to try to regain the Canal Line to cover the start of the BEF's withdrawal to Dunkirk.

There was confused fighting throughout 27 May, with parties of 208 Fd Co separated, some in the fighting line, others as demolition parties manning 'last minute' bridges at St Venant and Merville. Most of the unit's transport was disabled and had to be abandoned. By now 2nd Division had little fighting strength left and was itself withdrawn to the Dunkirk bridgehead on night of 28/29 May, moving with difficulty on the congested roads. A party of volunteers from 208 Fd Co remained at the De Moers Canal to blow the bridges while the remainder of the company entered Dunkirk, destroyed their remaining vehicles and waited on the Mole for their place in the evacuation. They boarded the drifter Fisher Boy of Grimsby and landed at Ramsgate at 00.30 on 31 May, while their Officer Commanding, Maj L.F. Morling, remained for a few hours as Mole Master. He and the men who had been separated got away with other parties. Eight men of 'last minute' demolition parties were left behind.

=== Home Defence ===
The remnants of 2nd Division reformed around Halifax, West Yorkshire, from 1 June, with the men of 208 Fd Co arriving from depots scattered all over the country. The company was reinforced and began to re-equip for redeployment in France, but the French surrender ended those plans. Instead the division was sent to defend the Yorkshire coast, with 208 Fd Co billeted at Hornsea from 23 June. Work on defences began immediately, and continued in Kingston upon Hull from 22 October. During the Hull Blitz the unit suffered some casualties while firefighting on 13/14 March 1941, and its own vehicles were bombed on 18/19 March. In April the unit was moved to Epworth, Lincolnshire, for training in bridgebuilding, and then to Selby in August. In October 1941 the unit was ordered to mobilise for overseas service, and in November the division came under War Office control. Mobilisation and training was continued at Chipping Norton through the winter, and on 11 April 1942 the company embarked at Liverpool aboard the Marnix van Sint Aldegond and sailed in convoy for India on 15 April.

=== India ===
The company disembarked at Bombay on 12 June and went into camp near Kirkee, returning to Bombay in January 1943. 2nd Division's role was to reinforce the central reserve and train to for possible amphibious operations in the recapture of Burma. 208 Field Company was not with 6 Bde from the division which participated in the Arakan Campaign in March 1943, instead it continued amphibious and jungle training at Ahmednagar until March 1944.

=== Kohima ===
In March 1944 the Japanese launched a pre-emptive attack (the U Go Offensive) against Kohima and Imphal, and 2nd Division was among the reinforcements rushed to the Central Front. Between 25 and 28 March the company set off from Ahmednagar by road and rail to Dimapur where 2nd Division was to concentrate. By the time 5 Bde Group arrived, IV Corps had completed its withdrawal to defensive positions in the Imphal Plain. The brigade's orders were to break through to relieve the garrison of Kohima, and on 11 April two companies of 7th Battalion Worcestershire Regiment and No 2 Section of 208 Fd Co led the way to reconnoitre the route. The sappers' first task was to repair broken bridges. On the night of 13/14 April infiltrating Japanese troops bumped into 208's sentries and there was a sharp hand-to-hand action. The Worcesters and tanks then drove off the attackers; later 208's sappers had the gruesome job of removing booby-traps from Japanese bodies. They continued to improve the track and bridges, and to prepare gun positions, and on 18 April 2nd Division broke through to relieve the defenders of Kohima.

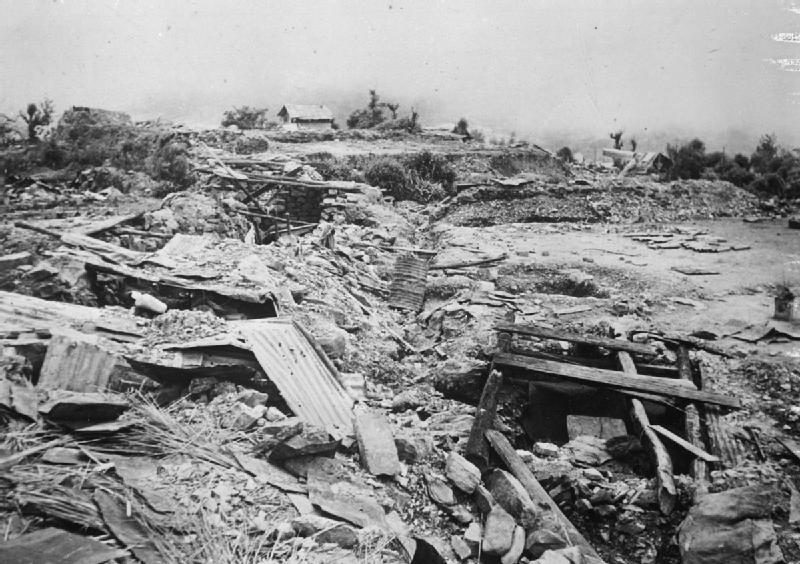
The ruins of Naga Village after the fighting.

2nd Division's next task was to clear the Japanese from Kohima Ridge. The divisional RE failed in several attempts to bulldoze a route up to 'IGH Spur' overlooking the District Commissioner's Bungalow (scene of hard fighting during the siege), but 208 Fd Co cut a mule track for supplies. 5 Brigade then attacked towards Naga Village on the evening of 25 April in heavy rain, with 208's sappers cutting tracks and guiding supplies and stretcher-parties along them. The action continued for days; on 3 May the tired Worcesters were relieved from defending the perimeter of the brigade 'box' by sappers of 208, similarly they relieved 1/8th Bn Lancashire Fusiliers (4 Bde) on 15 May. On 10 May the sappers made a new track to get a dismantled 6-pounder anti-tank gun up to the ridge to deal with Japanese bunkers at close range. On 16 and 17 May the sappers winched tanks up to the ridge by bulldozer, and 208 Fd Co also sent out parties with pole charges to destroy bunkers. By 24 May the reinforced 2nd Division had succeeded in driving the Japanese off Kohima Ridge and 5 Bde was relieved.

208 Field Co was now set to work building headquarters and hospitals, gun pits for 5.5-inch guns and jeep tracks. As Fourteenth Army's pursuit gained momentum, the company's role became clearing roadblocks and building or repairing Bailey, Hamilton and SBG bridges in Monsoon rain. On 20 July 2nd Division's advanced guard reached Imphal and the siege was ended shortly afterwards. 2nd Division and its sappers then took over protection and maintenance of the Kohima–Imphal road until the end of the month. Although most of 2nd Division was withdrawn for rest, 208 Fd Co continued working through August, first under 23rd Indian Division and then 11th (East Africa) Division, on water supply and Folding Boat Equipment (FBE) bridges. On 23 August the company reverted to 2nd Division and joined it in rest camp.

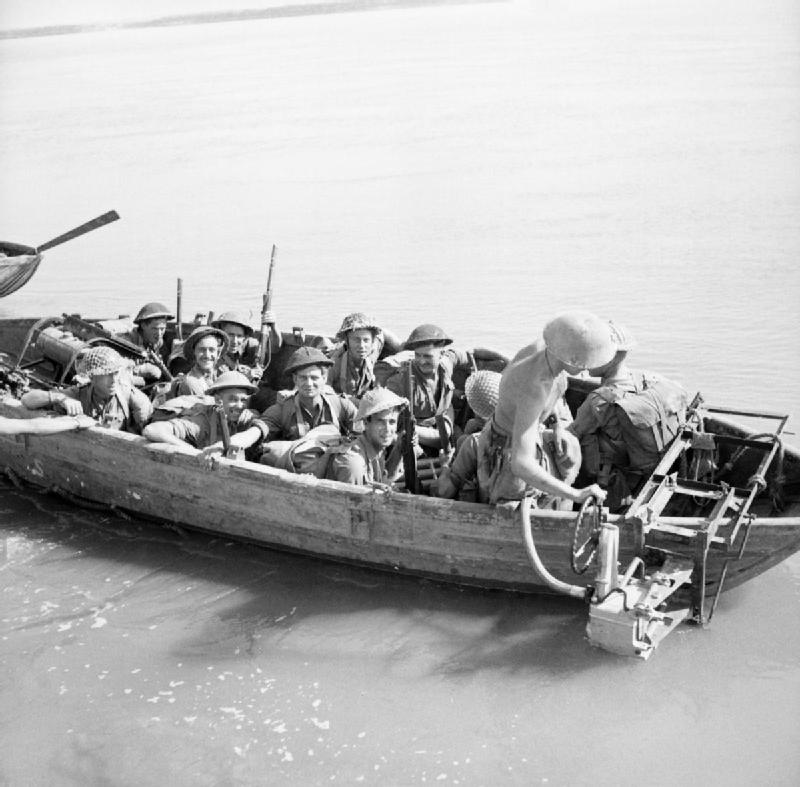
The Dorsets cross the Irrawaddy by assault boat, 26 February 1945.

=== Irrawaddy crossing ===
Operations resumed in November, and 208 Fd Co moved up to take over the Kelewa–Shwegu ferry service. There was an FBE bridge over the Mittya River and a Bailey over the Chindwin River, but the approaches to both were so bad that a vehicle ferry had been established using rafts. The company operated this service until the end of December, after which it worked on repairing airfields, bridges, roads and water points behind the advancing Fourteenth Army. In mid-February it began reconnoitring the intended crossing point on the Irrawaddy River

2nd Division was ordered to cross the Irrawaddy River on 24 February using assault boats, 'Ranger' rubber dinghies and FBE boats manned by 208 Fd Co, while 5 Fd Co operated DUKWs. The assault boats were old and had to be carried a long way to the water's edge by the infantry, so several were damaged. Once on the water they came under heavy fire from the opposite bank in the bright moonlight. The right crossing by No 3 Platoon with the Worcesters had to be abandoned; No 1 Platoon got the first wave of 1st Bn Cameron Highlanders across at the central crossing, but the sappers were unable to take the boats back for a second wave. The left hand crossing by No 2 Platoon and 1st Bn Royal Welch Fusiliers was to an island from which covering fire could be given; this was successful. The company then collected and repaired as many boats as possible for a second crossing attempt in daylight. The follow-up battalion, the 2nd Bn Dorsetshire Regiment was switched to cross through the Camerons' bridgehead rather than the Worcesters' as planned. Once enough infantry were across it was possible to operate FBE rafts. The sappers used 'Beehive' charges to blow gaps in the river bank, and then ferried across a bulldozer on a Bailey raft. This cleared the exits and a ferry service was quickly organised. By the evening of 27 February the majority of the division and its vehicles were across the river.

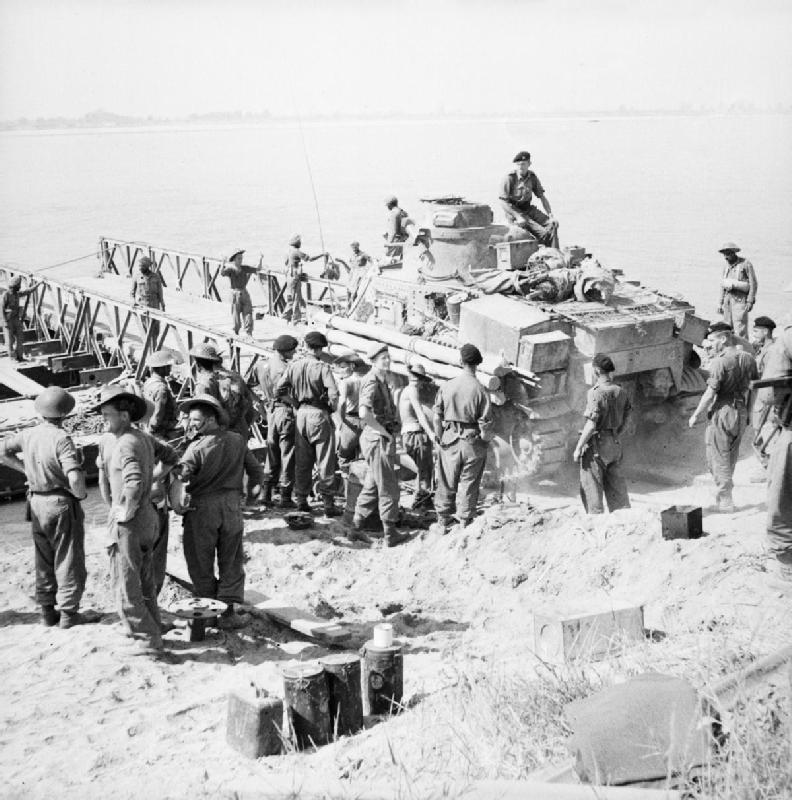
2nd Division Loading an M3 Lee tank onto a Bailey pontoon raft to cross the Irrawaddy, 28 February 1945.

During March 2 Division advanced steadily, with the sappers clearing mines and building a 160 feet (49 m) FBE bridge across the Myitnge river, until Ava was reached. Here the company set up rafts across the Irrawaddy, and then built a floating Bailey bridge across the Myittha River. Fourteenth Army captured Mandalay on 20 March and prepared to move on Rangoon before the Monsoon broke, but 2nd Division was not included in the planning. Its last operations were against Indian National Army units at Legyi in April, and then clearing the country towards Mount Popa. The division disengaged on 22 April, and its personnel were airlifted out to India, 208 Fd Co arriving in the Calcutta area on 27 April.

Once concentrated at Calcutta, 2nd Division was supposed to be re-equipped and ready for an assault landing at Rangoon (Operation Dracula) by mid-May, but its despatch was delayed and then called off. 208 Field Co was moved into camp at Secunderabad. At the end of June the company began to lose men to the 'Python' scheme of repatriation (men who had been overseas for more than three years and eight months). Shortly afterwards the Japanese surrendered. The original personnel of 208 Fd Co progressively left until the skeleton company was placed in suspended animation on 31 January 1946. Most of the men arrived back at Southampton with 2nd Division.

=== 262 and 265 Field Companies ===
12th (Eastern) Infantry Divisional sign.

On the outbreak of war in September 1939, 262 Fd Co and 265 Fd Park Co separated from 208 Fd Co, and 12th (E) Divisional RE became active on 7 October 1939. After training, 12th (E) Divisional RE sailed to France on 20 April. They were sent to Rouen, where they were put to building camps and 265 Fd Park Co set up an RE depot and workshop. When the German invasion began 12th (E) Division was ordered to concentrate at Amiens. The RE were entrained but never reached Amiens. They were then withdrawn to the Atlantic coast and after the rest of the BEF had been evacuated from Dunkirk the remaining troops were evacuated through Cherbourg Naval Base, 12th (E) Divisional RE arriving at Southampton on 7 June.

12th (E) Division's casualties were so severe that it was broken up on 10 July, when the divisional RE was converted into XII Corps Troops RE. The unit moved around the UK working on defences, laying minefields and supervising civilian contractors digging anti-tank ditches. On one occasion an infantry party wandered into a minefield near Chichester and some were killed and wounded. 262 Field Co was called upon for help and the officer commanding, Maj A.H.M. Morris, led a detachment and personally went into the crater to try to locate displaced mines, then disarmed others so that the casualties could be recovered. Major Morris was awarded the George Medal.

XII Corps' formation sign

For the Normandy landings, XII CTRE's field companies were loaned to the assaulting divisions as obstacle clearance parties. Shortly after 07.45 on 6 June (D Day) 262 Fd Co landed with troops of 3rd Canadian Division on Juno Beach. Once ashore, the sappers began the dangerous task of clearing the beach obstacles before they were covered by the rising tide, and constructing exits so the follow-up troops could quickly get into action. On 8 June 262 Fd Co established company HQ at Bernieres while the platoons continued beach clearance. They reverted to XII CTRE command around 11 June, and spent the rest of the campaign clearing roads of mines and debris, filling craters and minor bridgebuilding. 265 Field Park Co and the rear parties of the field companies joined the unit later. 265 Field Park Co operated quarries for road-building material and prepared bridging equipment for the field companies.

After the breakout from the Normandy beachhead, XII crossed the Seine and advanced towards Antwerp, with its RE maintaining roads and building bridges. During the assault crossing of the Rhine (Operation Plunder), XII CTRE was allotted the task of building a Class 12 pontoon Bailey Bridge (codenamed 'Sussex') at the extreme left of the corps' area. The main bridge was 1,440 feet (440 m) long, with an additional 320 feet (98 m) across a minor gap. The start of construction was held up by enemy fire, but once work began the bridge was completed with the assistance of naval tugs on 26 March in just under 43 hours.

After VE Day XII CTRE was involved in bridgebuilding at Hamburg Docks. It then prepared for service in the Far East but the Japanese surrender ended the war. The unit continued working in the occupied zone of West Germany until its companies were disbanded by 25 March 1946.

== Postwar ==
When the TA was reconstituted in 1947, 44th (Home Counties) Divisional RE was reformed as 119 Field Engineer Regiment, with HQ at Brighton. 208 Field Squadron (as RE companies were now termed) was once again based at Ordnance Yard, Eastbourne, with a detachment at Hatherley Road Drill Hall, Hastings.

In the 1961 reorganisation of the TA, the division became 44th (Home Counties) Division/District and 119 Rgt reverted to being 44th (Home Counties) Divisional RE. 208 Field Sqn was amalgamated with 210 Fd Sqn based at Seaford, with a combined recruiting area covering Hastings, Eastbourne, Seaford, Lewes and Worthing. To avoid argument, both units' numbers were scrapped and the amalgamated squadron revived a World War I number as 490 Field Squadron.

When the TA was reduced into the Territorial and Army Volunteer Reserve (TAVR) on 31 March 1967, the division/district was disbanded and its remaining RE companies absorbed into a new TAVR unit at Eastbourne designated B Company (Royal Engineers), 9th Territorial Battalion, The Queen's Regiment (Royal Sussex), but was disbanded on 31 March 1969.

== Memorials ==
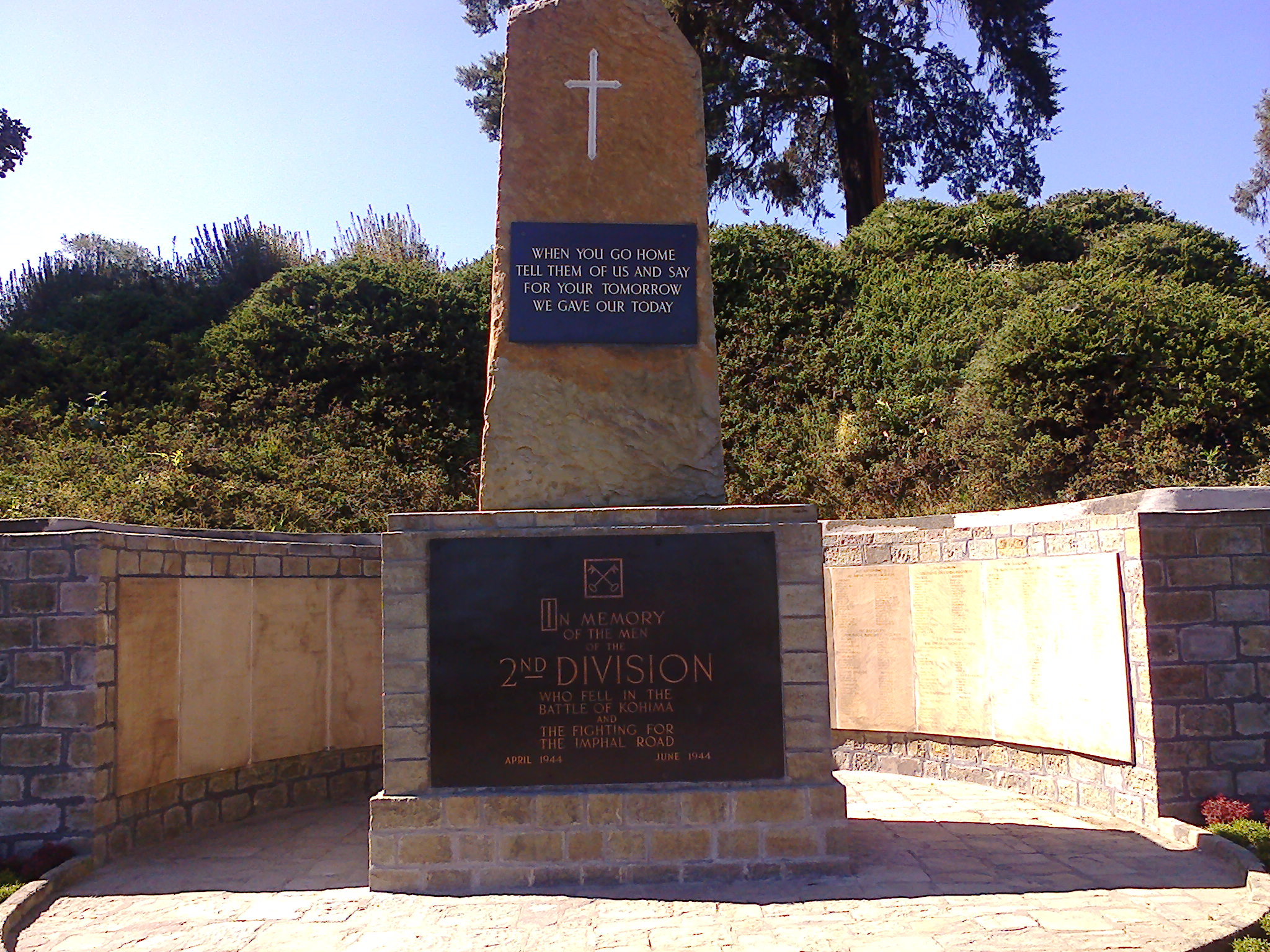
2nd Division's Kohima Memorial.

Men of 208 Fd Co worked on building the Kohima Memorial in October 1944 and October/November 1945. The 2nd Division's memorial carries the now-famous 'Kohima Epitaph':

 'When you go home, tell them of us and say,
 For your tomorrow we gave our today' 

A memorial to the 16 men of 208 Fd Co who died in France and Burma was unveiled in All Souls Church, Susans Road, Eastbourne, on 28 October 1951.

== External sources ==
- British Army units from 1945 on
- Burma Star Association
- The Drill Hall Project
- Imperial War Museum, War Memorials Register
- Orders of Battle at Patriot Files
- Land Forces of Britain, the Empire and Commonwealth – Regiments.org (archive site)
- Graham Watson, The Territorial Army 1947
