= 44th (Home Counties) Division =

Home Counties Division 44th (Home Counties) Division 44th (Home Counties) Infantry Division
- 44th Infantry Division insignia.
- Active: April 1908 – 3 December 1914; February 1920 – 31 January 1943; January 1947 – 1 May 1961
- Country: United Kingdom
- Branch: British Army
- Type: Infantry
- Size: Division
- Peacetime HQ: Hounslow, Middlesex
- Engagements: First World War; Second World War St Omer-La Bassée Alam Halfa Second Battle of El Alamein

Commanders
- Notable commanders: Charles Townshend; Arthur Percival; Sir Brian Horrocks; Sir Hugh Stockwell

The Home Counties Division was an infantry division of the Territorial Force, part of the British Army, that was raised in 1908. As the name suggests, the division recruited in the Home Counties, particularly Kent, Middlesex, Surrey and Sussex.

At the outbreak of the First World War, it accepted liability for overseas service and was posted to India in 1914 to relieve Regular Army units for service on the Western Front. On arrival in India it was effectively broken up, so it did not see active service as a complete formation. However, most of its constituent units did serve in active theatres, notably Mesopotamia from 1915 and in the Third Anglo-Afghan War in 1919.

Reformed in the Territorial Army (TA) in 1920 as the 44th (Home Counties) Division, the division saw active service in the Second World War in Belgium, France and North Africa (notably in the Battle of El Alamein) before again being disbanded in 1943. Once again, its component units continued to serve, in North Africa, Italy, North-West Europe, and Burma.

The division was again reformed in the TA in 1947 before being merged with the Home Counties District in 1961, thus ending its separate existence.

== History ==
=== Formation ===
The Territorial Force (TF) was formed on 1 April 1908 following the enactment of the Territorial and Reserve Forces Act 1907 (7 Edw.7, c.9) which combined and re-organised the old Volunteer Force, the Honourable Artillery Company and the Yeomanry. On formation, the TF contained 14 infantry divisions and 14 mounted yeomanry brigades. One of the divisions was the Home Counties Division.

As the name suggests, the division recruited in the Home Counties, particularly Kent, Middlesex, Surrey and Sussex. It was composed of the Surrey, Middlesex and Kent Infantry Brigades (each of four battalions), four artillery brigades (Note: The basic organic unit of the Royal Artillery was, and is, the Battery. When grouped together they formed brigades, in the same way that infantry battalions or cavalry regiments were grouped together in brigades. At the outbreak of the First World War, a field artillery brigade of headquarters (4 officers, 37 other ranks), three batteries (5 and 193 each), and a brigade ammunition column (4 and 154) had a total strength just under 800 so was broadly comparable to an infantry battalion (just over 1,000) or a cavalry regiment (about 550). Like an infantry battalion, an artillery brigade was usually commanded by a Lieutenant-Colonel. These figures refer to 6-gun batteries; Territorial Force artillery batteries were organised on a 4-gun basis at the outbreak of the war, so strengths would be approximately two thirds of this. Artillery brigades were redesignated as regiments in 1938.) of the Royal Field Artillery recruited in Sussex and Kent, a heavy battery of the Royal Garrison Artillery (also recruited in Kent), plus support units of the Royal Engineers (including the Signal Service), Royal Army Medical Corps and the Army Service Corps. Two Army Troops battalions of the Royal Sussex Regiment were also attached for training, but were not integral to the division. In peacetime, the divisional headquarters was in Hounslow in Middlesex.

=== First World War ===
In accordance with the Territorial and Reserve Forces Act 1907 (7 Edw.7, c.9) which brought the Territorial Force into being, the TF was intended to be a home defence force for service during wartime and members could not be compelled to serve outside the country. However, on the outbreak of war on 4 August 1914, many members volunteered for Imperial Service. Therefore, TF units were split into 1st Line (liable for overseas service) and 2nd Line (home service for those unable or unwilling to serve overseas) units. 2nd Line units performed the home defence role, although in fact most of these were also posted abroad in due course. The Home Counties Division formed the 2nd Home Counties Division in this manner with an identical structure.

The division mobilised on the outbreak of the war. Early in September 1914, the division sent two battalions to Gibraltar to relieve regular battalions; 7th and 8th Middlesex left on 4 and 10 September respectively. On 22 September, India agreed to send 32 British and 20 Indian regular battalions to Europe in exchange for 43 partially trained TF battalions. (Note: The 32 British regular battalions thus relieved formed the bulk of the 27th (10 battalions), 28th (10 battalions), and 29th Divisions (9 battalions, including 3 from Burma) and part of the 8th (3 battalions).) Accordingly, the division accepted liability for service in India. It was joined by the 4th (Cumberland and Westmorland) Battalion, Border Regiment (from Carlisle) and the 4th Battalion, King's (Shropshire Light Infantry) (from Shrewsbury) to replace 7th and 8th Middlesex, and 1/1st Brecknockshire Battalion, South Wales Borderers (from Brecon) as an extra battalion for garrison duties in Aden.

The division sailed from Southampton on 30 October 1914 with 13 infantry battalions and 3 artillery brigades (nine batteries of four 15-pounder BLCs each, but without ammunition columns). The infantry brigade staffs, the IV Home Counties (H) Brigade, RFA, the Home Counties (Kent) Heavy Battery, the engineers, signals, ambulance and train units were all left behind and most were soon posted to other divisions on the Western Front.

The division arrived at Bombay on 1–3 December 1914, with the Brecknockshire Battalion departing again on 9 December for Aden. The divisional commander, Major-General J.C. Young, accompanied the division to India. On arrival, he handed over the units and returned to England, arriving on 22 December. He took command of the 2nd Line 2nd Home Counties Division on 20 January 1915.

The division was effectively broken up on arrival in India in December 1914; the units reverted to peacetime conditions and were dispersed throughout India and Burma. The battalions were posted to Lucknow (2), Cawnpore, Fyzabad, Mhow, Kamptee, Jubbulpore, Jhansi, Dinapore, Fort William, Rangoon and Maymyo and the batteries were posted to Kamptee, Mhow (2), Jullundur, Multan, Ferozepore, and Jubbulpore (3). The battalions and batteries moved around the various garrison stations in India, Burma and Aden from time to time. For example, the 1/4th Buffs (Note: With the formation of the 2nd Line, the original units and formations were designated with the fractional "1/" and the 2nd Line with "2/".) moved from Mhow to Aden in August 1915, to Bareilly in January 1916, and to Multan in July 1918 where it remained until the end of the war. The 1/4th KSLI went further afield; on arrival in India, it was posted to Rangoon, with a detachment in the Andaman Islands. On 6 February 1915 it was dispatched to Singapore to help to suppress a mutiny. In April, part of the battalion went to Hong Kong; the battalion was replaced at Rangoon by the 2/4th Border Regiment. Thereafter, it returned to England via Colombo, Durban and Cape Town before landing at Plymouth on 27 July 1917. Two days later, it left Southampton for France to join 63rd (Royal Naval) Division.

The units pushed on with training to prepare for active service, handicapped by the need to provide experienced manpower for active service units. By early 1916 it had become obvious that it would not be possible to transfer the division to the Western Front as originally intended. Nevertheless, individual units of the division proceeded overseas on active service through the rest of the war. All three artillery brigades went to Mesopotamia in 1916 (III Home Counties) and 1917 (I and II Home Counties) and, likewise, so did 1/5th Queen's, 1/5th Buffs, 1/5th East Surrey, 1/9th Middlesex, 1/5th QORWK infantry battalions. In addition, the 1/4th Queen's, the 1/4th and 2/4th Border, and the 1/4th QORWK took part in the Third Anglo-Afghan War in 1919.

The Territorial Force divisions and brigades were numbered in May 1915 in the order that they departed for overseas service, starting with the 42nd (East Lancashire) Division. The Home Counties Division should have been numbered as the 44th (Home Counties) Division, but as the division had already been broken up, this was merely a place holder. Likewise, the Surrey, Middlesex and Kent Brigades were only notionally numbered as 131st, 132nd and 133rd, respectively. (Note: 44th Division was originally authorised in March 1915 and consisted of 'Kitchener's Army' battalions. It was renumbered 37th Division on 12 April 1915 and the original number, together with the brigade numbers, were later reassigned to the Home Counties Division.)

=== Between the wars ===
In 1919, the remaining units in India were repatriated to England. The Territorial Force was effectively disbanded in 1919, but started to reform from 1 February 1920 as the units commenced recruiting. From 1 October 1921, it was renamed as the Territorial Army (TA). The division was reformed in 1920.

One major change with the new TA had an effect on the number of infantry battalions. The original 14 divisions were reformed with the pre-war standard of three brigades of four battalions each, for a total of 168 battalions. Infantry were no longer to be included as Army Troops or part of the Coastal Defence Forces so the pre-war total of 208 battalions had to be reduced by 40. This was achieved by either converting certain battalions to other roles, usually artillery or engineers, or by amalgamating pairs of battalions within a regiment. The 44th (Home Counties) Division illustrated both of these processes: the 10th Battalion, Middlesex Regiment was converted to the Home Counties Divisional Signals, RCS in 1921 and the 4th and 5th (The Weald of Kent) Battalions, Buffs were amalgamated as the 4th/5th Battalion in the same year. In this way, the division was able to incorporate two Army Troops battalions of the Royal Sussex Regiment.

The divisional artillery was reformed with three brigades: 1st Home Counties with 1–4 Sussex Batteries, 2nd Home Counties with 5–8 Sussex Batteries, and 3rd Home Counties with 1–4 Kent Batteries. These were renumbered in 1921 as the 57th (Home Counties), 58th (Home Counties) and 59th (Home Counties) Brigades, later 57th (Home Counties), 58th (Sussex) and 59th (Home Counties)(Cinque Ports) Brigades.

The division underwent a number of changes in the late 1930s. In 1936, it was decided to concentrate Vickers machine guns in specialised machine gun battalions. Rather than resurrecting the Machine Gun Corps, a number of line infantry regiments were converted instead; the Middlesex Regiment was one of four regiments selected for conversion. (Note: The other three regiments selected for conversions to machine gun battalions were the Royal Northumberland Fusiliers, Cheshire Regiment and the Manchester Regiment.) The 7th and 8th Battalions were converted at the same time. They were replaced by the 22nd and 24th Battalions of the London Regiment, which from 1937 became the 6th (Bermondsey) and 7th (Southwark) Battalions of the Queen's Royal Regiment (West Surrey).

A major reorganisation in 1938 saw the TA divisions reduced from twelve to nine battalions. As a result, 9th Middlesex was converted to 60th (Middlesex) Searchlight Regiment, RA, the 4th Queen's to 63rd (Queen's) Searchlight Regiment, RA and 5th East Surreys to 57th (East Surrey) Anti-Tank Regiment, RA The latter remained part of the division. In the same year, the 59th (Home Counties)(Cinque Ports) Field Regiment, RA was converted to 75th (Home Counties)(Cinque Ports) Anti-Aircraft Regiment, RA. It was replaced by 65th (8th London) Field Regiment, RA from the former 47th (2nd London) Division.

By 1939 it became clear that a new European war was likely to break out, and the doubling of the Territorial Army was authorised, with each unit and formation forming a duplicate. The 44th (Home Counties) Division formed the 12th (Eastern) Infantry Division. (Note: Between 3 September and 7 October 1939, the units of the 12th (Eastern) Infantry Divisionwere administered by its parent division.)

Changes in infantry between the wars
Battalion	In 1914	Between the wars	44th Division, 1939	12th Division, 1939
Queen's (Royal West Surrey Regiment) – 1921: Queen's Royal Regiment (West Surrey)
4th Battalion	Surrey Brigade	1938 – Converted to 63rd (Queen's) Searchlight Regiment, RA		
5th Battalion	Surrey Brigade	5th Battalion	1/5th Battalion in 131st Brigade	2/5th Battalion in 35th Brigade
22nd (The Queen's) London	6th London Brigade	1937 – 6th (Bermondsey) Battalion	1/6th Battalion in 131st Brigade	2/6th Battalion in 35th Brigade
24th (The Queen's) London	6th London Brigade	1937 – 7th (Southwark) Battalion	1/7th Battalion in 131st Brigade	2/7th Battalion in 35th Brigade
Buffs (East Kent Regiment) – 1935: Buffs (Royal East Kent Regiment)
4th Battalion	Kent Brigade	1921 – Amalgamated as 4th/5th Battalion	4th Battalion in 133rd Brigade	5th Battalion in 37th Brigade
5th (The Weald of Kent) Battalion	Kent Brigade	1921 – Amalgamated as 4th/5th Battalion	4th Battalion in 133rd Brigade	5th Battalion in 37th Brigade
East Surrey Regiment
5th Battalion	Surrey Brigade	1938 – Converted to 57th (East Surrey) Anti-Tank Regiment, RA		
6th Battalion	Surrey Brigade	6th Battalion	1/6th Battalion in 132nd Brigade	2/6th Battalion in 36th Brigade
Royal Sussex Regiment
4th Battalion	attached to HC Division	4th Battalion	4th Battalion in 133rd Brigade	6th Battalion in 37th Brigade
5th (Cinque Ports) Battalion	attached to HC Division	5th (Cinque Ports) Battalion	5th Battalion in 133rd Brigade	7th Battalion in 37th Brigade
Queen's Own (Royal West Kent Regiment) – April 1921: Queen's Own Royal West Kent Regiment
4th Battalion	Kent Brigade	4th Battalion	4th Battalion in 132nd Brigade	6th Battalion in 36th Brigade
5th Battalion	Kent Brigade	5th Battalion	5th Battalion in 132nd Brigade	7th Battalion in 36th Brigade
Duke of Cambridge's Own (Middlesex Regiment) – 1921: Middlesex Regiment (Duke of Cambridge's Own)
7th Battalion	Middlesex Brigade	1936 – Converted to a Machine Gun Battalion		
8th Battalion	Middlesex Brigade	1936 – Converted to a Machine Gun Battalion		
9th Battalion	Middlesex Brigade	1938 – Converted to 60th (Middlesex) Searchlight Regiment, RA		
10th Battalion	Middlesex Brigade	1921 – Converted to Home Counties Divisional Signals, RCS		

=== Second World War ===
The division, as the 44th (Home Counties) Infantry Division (Major-General Edmund Osborne), was mobilised on 3 September 1939 on the outbreak of the Second World War. Initially in Southern and then Eastern Command, the division was sent overseas where it joined the British Expeditionary Force (BEF) in France on 1 April 1940 and was assigned to III Corps (Lieutenant-General Ronald Forbes Adam). It took part in the Battle of St Omer-La Bassée (23–29 May) during the retreat to Dunkirk. At the end of May 1940 the division was evacuated from at Dunkirk after the German Army threatened to cut off and destroy the entire BEF from the French Army during the battles of France and Belgium.

After returning to England the division, much reduced in manpower and woefully short of equipment and now under the command of Major-General Arthur Percival (who had taken command in late June 1940, until late March the following year), spent nearly two years on home defence, anticipating a German invasion which never occurred, travelling through the counties of Kent and Sussex and serving under I and XII Corps. On 29 May 1942, the division, now under the control of the War Office and commanded by Major-General Ivor Hughes, departed the United Kingdom to take part in the North African Campaign. It arrived in Cairo, Egypt on 24 July – the long journey being due to sailing via the Cape of Good Hope.

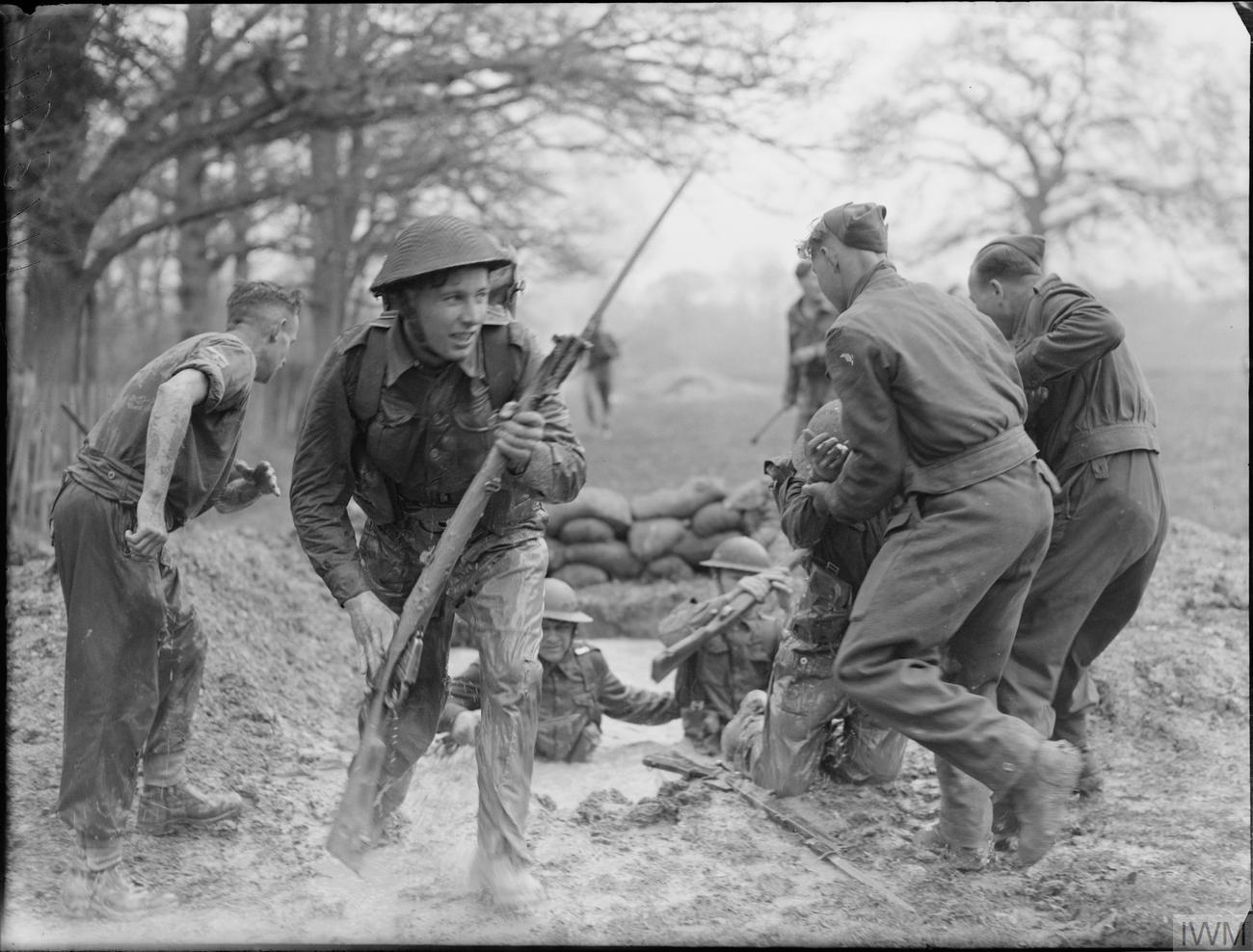
A soldier emerges from the 'mud bath' during training at the 44th Divisional battle school at Dene Park, Tonbridge in Kent, 22 April 1942.

Less than three weeks after its arrival the division was ordered by General Sir Harold Alexander (replacing General Sir Claude Auchinleck on 13 August), the Commander-in-Chief (C-in-C), Middle East, to be sent forward to join the Eighth Army (Lieutenant General Bernard Montgomery), at El Alamein. The 44th Division joined XIII Corps (Lieutenant-General Brian Horrocks, commander of the division between June 1941 and March 1942) and fought at the Battle of Alam el Halfa (30 August – 7 September) where the 132nd Brigade was temporarily detached to the 2nd New Zealand Division and suffered nearly 700 casualties.

On 8 September, the 133rd Brigade was detached from the division. It was briefly assigned to the 8th Armoured Division before being transferred to the 10th Armoured Division on 29 September as a lorried infantry unit. The division started the Second Battle of El Alamein (23 October – 4 November) with two brigades. It was still in XIII Corps, with the 7th Armoured Division and 50th (Northumbrian) Infantry Division. The corps was on the southern flank with the task of tying down Axis reserves while the main thrust was made in the north by XXX and X Corps. The division was further reduced when the 131st Brigade was attached to the 7th Armoured Division on 1 November, as a lorried infantry brigade after the 7th Motor Brigade was transferred to the 1st Armoured Division.

The Battle of El Alamein was the last engagement of the 44th Division; it was disbanded on 31 January 1943. (Note: 57th and 58th Field Regiments, RA joined the Eighth Army, 65th Field Regiment, RA transferred to 50th (Northumbrian) Infantry Division, 57th Anti-Tank Regiment, RA also joined the Eighth Army and the 30th LAA Regiment, RA was assigned to Middle East Command. The 6th Cheshires (MG Battalion) and 44th Recce joined the 56th (London) Infantry Division.) The 132nd and 133rd Brigade were dispersed, with the battalions ending up as British battalions in British Indian Army brigades. (Note: 2nd Buffs joined the 26th Indian Infantry Brigade, 4th QORWK joined the 161st Indian Infantry Brigade and 5th QORWK joined the 21st Indian Infantry Brigade; the 2nd Royal Sussex joined the 24th Indian Infantry Brigade, 4th and 5th Royal Sussex were amalgamated as 4th/5th Royal Sussex and joined the 27th Indian Infantry Brigade.) The 131st Brigade remained in the 7th Armoured Division for the rest of the war, taking part in the rest of the North African Campaign, culminating in May 1943 with the surrender of almost 250,000 Axis soldiers as prisoners of war, the Allied invasion of Italy from September–November 1943 and in the North-West Europe campaign from June 1944 until Victory in Europe Day in May 1945.

=== Post Second World War ===
The Territorial Army (TA) was formally disbanded at the end of the Second World War. TA units were reactivated on 1 January 1947, though no personnel were assigned until commanding officers and permanent staff had been appointed in March and April 1947. The division, under the command of Major-General Philip Gregson-Ellis, was reformed in 1947; it included the Northamptonshire Yeomanry, and 47th (London), 131st (Surrey), and 133rd (Kent & Sussex) Infantry Brigades.

On 1 May 1961, all ten TA divisions were merged with the districts, and the division became 44th (Home Counties) Division/District, thus ending the division's separate existence. Subsequently, redesignated as South Eastern District, it was used to form the 4th Division on 1 April 1995.

== Orders of battle ==
Order of Battle – August 1914
Just before the outbreak of the First World War, the division commanded the following units:
Surrey Brigade: 4th Battalion, Queen's (Royal West Surrey Regiment); 5th Battalion, Queen's (Royal West Surrey Regiment); 5th Battalion, East Surrey Regiment; 6th Battalion, East Surrey Regiment	Royal Artillery: I Home Counties Brigade, RFA; 1st Sussex Battery; 2nd Sussex Battery; 3rd Sussex Battery; I Home Counties Brigade Ammunition Column; II Home Counties Brigade, RFA; 4th Sussex Battery; 5th Sussex Battery; 6th Sussex Battery; II Home Counties Brigade Ammunition Column; III Home Counties Brigade (Cinque Ports), RFA; 1st Kent Battery; 2nd Kent Battery; 3rd Kent Battery; III Home Counties Brigade Ammunition Column; IV Home Counties (H) Brigade, RFA (Note: 1/IV Home Counties (Howitzer) Brigade, RFA remained in England when its parent division went to India in October 1914. It went to France on 21 December 1914 as 27th Division Ammunition Column but returned to the UK, reformed as an artillery brigade and joined 67th (2nd Home Counties) Division in June 1915. It was posted to the Western Front on 10 March 1916, joining the Fourth Army before transferring to the 63rd (Royal Naval) Division on 18 July 1916.); 4th Kent (H) Battery; 5th Kent (H) Battery; IV Home Counties (H) Brigade Ammunition Column; Home Counties (Kent) Heavy Battery, RGA; Home Counties (Kent) Ammunition Column	Divisional troops Home Counties Divisional Engineers: 1st Home Counties Field Company, Royal Engineers; 2nd Home Counties Field Company, Royal Engineers; Home Counties Divisional Signal Company, Royal Engineers; Royal Army Medical Corps: 1st Home Counties Field Ambulance; 2nd Home Counties Field Ambulance; 3rd Home Counties Field Ambulance; Home Counties Clearing Hospital; Home Counties Divisional Train, ASC: Divisional Company (Headquarters); Surrey Brigade Company; Kent Brigade Company; Middlesex Brigade Company
Middlesex Brigade: 7th Battalion, Duke of Cambridge's Own (Middlesex Regiment); 8th Battalion, Duke of Cambridge's Own (Middlesex Regiment); 9th Battalion, Duke of Cambridge's Own (Middlesex Regiment); 10th Battalion, Duke of Cambridge's Own (Middlesex Regiment)
Kent Brigade: 4th Battalion, Buffs (East Kent Regiment); 5th (The Weald of Kent) Battalion, Buffs (East Kent Regiment); 4th Battalion, Queen's Own (Royal West Kent Regiment); 5th Battalion, Queen's Own (Royal West Kent Regiment)
Attached: 4th Battalion, Royal Sussex Regiment; 5th (Cinque Ports) Battalion, Royal Sussex Regiment

Order of Battle – September 1939
The division commanded the following units in the Second World War:
131st Infantry Brigade: 1/5th Battalion, Queen's Royal Regiment (West Surrey); 1/6th Battalion, Queen's Royal Regiment (West Surrey); 1/7th Battalion, Queen's Royal Regiment (West Surrey) (Note: 2nd Buffs replaced 1/7th Queen's in 131st Brigade from 4 May 1940. 1/7th Queen's joined 132nd Brigade from 1 July 1940 to 1 July 1941 before swopping places with 2nd Buffs.); 2nd Battalion, Buffs (Royal East Kent Regiment)	Royal Artillery: 57th (Home Counties) Field Regiment, RA; 58th (Sussex) Field Regiment, RA; 65th (8th London) Field Regiment, RA; 57th (East Surrey) Anti-Tank Regiment, RA; 99th Light Anti-Aircraft Regiment, RA (3 February–25 March 1942); 30th Light Anti-Aircraft Regiment, RA (from 4 April 1942); 44th (Home Counties) Divisional Engineers: 208th (Sussex) Field Company, Royal Engineers (Note: 208th Field Company was replaced by 11th Field Company on 4 May 1940.); 209th (Sussex) Field Company, Royal Engineers; 210th (Sussex) Field Company, Royal Engineers; 211th (Sussex) Field Park Company, Royal Engineers; 11th Field Company, Royal Engineers (from 4 May 1940); Royal Corps of Signals: 44th (Home Counties) Divisional Signals; Machine Gun Battalion: 6th Battalion, Cheshire Regiment (Note: 6th Cheshires joined as the divisional Machine Gun Battalion on 11 November 1941 and left on 24 November 1942.); Reconnaissance: 44th Battalion, Reconnaissance Corps (Note: 44th Battalion, Reconnaissance Corps joined as the divisional reconnaissance unit on 6 January 1941, was redesignated as 44th Regiment, Reconnaissance Corps on 6 June 1942 and left on 24 November 1942.)
132nd Infantry Brigade: 1/6th Battalion, East Surrey Regiment (Note: 1/6th East Surreys was replaced in 132nd Brigade by 1st QORWK on 4 May 1940. In turn, it was replaced by 1/7th Queen's from 131st Brigade on 29 June 1940.); 4th Battalion, Queen's Own Royal West Kent Regiment; 5th Battalion, Queen's Own Royal West Kent Regiment; 1st Battalion, Queen's Own Royal West Kent Regiment; 1/7th Battalion, Queen's Royal Regiment (West Surrey); 2nd Battalion, Buffs (Royal East Kent Regiment)
133rd Infantry Brigade: 4th Battalion, Buffs (Royal East Kent Regiment); 4th Battalion, Royal Sussex Regiment; 5th (Cinque Ports) Battalion, Royal Sussex Regiment; 2nd Battalion, Royal Sussex Regiment

Order of Battle – January 1947

The division was reformed after the Second World War with the following units:

* Headquarters 44th Infantry Division
  - 44th Divisional Signal Regiment, Royal Corps of Signals, Hounslow
  - Northamptonshire Yeomanry, Northampton, divisional armoured reconnaissance
  - 44th Divisional Royal Army Service Corps, Croydon
  - 44th Divisional Royal Electrical and Mechanical Engineers
  - 44th Divisional Royal Army Medical Corps
- 47th (London) Infantry Brigade
  - HQ 47th Infantry Brigade
  - 7th Battalion, The Duke of Cambridge's Own Middlesex Regiment, Hornsey
  - Queen Victoria's Rifles, Westminster
  - Queen's Westminster Regiment, Westminster
- 131st (Surrey) Infantry Brigade
  - HQ 131st Infantry Brigade
  - 5th Battalion, The Queen's Royal West Surrey Regiment, Guildford
  - 6th (Bermondsey) Battalion, The Queen's Royal West Surrey Regiment, Bermondsey
  - 6th Battalion, The East Surrey Regiment, Surbiton
- 133rd (Kent and Sussex) Infantry Brigade
  - HQ 133rd Infantry Brigade
  - 4th/5th Battalion, Royal East Kent Regiment (Buffs), Canterbury
  - 4th/5th (Cinque Ports) Battalion, Royal Sussex Regiment, Worthing
  - 4th/5th Battalion, Royal West Kent Regiment, Tonbridge
- Commander Royal Artillery, 44th Division
  - CRA Headquarters
  - 257th (Home Counties) Field Regiment, Royal Artillery, Brighton
  - 264th (7th London) Field Regiment, Royal Artillery, Fulham
  - 298th (Surrey Yeomanry, Queen Mary's) Field Regiment, Royal Artillery, Clapham
  - 381st (East Surrey) Anti-Tank Regiment, Royal Artillery, Wimbledon
  - 297th (Kent Yeomanry) Light Anti-Aircraft Regiment, Royal Artillery, Maidstone
- Commander Royal Engineers, 44th Division
  - CRE Headquarters
  - 119th Field Engineer Regiment, Royal Engineers, Eastbourne
  - 44th Divisional Field Park, Royal Engineers

== Commanders ==
The Home Counties Division had the following commanders, from formation in April 1908 to disembarkation in India:

From	Rank	Name	Notes
April 1908	Major-General	Colin G. Donald	
January 1909	Major-General	Edward T. Dickson	
April 1912	Major-General	Charles V.F. Townshend	
25 October 1912	Major-General	James C. Young	Broken up in December 1914

When the division was re-established after the First World War, it had the following commanders until it was disbanded in the Middle East on 31 January 1943:

From	Rank	Name	Notes
July 1919	Major-General	Sir John R. Longley	
June 1923	Major-General	Sir Henry W. Hodgson	
June 1927	Major-General	Arthur G. Wauchope	
January 1929	Major-General	Henry R. Peck	
January 1933	Major-General	John Kennedy	
April 1934	Major-General	John R. Minshull-Ford	
April 1938	Major-General	Edmund Osborne	
25 June 1940	Major-General	Arthur E. Percival	
27 March 1941	Brigadier	F.C.A. Troup	acting
31 March 1941	Brigadier	J.E. Utterson-Kelso	acting
8 April 1941	Major-General	Frank N. Mason-Macfarlane	
25 June 1941	Major-General	Brian G. Horrocks	
14 March 1942	Brigadier	Ivor T.P. Hughes	acting
20 March 1942	Major-General	Ivor T.P. Hughes	Disbanded on 31 January 1943

When the division was re-established after the Second World War, it had the following commanders until 1 May 1961 when the Territorial Army divisional headquarters were merged with regular army districts:

From	Rank	Name	Notes
1 January 1947	Major-General	Hugh C. Stockwell	
July 1947	Major-General	Philip G.S. Gregson-Ellis	
July 1950	Major-General	Brian C.H. Kimmins	
March 1952	Major-General	E. Otway Herbert	
January 1954	Major-General	Robert C.M. King	
November 1956	Major-General	William F.R. Turner	
November 1959	Major-General	Paul Gleadell	
January 1962	Major-General	Ewing H.W. Grimshaw	
July 1965	Major-General	F. Brian Wyldbore-Smith	Disbanded in 1968

== See also ==
- 67th (2nd Home Counties) Division for the 2nd Line formation in the First World War
- 12th (Eastern) Division for the duplicate formation in the Second World War
- List of British divisions in World War I
- List of British divisions in World War II
- British Army Order of Battle (September 1939)
- Second Battle of El Alamein order of battle

== Bibliography ==
- Becke, Archibald F. (1935). Order of Battle of Divisions Part 1–The Regular British Divisions. London: HMSO. OCLC 4405016.
- Becke, Archibald F. (1936). Order of Battle of Divisions Part 2A. The Territorial Force Mounted Divisions and the 1st-Line Territorial Force Divisions (42–56). London: HMSO. OCLC 4405016.
- Becke, Archibald F. (1937). Order of Battle of Divisions Part 2B. The 2nd-Line Territorial Force Divisions (57th–69th) with The Home-Service Divisions (71st–73rd) and 74th and 75th Divisions. London: HMSO. OCLC 4405016.
- Beckett, Ian F. W. (2008). Territorials: A Century of Service. Plymouth: DRA Publishing. ISBN 978-0-9557813-1-5.
- Bellis, Malcolm A. (1994). Regiments of the British Army 1939–1945 (Armour & Infantry). London: Military Press International. ISBN 0-85420-999-9.
- Bellis, Malcolm A. (1995). Regiments of the British Army 1939–1945 (Artillery). London: Military Press International. ISBN 0-85420-110-6.
- Frederick, J. B. M. (1984). Lineage Book of British Land Forces 1660–1978. Wakefield, Yorkshire: Microform Academic Publishers. ISBN 1-85117-009-X.
- James, E. A. (1978). British Regiments 1914–18. London: Samson Books. ISBN 0-906304-03-2.
- Joslen, H. F. (1990) [1st. Pub. HMSO:1960]. Orders of Battle, Second World War, 1939–1945. London: London Stamp Exchange. ISBN 0-948130-03-2.
- Mackie, Colin (June 2015). "Army Commands 1900–2011" (PDF). www.gulabin.com. Archived from the original (PDF) on 5 July 2015.
- Col L.F. Morling, Sussex Sappers: A History of the Sussex Volunteer and Territorial Army Royal Engineer Units from 1890 to 1967, Seaford: 208th Field Co, RE/Christians–W. J. Offord, 1972.
- Perry, F. W. (1993). Order of Battle of Divisions Part 5B. Indian Army Divisions. Newport: Ray Westlake Military Books. ISBN 1-871167-23-X.
- Rinaldi, Richard A. (2008). Order of Battle of the British Army 1914. Ravi Rikhye. ISBN 978-0-97760728-0.
- Westlake, Ray (1986). The Territorial Battalions, A Pictorial History, 1859–1985. Tunbridge Wells: Spellmount. ISBN 978-0-946771-68-4.
- Westlake, Ray (1992). British Territorial Units 1914–18. Men-at-Arms Series. Vol. 245. Osprey. ISBN 978-1-85532-168-7.
