= Edmund Osborne =

British Army general

Lieutenant-General Edmund Osborne CB DSO
- Born: 26 July 1885
- Died: 1 June 1969 (aged 83)
- Military career
- Allegiance: United Kingdom
- Branch: British Army
- Service years: 1904–1941
- Rank: Lieutenant-General
- Nickname: "Sigs"
- Service number: 3164
- Units: Royal Engineers; Royal Corps of Signals
- Commands: II Corps (1940–1941); 44th (Home Counties) Division (1938–1940); Cairo Brigade (1934–1938); 157th (Highland Light Infantry) Brigade (1933–1934); School of Signals (1926–1930)
- Conflicts: First World War; Second World War
- Awards: Companion of the Order of the Bath; Distinguished Service Order; Mentioned in Despatches (8)

Lieutenant-General Edmund Archibald Osborne, CB, DSO (26 July 1885 – 1 June 1969) was a British Army officer who commanded II Corps during the Second World War.

== Military career ==
Osborne entered the Royal Military Academy, Woolwich, and was commissioned as a second lieutenant into the Royal Engineers, British Army, in 1904. He served in the First World War where, in September 1914, he was awarded the Distinguished Service Order, with the citation reading:

Repeated gallantry and coolness in action on 31st October. He recovered a cable wagon which had been abandoned by the enemy. Has frequently shown great capacity for command.

He continued to serve with distinction during the war, being mentioned in despatches eight times.

With the war over in November 1918, in January 1920 he succeeded Brevet Major Bernard Paget as a general staff officer, grade 2 and for which he was promoted to the temporary rank of major while so employed. He then attended the Staff College, Camberley, from 1921 to 1922 and later became commander of the School of Signals in 1926. He went on to be a general staff officer with the 3rd Infantry Division in 1930. Osborne subsequently became commander of the 157th (Highland Light Infantry) Brigade in 1933 and commander of the Cairo Brigade in Egypt in 1934.

Osborne served in the Second World War, initially as General Officer Commanding (GOC) 44th (Home Counties) Division from April 1938 and then as GOC II Corps from 1940 until he retired from the British Army in 1941.

== Bibliography ==
- Smart, Nick (2005). Biographical Dictionary of British Generals of the Second World War. Barnsley, South Yorkshire: Pen and Sword Books. ISBN 1844150496.

Military offices
Preceded by John Minshull-Ford	GOC 44th (Home Counties) Division; 1938–1940	Succeeded by Arthur Percival
Preceded by Bernard Montgomery	GOC II Corps; 1940–1941	Succeeded by Kenneth Anderson
