= 179th Field Regiment, Royal Artillery =

12th Bn, Worcestershire Regiment 179th Field Regiment, RA
- Cap badge of the Royal Artillery.
- Active: 1 March 1942–7 March 1946
- Country: United Kingdom
- Branch: British Army
- Type: Field artillery
- Size: Batteries
- Part of: 43rd (Wessex) Infantry Division
- Engagements: Operation Epsom; Operation Jupiter; Operation Bluecoat; Operation Market Garden; Operation Clipper; Operation Blackcock; Operation Veritable; Operation Plunder

Commanders
- Notable commanders: Lieutenant-Col Brian Wyldbore-Smith

The 179th Field Regiment was a unit of the Royal Artillery, formed by the British Army during World War II. First raised in 1940 as infantry of the Worcestershire Regiment, after serving in the garrison of Iceland it was converted to the field artillery role in 1942. It fought with 43rd (Wessex) Division in the campaign in North West Europe. It was disbanded after the war.

== 12th Worcestershire Regiment ==
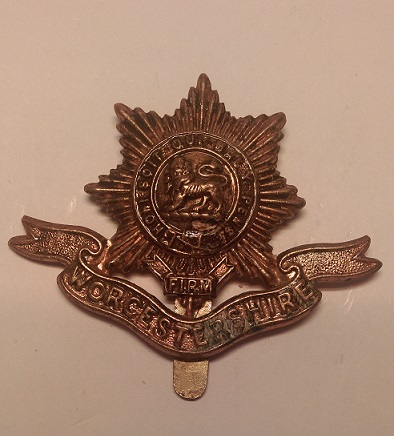
Cap badge of the Worcestershire Regiment.

In May 1940, as part of the rapid expansion of the British Army in World War II, the Worcestershire Regiment, based at Worcester, raised its 50th (Holding) Battalion, which assembled at Burton upon Trent on 1 June under the command of Lieutenant-Colonel A.P. Watkins. The battalion originally consisted of three rifle companies of conscripts and a fourth formed from men returning from the Dunkirk evacuation, some 250 of whom were housed and reclothed by the battalion. During August and September D Company was involved in guarding a camp of French sailors interned after Operation Catapult had neutralised the French fleet.

On 9 October the holding battalion was converted to a conventional infantry role as 12th Battalion. (A previous 12th (Service) Battalion had been raised as part of Kitchener's Army during World War I of 1914–18.) It moved from Burton to Dudley on 15 October, where the men were frequently employed clearing air raid debris during the Birmingham Blitz. It then moved on 25 February 1941 to Llanelli, where its main role was beach defence, with C Company at Pembrey Sands near RAF Pembrey and D Company at Ashburnham beaches, a total length of about 15 miles (24 km).

On 4 June 1941, the battalion sailed from Greenock to Reykjavík to join the Occupation of Iceland under the command of 49th (West Riding) Division. From 13 June it was deployed with Battalion HQ and two companies at Reykjaskóli, D Company at Blönduós and B Company at Borgarnes, separated by about 50 miles (80 km). There was little to do on Iceland, but training opportunities were excellent. On 19 September the battalion handed over its commitments to 6th Battalion, US Marine Corps and sailed back to Greenock, landing on 25 September. The battalion was sent to Milton Barracks, Gravesend, with companies deployed to defend airfields in Kent.

== 179th Field Regiment, RA ==
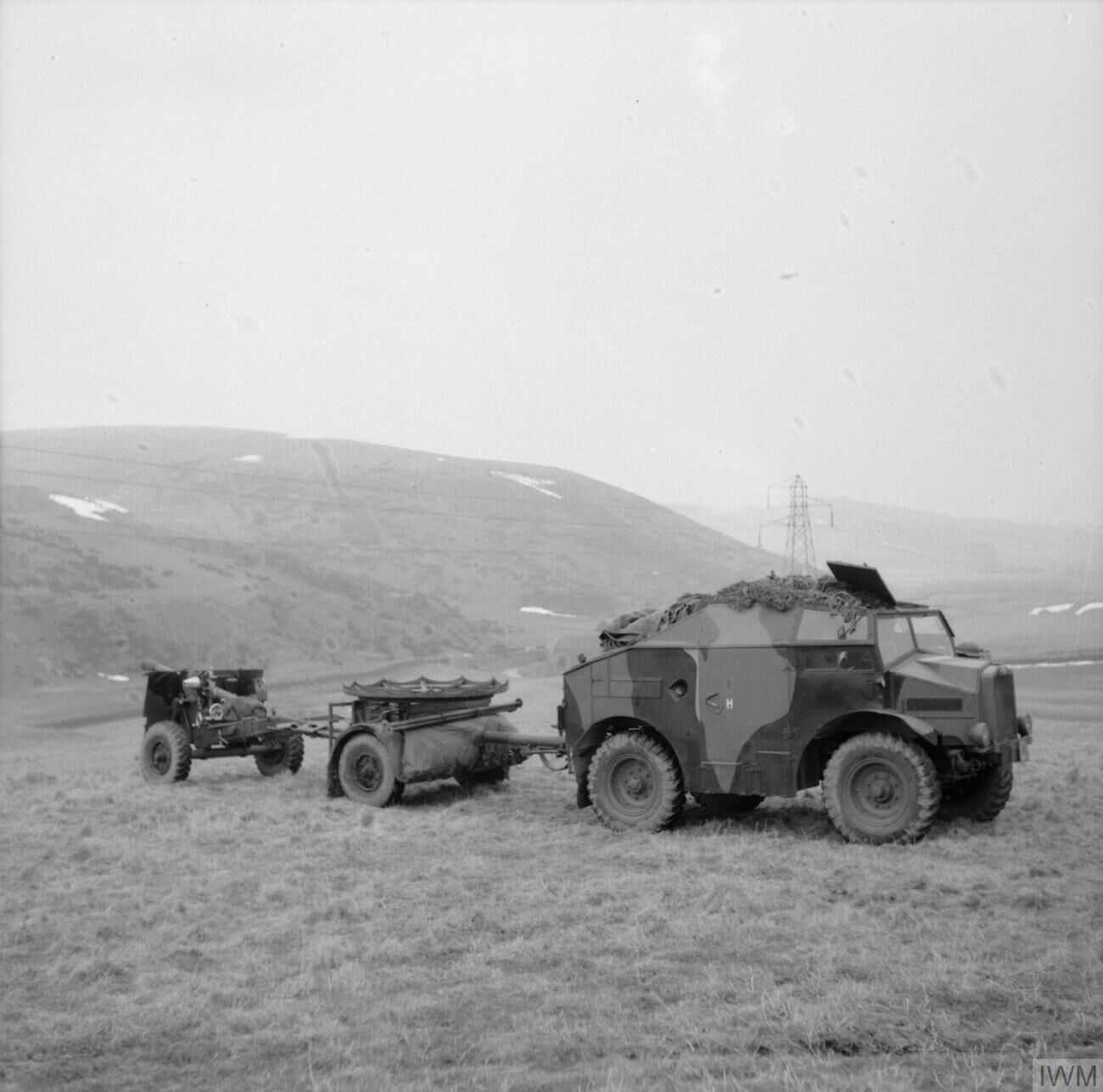
25-pounder gun and Morris C8 Quad tractor on exercises in the UK.

179th Field Regiment, RA, officially came into existence on 1 March 1942 with most of its personnel drawn from 12th Worcesters. It was organised with three batteries, Q, R and S, each to be equipped with eight Mk II 25-pounder guns. The batteries were redesignated P, Q and R on 11 March, and finally numbered as 171, 172 and 173 Field Btys on 1 January 1943.

Initially the regiment remained unattached under control of the War Office then on 9 June it joined 43rd (Wessex) Division. At the time the division was stationed in Kent, undergoing intensive training. Once the division had settled down to its permanent organisation in September 1943, 179th Field Rgt was usually linked with 214th Brigade for training and operations. Artillery regimental and battery commanders lived with the brigades and battalions they were to support, and Forward Observation Officers (FOOs) and their signallers were in close touch with the frontline infantry companies. From the spring of 1943 43rd (W) Division was assigned to 21st Army Group and training was directed towards the Allied invasion of Normandy, Operation Overlord.

=== Normandy ===
43rd (W) Division moved into its concentration area in Sussex round Battle, Hastings and Rye by 6 April 1944. D Day for Overlord was 6 June, and on 13 June the division began moving to the embarkation ports. Disembarkation was delayed by bad weather, but the bulk of the division was concentrated north of Bayeux by 24 June with VIII Corps.

43rd (Wessex) Division's formation sign.

The division was committed to its first action in the Battle of the Odon (Operation Epsom) starting on 26 June. The object was to follow 15th (Scottish) Division's advance and then secure the captured objectives in 'Scottish Corridor'. However, this entailed some heavy fighting for the infantry against a Panzer counter-attack on 27 June, an attack cross open cornfields on 28 June, and an advance under fire to ford the River Odon and dig in on 29 June. A German counter-attack against them in the evening was destroyed by the divisional artillery. Lieutenant-Col G. Pethick, commanding officer (CO) of 179th Fd Rgt, was wounded near Cheux on 27 June and Major Sir John Backhouse, 3rd Baronet, took temporary command for the remainder of the operation. Lieutenant-Col William Blacker took over command, but he was killed at Cheux on 11 July. Lieutenant-Col Brian Wyldbore-Smith then commanded the regiment for the rest of the campaign.

The division's first major offensive action of its own was Operation Jupiter, to take Hill 112, which had been briefly captured by British armour during 'Epsom' but had to be abandoned. The attack on 10 July was supported by all the divisional artillery and mortars, plus the artillery of adjacent divisions. It was supposed to break through and seize bridgeheads over the River Orne, but the massive barrage only stunned and failed to suppress the defenders from 10th SS Panzer Division. When the Wessex infantry went forward they came under heavy fire as they fought their way up the slopes. The fighting drew in all the reserves until 5th Battalion Duke of Cornwall's Light Infantry (DCLI) was the last uncommitted battalion. It attacked up the slopes of Hill 112, described as 'one of the most tragic acts of self-sacrifice in the entire North West European Campaign'. Launched at 20.30 towards 'The Orchard' on the crest of the hill, and supported by a squadron of tanks and all available guns, the attack reached the orchard, but could get no further. The DCLI held out through the night but by mid-afternoon on 11 July all the anti-tank guns on the hill had been knocked out, the tanks had to retire to the reverse slope, and the defence was almost over. When the order was given to withdraw some 60 survivors of 5th DCLI were brought down. Both sides remained dug in on the slopes, with the hilltop left in No man's land. The division had to hold its positions under mortar fire for another 10 days, described by the commander of 214th Bde as comparable only 'to the bombardment at Passchendaele'. This defence was followed by a final set-piece attack, Operation Express, which succeeded in capturing Maltot on 22 July.

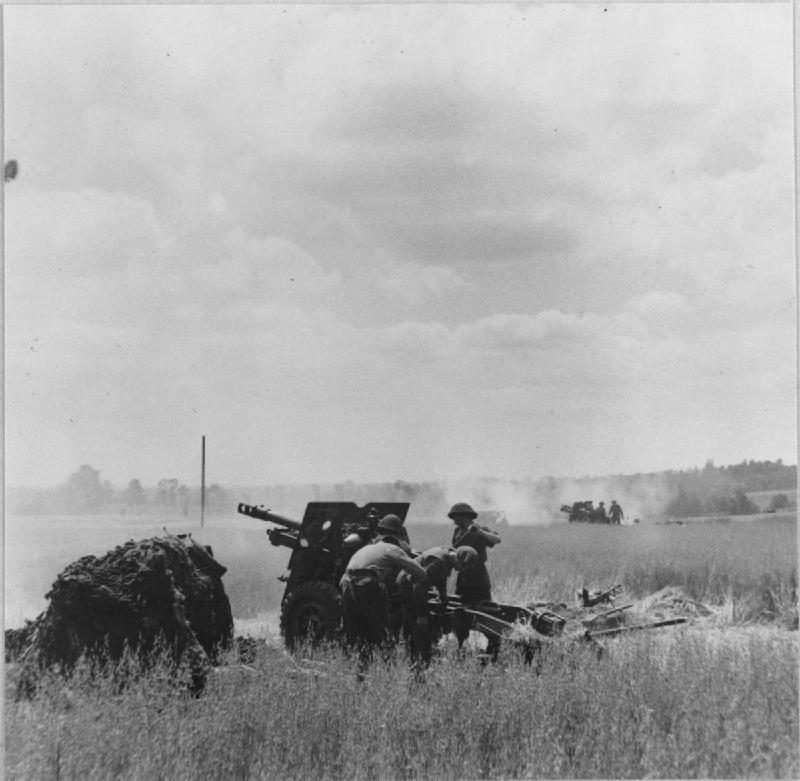
25-pounders in action in Normandy, June 1944.

After a short rest 43rd (W) Division moved to XXX Corps to launch an attack towards the dominating height of Mont Pinçon as part of Operation Bluecoat. Casualties were heavy, particularly from mines, and the advance was slow. After a succession of pre-dawn attacks, the division was still 4 miles (6.4 km) from Mont Pinçon on 5 August. In the end the hill fell to a surprise attack by a few tanks on the evening of 6 August. By daybreak the summit was firmly held by tanks and infantry, despite heavy German bombardment.

43rd (W) Division then participated in XXX Corps' pursuit of the broken enemy, many of whom were caught in the Falaise pocket. The main opposition came from mortars and booby-trapped mines.

=== Seine crossing ===
The breakout achieved, XXX Corps drove flat out for the River Seine (Operation Loopy), with 43rd (W) Division sent ahead to make an assault crossing at Vernon. The division had to move in three groups at specific times to cross a road that was also being used by US troops. The roughly 100 vehicles of 112th Field Rgt moved with the bulk of the divisional artillery in Group Two and arrived too late to participate in the bombardment covering the initial assault crossing on the evening of 25 August.

The assault was followed by two days of bitter fighting as the defenders counter-attacked the bridgeheads and shelled the bridging sites. The divisional artillery assembled on the hillside overlooking Vernon and fired with the assistance of air observation post aircraft against the counter-attacks on the other side of the river. By 28 August the Sappers had bridged the river, the armour had begun to cross in numbers and 130th Bde was clearing the high ground opposite, allowing the artillery reconnaissance parties to follow up. Major Sir John Backhouse was killed on 29 August when these clashed with a German Flak88 gun in the woods at close range. After the Seine crossing, 43rd (W) Division was 'grounded' while the rest of XXX Corps raced across northern France and Belgium.

=== Operation Market Garden ===
When 43rd (W) Division next moved, the war was now 250 miles (400 km) away. The first elements moved up to Brussels to protect headquarters, then the division concentrated at Diest to take part in Operation Market Garden, beginning on 17 September. In 'Garden', the ground part of the operation, XXX Corps was to link up river crossings as far as the Nederrijn at Arnhem via a 'carpet' of airborne troops. 43rd (W) Division was to follow Guards Armoured Division, carrying out assault crossings if any of the bridges were found to be destroyed, and guarding the 'corridor' to Arnhem. The advance up the only road ('Club Route') was slow but on 21 September 43rd (W) Division caught up with the Guards at Nijmegen. Further progress was blocked by strong German forces, and 1st Airborne Division holding out at Arnhem was in a desperate plight. 43rd (W) Division fought its way through to the Nederrijn, with the road behind being frequently cut by German tanks. During the night of 23/24 September the division ferried a few reinforcements across to 1st Airborne, but another assault crossing on the night of 24/25 September suffered heavy casualties and few supplies were got across. By now 1st Airborne had been effectively destroyed, and the only course now was to evacuate the survivors. This was carried out on 25/26 September, a dark night with heavy rain. The whole divisional artillery opened up at 21.00, while the sappers crossed and recrossed the river in stormboats ferrying around 2300 exhausted survivors of 1st Airborne back to the south bank.

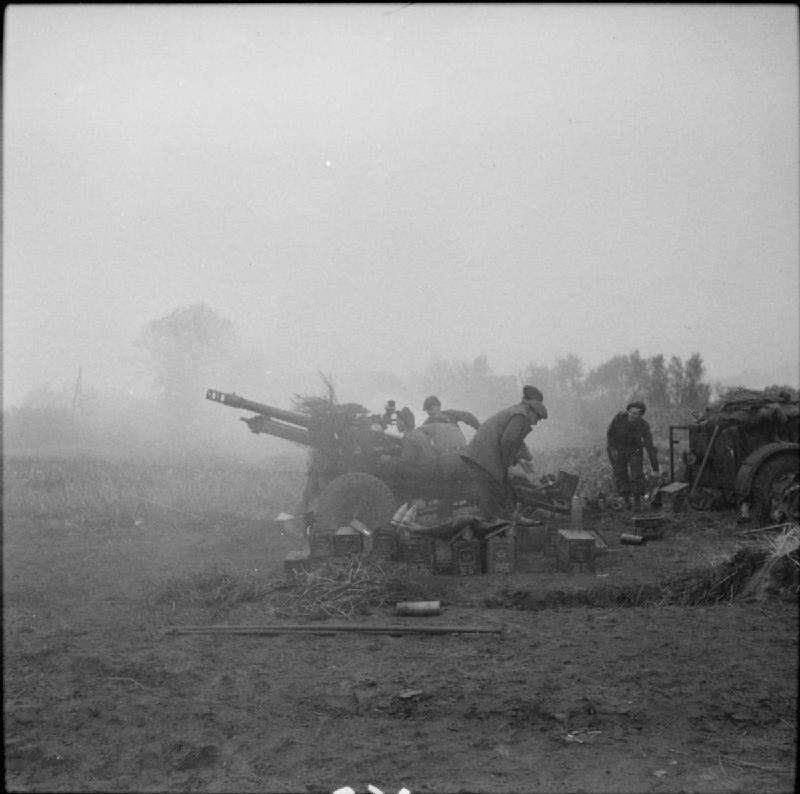
25-pounders in action in the Netherlands October 1944.

In the aftermath of Market Garden, 43rd (W) Division was stationed on 'The Island' (between the Rivers Waal and Nederrijn), fighting off some serious counter-attacks. On 26/27 September sizeable parties of Germans crossed onto the Island, infiltrating into the flank held by 130th Bde and 43rd (Wessex) Reconnaissance Regiment. 214th Bde was deployed to drive them back from Randwijk, covered by a smokescreen fired by 179th Fd Rgt. Clashes continued throughout 43rd (W) Division's stay on the Island.

=== Operation Clipper ===
43rd (W) Division was relieved on 10 November and then shifted east with XXX Corps to cooperate with the Ninth US Army by capturing the Geilenkirchen salient in Operation Clipper. This entailed breaching the Siegfried Line defences and capturing a string of fortified villages. The division's attack was launched on 18 November and after bitter fighting Geilenkirchen was surrounded by nightfall. After driving off some counter-attacks byPanzers during the night, the division captured the town next day. But thereafter heavy rain turned the whole battlefield into mud and guns could not be moved, while the infantry struggled to consolidate their positions under heavy shellfire from the Siegfried Line guns. The divisional artillery endeavoured to support the infantry on the ground. By 22 November any further advance was impossible due to the waterlogged state of the country, which then had to be defended in conditions resembling the worst of the Western Front in World War I. 4th and 5th Battalions Dorset Regiment were bogged down in what became known as 'Dorset Wood', with their gunner observation post (OP): 'In the many gun duels Major P. Steele Perkins of 112 Field Regiment invariably had the last word'.

Planning was under way to renew the offensive when the Germans attacked in the Ardennes (the Battle of the Bulge) on 16 December. 43rd (W) Division was positioned to counter-attack should the Germans cross the Maas. From 20 December a battle group under 43rd (Wessex) Reconnaissance Regiment with 112nd Field Rgt, two anti-tank troops and two infantry companies covered the river with a series of OPs and small detachments holding possible crossing places. The frontage to cover was so wide that the 25-pdrs of 112th Field Rgt were later supplemented by a battery from 94th (Queen's Own Dorset Yeomanry) Field Rgt and by the 5.5-inch guns of 21st (West Riding) Medium Rgt. However, the Panzers got no closer than 12 miles (19 km) before being stopped.

=== Rhineland ===
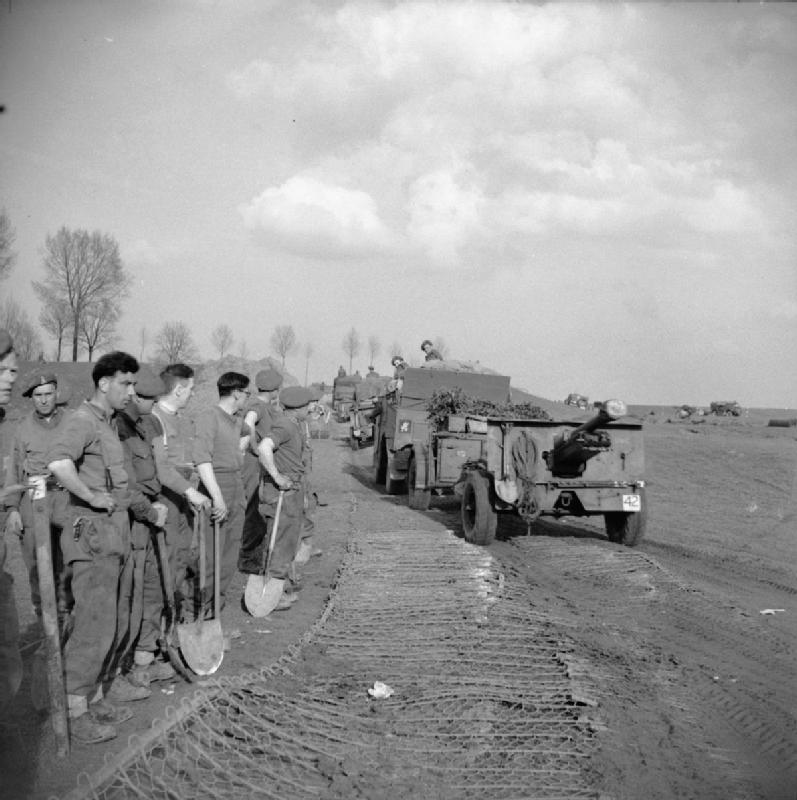
25-pounders moving up to cross the Rhine, March 1945.

Once the German Ardennes Offensive had been halted, 43rd (W) Division returned to the offensive in early 1945 in Operation Blackcock to reduce the Roer Triangle. The advance was supported by massive artillery concentrations. However, further exploitation was prevented by bad weather. The division then fought through the month-long battle of the Reichswald (Operation Veritable). This was also launched before dawn on 8 February with a massive bombardment. The divisional objective was to follow 15th (S) Division's advance and then pass through to capture Kleve. However, the main roads were blocked, the minor roads flooded, and a huge traffic jam of wheeled vehicles resulted. On 15 February 130th Bde struggled to gain a start line for 214th Bde's attack on the Goch escarpment next day. It was finally achieved on the morning of 16 February, and 240th Bde launched its attack at 15.45, with little daylight left. The artillery fireplan had to be changed at the last minute to match this attack, with 179th Fd Rgt having to cover the attacks of two battalions advancing at different rates. (The divisional historian comments that Wyldbore-Smith's solution 'constitutes a brilliant achievement in gunnery'.) For much of the battle only tracked or amphibious vehicles could be used beyond Kleve and the guns were immobile. On 8 March the division entered Xanten on the Rhine.

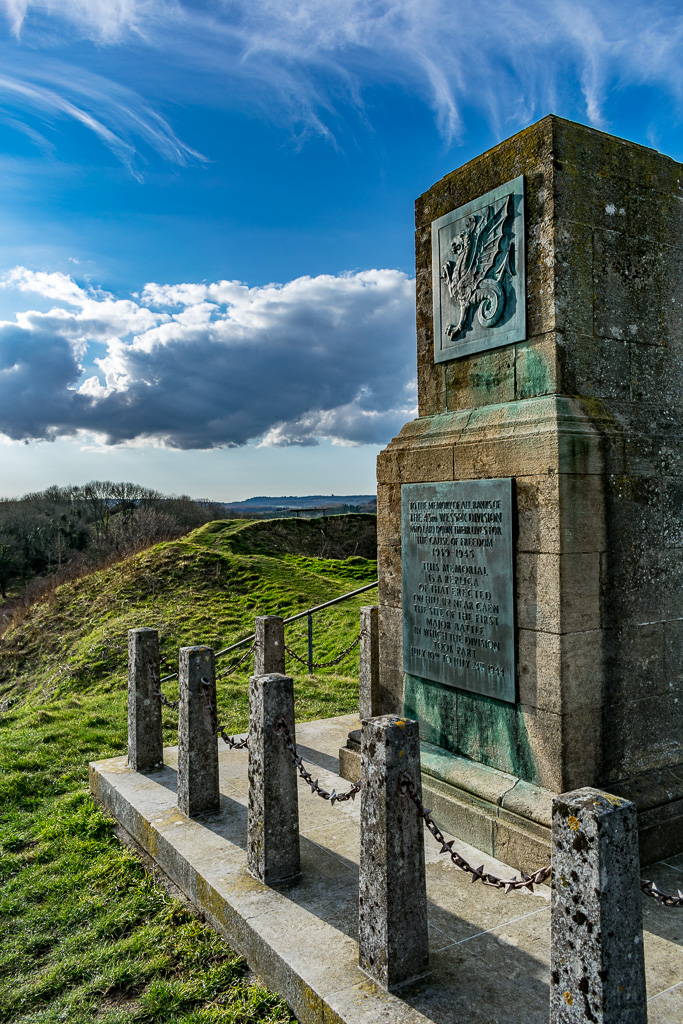
43rd (Wessex) Division's memorial at Castle Hill, Mere, in Wiltshire.

43rd (W) Division was not scheduled to take part in the assault crossing of the Rhine (Operation Plunder) on 23/24 March. However, the division's leading brigade crossed the river on 25 March behind 51st (Highland) Division, and found itself in immediate combat, but had broken through by 29 March. During the subsequent pursuit, 43rd (W) Division was given the task of opening 'Club Route' for XXX Corps. The division combined with 8th Armoured Brigade to form five battle groups for the first 25 miles (40 km) drive. The advance began on 30 March: after initial traffic jams, the groups either overcame or bypassed German rearguards and Lochem was liberated on 1–2 April. The division was then given the task of taking Hengelo to secure the flank while Guards Armoured Division drove for the Dortmund–Ems Canal; 43rd (W) by-passed the end of the Twente Canal and liberated the town. It then moved back into Germany to capture Cloppenburg on 14 April after a stiff fight and fight off a final counter-attack next day.

The pursuit continued through April and ended with the division's capture of Bremen against sporadic opposition and XXX Corps' drive into the Cuxhaven peninsula. On 29 April 214th Bde found itself dealing with rearguards, many of whom came from a Nebelwerfer school intent on firing off their remaining ammunition. 179th Field Rgt dealt with these effectively. The German surrender at Lüneburg Heath came on 4 May, and hostilities ended at 08.00 next day.

The division's units were then employed as occupation forces in XXX Corps' district in Germany. The regiment began disbanding in British Army of the Rhine on 15 February 1946, completing the process by 7 March.
