= Worcestershire Regiment =

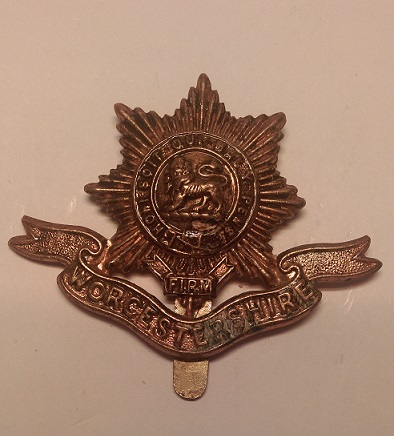
- Cap badge
- Active: 1881–1970
- Country: United Kingdom
- Branch: British Army
- Type: Infantry
- Role: Line infantry
- Size: 1–4 Regular Battalions 2 Militia and Special Reserve Battalions; 1–4 Territorial and Volunteer Battalions Up to 14 Hostilities-only Battalions
- RHQ: Norton Barracks, Worcestershire
- Motto: Firm
- March: Quick: Royal Windsor, The Poacher; Slow: Duchess of Kent
- Anniversaries: Glorious First of June, 1 June; Battle of Gheluvelt, 31 Oct

The Worcestershire Regiment was a line infantry regiment in the British Army, formed in 1881 under the Childers Reforms by the amalgamation of the 29th (Worcestershire) Regiment of Foot and the 36th (Herefordshire) Regiment of Foot. The regiment fought in many conflicts, including both the First and Second World Wars, until 1970, when it was amalgamated with the Sherwood Foresters (Nottinghamshire and Derbyshire Regiment) to form the Worcestershire and Sherwood Foresters Regiment (29th/44th Foot). In September 2007, the regiment amalgamated with the Cheshire Regiment and the Staffordshire Regiment (Prince of Wales's) to form the Mercian Regiment.

== History ==
=== Early years ===
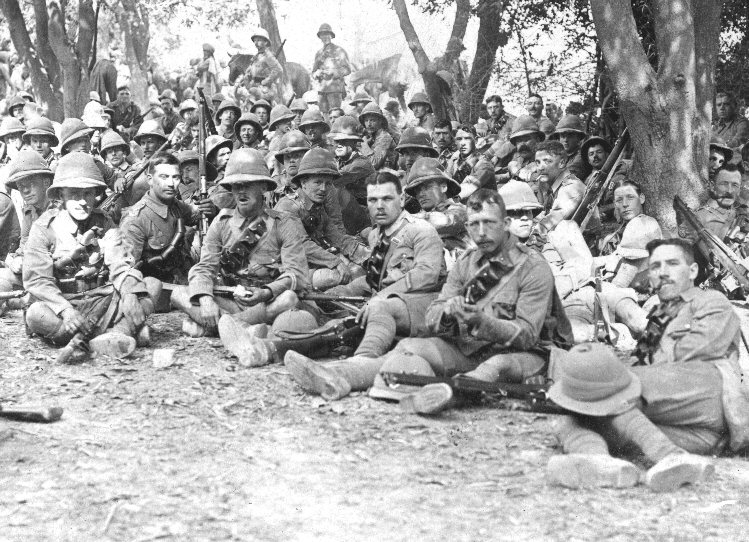
Men of the 4th Battalion, Worcestershire Regiment, resting after a march in Bareilly, India, 1910.

The Worcestershire Regiment, the Worcesters, was formed in July 1881 under the Childers Reforms by the amalgamation of the 29th (Worcestershire) Regiment of Foot and the 36th (Herefordshire) Regiment of Foot.

The 1st Battalion of the regiment was initially deployed to India, while the 2nd Battalion was initially deployed to Ireland, the Channel Islands, Malta, Bermuda and then Canada.

Both battalions were posted to South Africa during the Second Boer War, which began in October 1899. The 1st Battalion left the UK in March 1900 on board the Braemar Castle, and was primarily based at Ladybrand during the war. The 2nd Battalion saw heavy fighting near the Modder River.

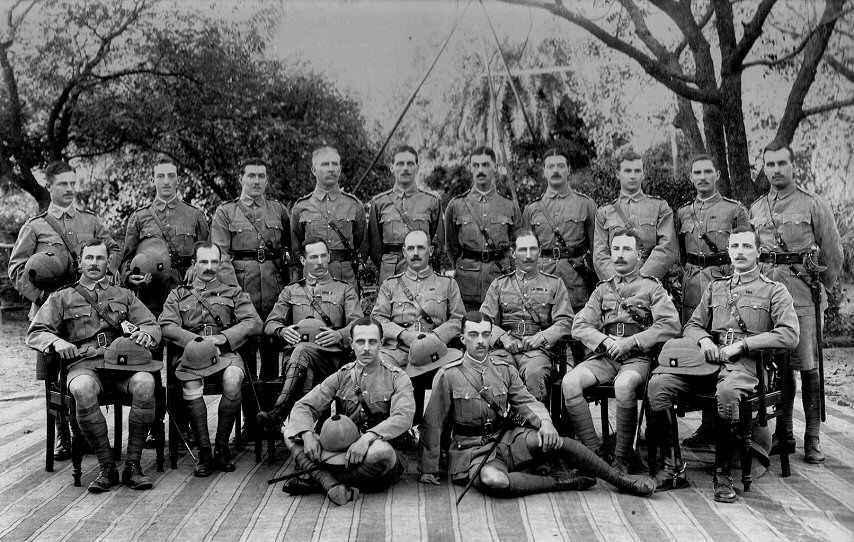
Officers of the 2nd Battalion, Worcestershire Regiment, at Jhansi, India, December 1911.

As the war in South Africa dragged on, a number of regiments containing large centres of population formed additional Regular battalions. The Worcestershire Regiment formed 3rd and 4th battalions in February 1900, when the existing militia battalions were relabeled as the 5th and 6th battalions. The 3rd and 4th (Militia) battalions, from 1900 renamed as the 5th and 6th battalions, were reserve battalions formed from the Worcester Militia in 1881. The 6th Battalion was embodied in May 1900, disembodied in October that year, and later re-embodied for service in South Africa during the Second Boer War.

About 615 officers and men returned to Southampton, Hampshire, on the SS Greek in early October 1902, several months on from the end of the war, when the battalion was disembodied at Worcester.

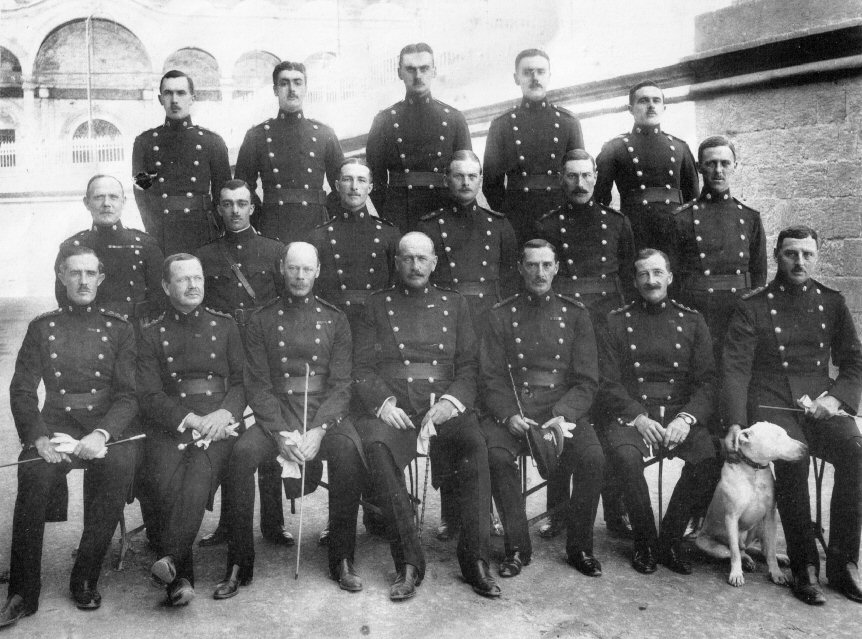
Officers of the 1st Worcesters in Egypt, 1914. Two future VC recipients, G. W. St. G. Grogan (front row, second from left, and a future colonel of the regiment) and F. C. Roberts (back row, centre), are among the officers shown. The battalion's commander, Lieutenant Colonel E. C. F. Wodehouse, who was to be killed in 1915, is in the centre of the front row.

In 1908, the Volunteers and Militia were reorganised nationally, with the former becoming the Territorial Force and the latter the Special Reserve; the regiment now had two Reserve and two Territorial battalions.

Troops from the Worcestershire Regiment shot dead two men during the Llanelli railway strike in August 1911.

=== First World War ===
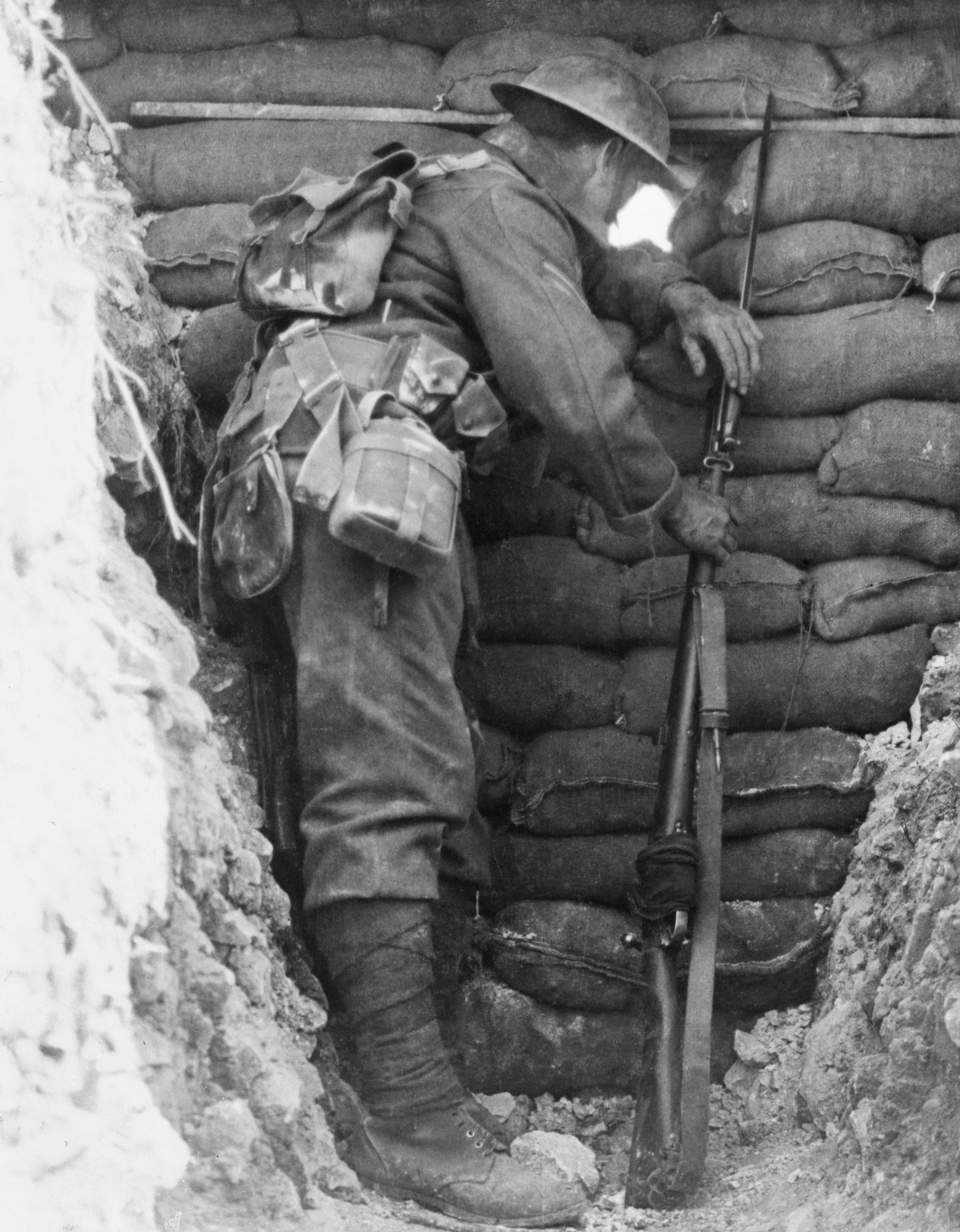
A sentry from the Worcestershire Regiment manning a position in France during 1916

During the First World War, members of the regiment were awarded nine Victoria Crosses, 70 Distinguished Service Orders (and 12 bars), 288 Military Crosses (and 36 bars), 227 Distinguished Conduct Medals (and 8 bars).

==== Regular Army ====
The 1st Battalion landed at Le Havre as part of the 24th Brigade in the 8th Division in November 1914 for service on the Western Front. The 1st Battalion played an important role at the Battle of Neuve Chapelle in March 1915 but lost their commanding officer, Lieutenant-Colonel E. C. F. Wodehouse, who was killed in action.

The 2nd Battalion landed at Boulogne-sur-Mer as part of the 5th Brigade in the 2nd Division August 1914 also for service on the Western Front. The 2nd Battalion captured the Chateau of Gheluvelt and held the line against overwhelming odds in October 1914 during the First Battle of Ypres and then took part in the allied victory at the Battle of St. Quentin Canal in September 1918.

The 3rd Battalion landed at Rouen as part of the 7th Brigade in the 3rd Division in August 1914 also for service on the Western Front. The 3rd Battalion saw action at the Battle of Messines in June 1917.

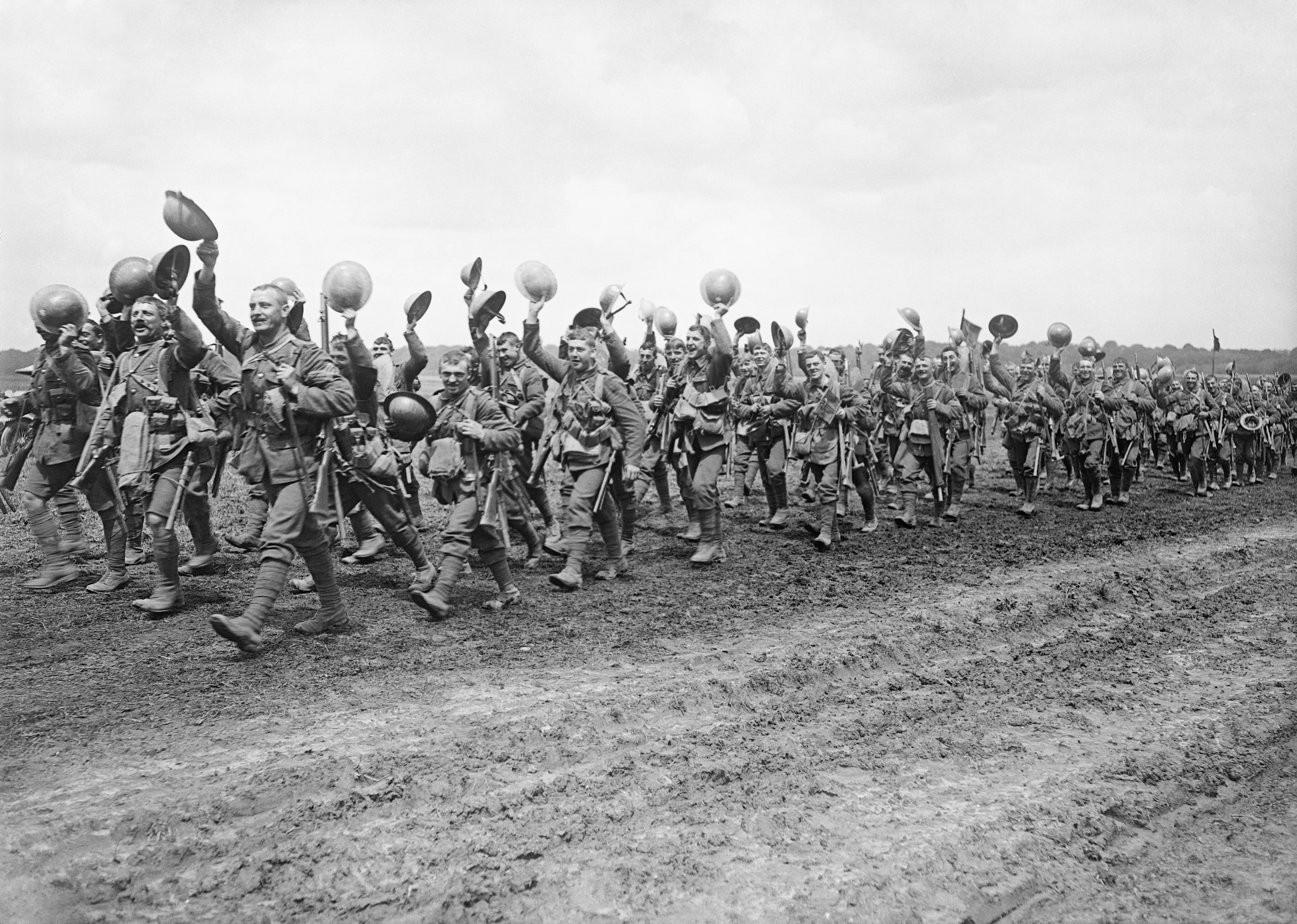
Men of the 4th Battalion, Worcestershire Regiment, marching to the trenches; Acheux-en-Amiénois, France, 27 June 1916.

The 4th Battalion landed in Gallipoli as part of the 88th Brigade in the 29th Division in March 1915; the battalion was evacuated from Gallipoli to Egypt in January 1916 and then landed at Marseille for service in on the Western Front in March 1916. The 4th Battalion then took part in the Battle of Le Transloy in October 1916.

==== Territorial Force ====
The 1/7th and 1/8th battalions landed at Boulogne-sur-Mer as part of the Gloucester and Worcester Brigade in the South Midland Division in March 1915 for service on the Western Front and then moved to Italy in November 1917.

The 2/7th and 2/8th battalions landed in France as part of the 2nd Gloucester & Worcester Brigade in the 2nd South Midland Division in May 1916 for service on the Western Front.

==== New Armies ====
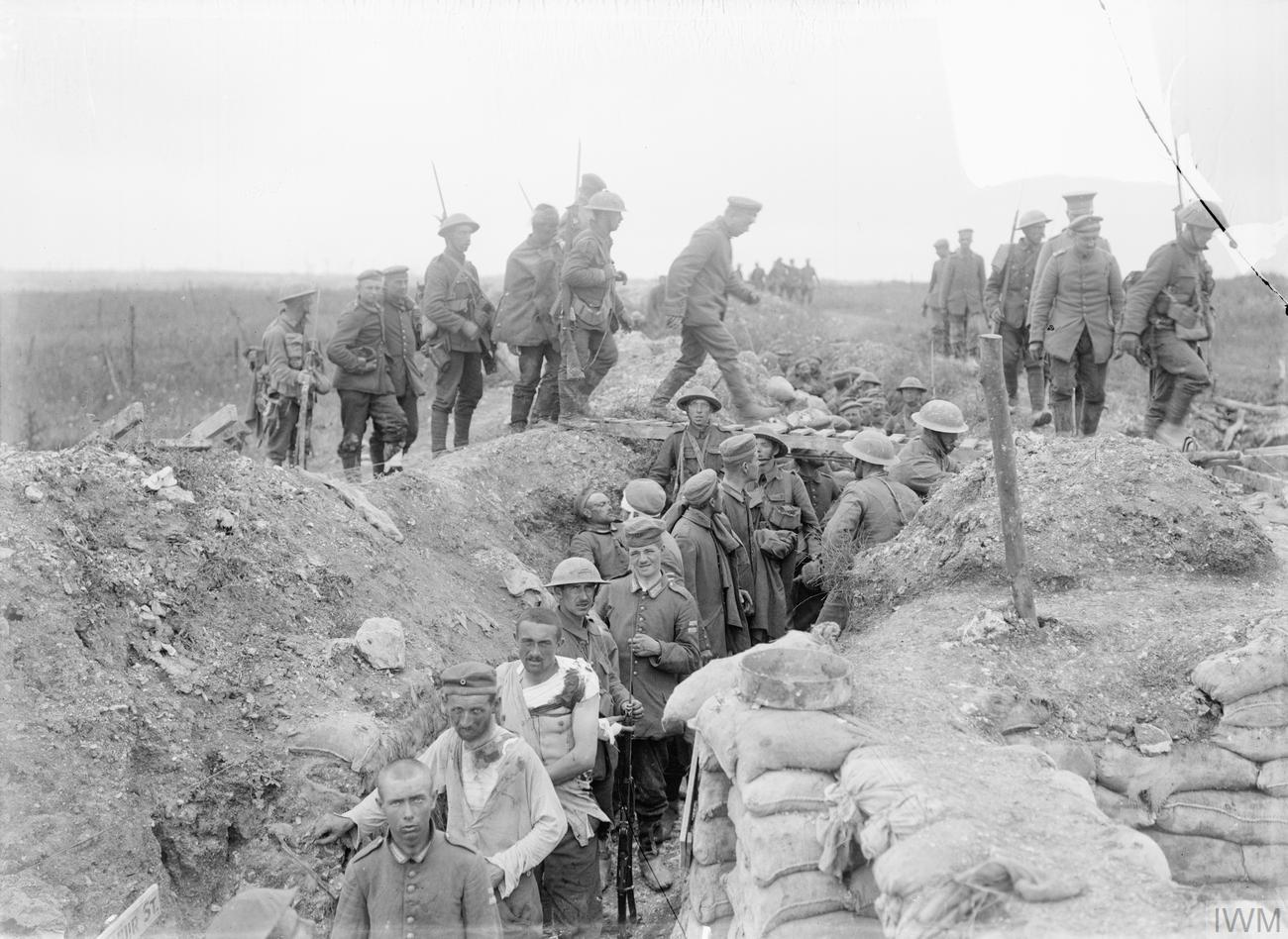
Escort of the 10th (Service) Battalion, Worcestershire Regiment, bringing in German prisoners captured during the attack on La Boisselle, France, 3 July 1916.

The 9th (Service) Battalion landed in Gallipoli as part of the 39th Brigade in the 13th (Western) Division in July 1915; the battalion was evacuated from Gallipoli and moved to Egypt in January 1916 and transferred to North Persia Force in July 1918.

The 10th (Service) Battalion landed in France as part of the 57th Brigade in the 19th (Western) Division in July 1915 for service on the Western Front.

The 11th (Service) Battalion landed in France as part of the 78th Infantry Brigade in the 26th Division in September 1915 for service on the Western Front and then moved to Salonika in November 1915.

=== After the war ===
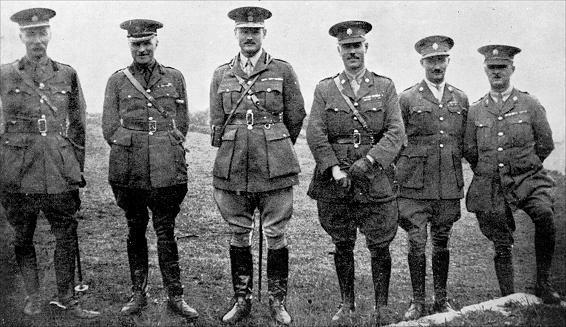
Officers of the 8th (Territorial Army) Battalion, Worcestershire Regiment, at Swanage, August 1924 for their annual training.

In December 1918, the regiment was used to suppress the Taranto Revolt, executing one of the rebels by firing squad.

The regiment's 2nd Battalion was part of the 1st Rhine Brigade of the British Army of the Rhine from 1926 to 1928.

The regiment fought in the 1936–1939 Arab revolt in Palestine.

=== Second World War ===
During the Second World War, 994 officers and other ranks of the Worcestershire Regiment were killed in action or died of their wounds, the average age being 26. However, the regiment was awarded 36 battle honours.

==== Regular Army ====
The 1st Battalion, Worcestershire Regiment was a Regular Army battalion that was stationed in the Middle East on the outbreak of the Second World War, having been stationed there since 1938 due to the 1936–39 Arab revolt in Palestine. On 7 September 1939, just four days after the outbreak of the war, Private Darby of the 1st Battalion died in Jerusalem of wounds he had sustained earlier in the year, the first British soldier to die in the war. The battalion was destined to see service in the Western Desert. In July 1940, the battalion was assigned to the 21st Infantry Brigade, serving alongside the 2nd Battalion, West Yorkshire Regiment and the 1st Battalion, Essex Regiment. On 11 October 1940, however, the brigade was redesignated 29th Indian Infantry Brigade, and the other two battalions of the brigade were replaced by two battalions from the Indian Army, the 3rd Battalion, 2nd Punjab Regiment and 6th Battalion, 13th Frontier Force Rifles. The brigade was assigned to the 5th Indian Infantry Division and saw service in the East African Campaign. On 22 June 1942, the battalion, still fighting in North Africa, surrendered, along with 30,000 other British Commonwealth troops, at Tobruk during the disastrous Battle of Gazala. Of the men of the original battalion, only 68 officers and men remained. The battalion was reformed in England by the redesignation of the 11th Battalion, a war service battalion raised in 1940.

The 2nd Battalion was also a Regular Army unit. On the outbreak of the Second World War in 1939, it was stationed in British India, where it had been since December 1936. However, for most of the early years of the war the battalion remained there on internal security duties until August 1942, several months after the Japanese Empire had entered the war, and there the battalion became part of the 64th Indian Infantry Brigade, serving alongside the 5th Battalion, 10th Baluch Regiment and 1st Battalion, 6th Queen Elizabeth's Own Gurkha Rifles, both battalions of the British Indian Army. The brigade was part of the 19th Indian Infantry Division, the "Dagger Division". The battalion operated in the Burma Campaign from 1944 to 1945, fighting the fanatical Imperial Japanese Army and were involved in the recapture of Mandalay.

==== Territorial Army ====
The 7th Battalion, Worcestershire Regiment was a 1st Line Territorial Army unit serving alongside the 8th Worcesters and 5th Battalion, Gloucestershire Regiment as part of the 144th Infantry Brigade, attached to the 48th (South Midland) Infantry Division. With the division, the battalion was sent overseas in early 1940 to join the British Expeditionary Force in France. Almost as soon as they arrived, however, the 7th Battalion were exchanged for the 2nd Battalion, Royal Warwickshire Regiment and became part of the 5th Infantry Brigade, 2nd Infantry Division. The battalion fought in the battles of Belgium and France and were forced to be evacuated to England after the German Army attempted to surround the BEF and cut it off from the French armies. After preparing for the German invasion of England that never came, the 2nd Division was sent to British India in April 1942, arriving in June. The 7th Battalion fought in the Burma Campaign and took part in the Battle of Kohima and the Battle of Imphal.

The 8th Battalion formed part of the 144th Infantry Brigade for most of the war. The battalion arrived in France during early 1940, and took part in the fighting in Belgium and France. During the retreat to Dunkirk, several of the battalion's men became separated and temporarily joined the 138th Infantry Brigade (of 46th Division) during the final fighting in France. At least 6 men from 'D' Company were killed in the Wormhoudt massacre, alongside other men from the 2nd Royal Warwickshire Regiment and 4th Cheshire Regiment, and men from the Royal Artillery. The battalion remained with the 144th Brigade, until it was transferred to the 211th Infantry Brigade in July 1944. As part of this brigade, the battalion served with the 80th Infantry (Reserve) Division and later the 38th Infantry (Reserve) Division.

Both the 9th and 10th battalions were formed in late August 1939, the 9th as a 2nd Line duplicate of the 7th Battalion, and the 10th a duplicate of the 8th. The 9th Battalion, formed from many former members of the 7th Battalion, was assigned to the 182nd Infantry Brigade, alongside the 2/7th and 9th battalions of the Royal Warwickshire Regiment, part of the 61st Infantry Division and remained in the United Kingdom throughout the war, as training battalions to supply drafts of replacements for battalions of other regiments overseas.

The 10th Battalion was, like the 9th, also made up of former members of the 8th Battalion and was assigned to the 183rd Infantry Brigade, alongside the 7th Battalion, Gloucestershire Regiment and 4th Battalion, Northamptonshire Regiment, also of the 61st Infantry Division. The service history of the 10th was much the same as with the 9th, both remaining in the United Kingdom throughout the war. However, in January 1944, while the Allies were training throughout England and preparing for the invasion of Normandy, the 10th Worcesters and 4th Northants both played an important part in the deception plan to fool the German Army.

==== Hostilities-only ====
The 11th Battalion, Worcestershire Regiment was raised in July 1940 at Norton Barracks from a small cadre of 150 officers and other ranks, most of them from the pre-war Regular Army. The battalion consisted mainly of men conscripted (or called up) straight from civilian for military service, with most of them coming from the Midlands. In October, the battalion joined the 213th Independent Infantry Brigade (Home), alongside the 13th Royal Warwickshire Regiment, 14th South Staffordshire Regiment and 9th Royal Berkshire Regiment. In December, the battalion left the brigade and transferred to become the motorised infantry element of the 9th Support Group, part of the newly created 9th Armoured Division. In June 1942, the Support Group was disbanded and the battalion transferred to 24th Independent Guards Brigade Group and later to the 33rd Independent Guards Brigade Group, where the standard of foot drill was very high. The Commanding Officer (CO) of the battalion, Lieutenant Colonel William Reginald Cox of the King's Shropshire Light Infantry, put forth a proposal to the War Office for the old 1st Battalion, which had been destroyed at Tobruk during the Battle of Gazala in June 1942, to be reformed around the 11th Battalion. The proposal was accepted and so, on 31 December 1942, the 11th Battalion was disbanded. On 1 January 1943, it was renumbered the 1st Battalion, during a parade which included the Colonel of the Regiment George Grogan VC and Field Marshal Claud Jacob. The reformed 1st Battalion transferred, in September 1943, to the 214th Infantry Brigade, 43rd (Wessex) Infantry Division, alongside the 5th Battalion, Duke of Cornwall's Light Infantry and 7th Battalion, Somerset Light Infantry. The battalion continued training in preparation for operations in North-Western Europe. Together with the rest of the 214th Brigade, the battalion landed in Normandy, as part of Operation Overlord, on 24 June 1944, and soon fought in Operation Epsom. On 18 November 1944, during Operation Clipper, the 1st Battalion, Worcestershire Regiment, moved across the Dutch-German border and commenced an attack on German soil to take the village of Tripsrath. Together with their parent unit, 214th Infantry Brigade, they were the first British troops to fight on German soil. Their job was to take the north-west side of Geilenkirchen to cover the left flank and support the American forces.

The 50th (Holding) Battalion was raised in Burton upon Trent on 1 June 1940 and, like with the 11th Battalion, originally consisted of three rifle companies of civilians conscripted for military service and a fourth formed from men returning from the Dunkirk evacuation. In October, it was redesignated as the 12th Battalion and became a standard infantry battalion. Most of its existence was spent guarding RAF airfields and alternating between home defence duties and training to repel a German invasion. In June 1941, the battalion was sent to Iceland, serving alongside the Territorial 49th (West Riding) Infantry Division. In September, the battalion transferred back to the United Kingdom and set for Milton Barracks, Gravesend, Kent. The Barracks was where the old 3rd Battalion had been disbanded in the 1920s. Soon after arrival, the battalion received the news from General Sir Bernard Paget, Commander-in-Chief, Home Forces that they were told they were going to be converted into gunners of the Royal Artillery. On 28 February 1942, the battalion was transferred to the Royal Artillery and converted into the 179th Field Regiment, Royal Artillery and served alongside the reformed 1st Battalion, previously the 11th Battalion, in the 43rd (Wessex) Division.

== After the war ==
The regiment was amalgamated with the Sherwood Foresters to form The Worcestershire and Sherwood Foresters Regiment (29th/45th Foot) in 1970.

The regiment fought in the Malayan Emergency.

== Museums and memorials ==
=== Gheluvelt Park ===
Gheluvelt Park in Worcester was opened on 17 June 1922 to commemorate the Worcestershire Regiment's 2nd Battalion after their part in Battle of Gheluvelt, a First World War battle that took place on 31 October 1914 in Gheluvelt (near Ypres), Belgium. The park was opened by Field Marshal John French, 1st Earl of Ypres, who stated, "on that day the 2nd Worcesters saved the British Empire." A plaque inside the park commemorates Captain Gerald Ernest Lea, who died on 15 September 1914 while commanding D. Company of the 2nd Battalion.

== Cultural significance ==
French academic Marcel Mauss developed his theory of "techniques of the body" after watching the Worcester Regiment unsuccessfully incorporate a French military band into its military parade during the First World War.

=== Regimental Museum ===
The Worcester Soldier galleries (for the Worcestershire Regiment and the Queen's Own Worcestershire Hussars) is part of the Worcester City Art Gallery & Museum

== Battle honours ==
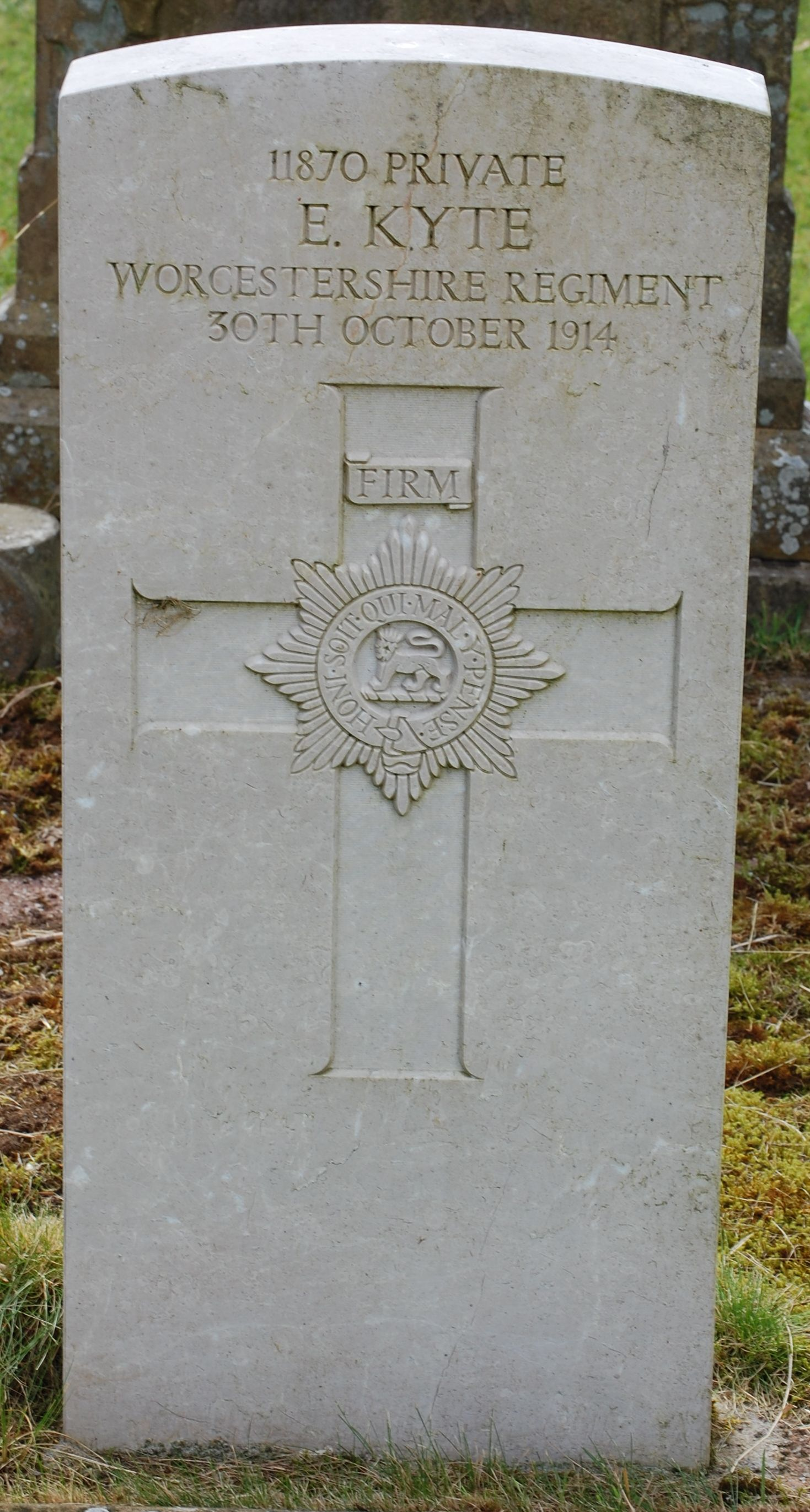
Grave of Pte. E Kyte of the Worcestershire Regiment, at St. Peter's Church, Little Aston, Staffordshire, England; showing the regimental badge.

The regiment's battle honours were as follows:

- From the 29th Regiment of Foot: Rolica, Vimiera, Talavera, Albuhera, Peninsula, Ferozeshah, Sobraon, Chillianwallah, Goojerat, Punjaub
- From the 36th Regiment of Foot: Hindoostan, Rolica, Vimiera, Corunna, Salamanca, Pyrenees, Nivelle, Nive, Orthes, Toulouse, Peninsula
- Ramillies, Bellisle, Ushant, Mysore, South Africa 1900–02
- The Great War (22 battalions): Mons, Le Cateau, Retreat from Mons, Marne 1914, Aisne 1914 ‘18, La Bassée 1914, Armentières 1914, Ypres 1914 '15 '17 '18, Langemarck 1914 '17, Gheluvelt, Nonne Bosschen, Neuve Chapelle, Aubers, Festubert 1915, Loos, Somme 1916 ‘18, Albert 1916, Bazentin, Delville Wood, Pozières, Le Transloy, Ancre Heights, Ancre 1916, Arras 1917, Scarpe 1917, Arleux, Messines 1917 '18, Pilckem, Menin Road, Polygon Wood, Broodseinde, Poelcappelle, Passchendaele, Cambrai 1917 ‘18, St. Quentin, Bapaume 1918, Rosières, Villers Bretonneux, Lys, Estaires, Hazebrouck, Bailleul, Kemmel, Scherpenberg, Hindenburg Line, Canal du Nord, St. Quentin Canal, Beaurevoir, Courtrai, Selle, Valenciennes, Sambre, France and Flanders 1914–18, Piave, Vittorio Veneto, Italy 1917–18, Doiran 1917 ‘18, Macedonia 1915–18, Helles, Landing at Helles, Krithia, Suvla, Sari Bair, Landing at Suvla, Scimitar Hill, Gallipoli 1915–16, Egypt 1916, Tigris 1916, Kut al Amara 1917, Baghdad, Mesopotamia 1916–18, Baku, Persia 1918
- The Second World War: Defence of Escaut, St. Omer-La Bassée, Wormhoudt, Odon, Bourguébus Ridge, Maltot, Mont Pincon, Jurques, La Varinière, Noireau Crossing, Seine 1944, Nederrijn, Geilenkirchen, Rhineland, Goch, Rhine, North-West Europe 1940 '44–45, Gogni, Barentu, Keren, Amba Alagi, Abyssinia 1940–41, Gazala, Via Balbia, North Africa 1941–42, Kohima, Relief of Kohima, Naga Village, Mao Songsang, Shwebo, Mandalay, Irrawaddy, Mt. Popa, Burma 1944–45
- 7th Battalion: South Africa 1900–01
