= Suffolk Fortress Royal Engineers =

Suffolk Fortress Royal Engineers 584 (Suffolk) Field Company, RE
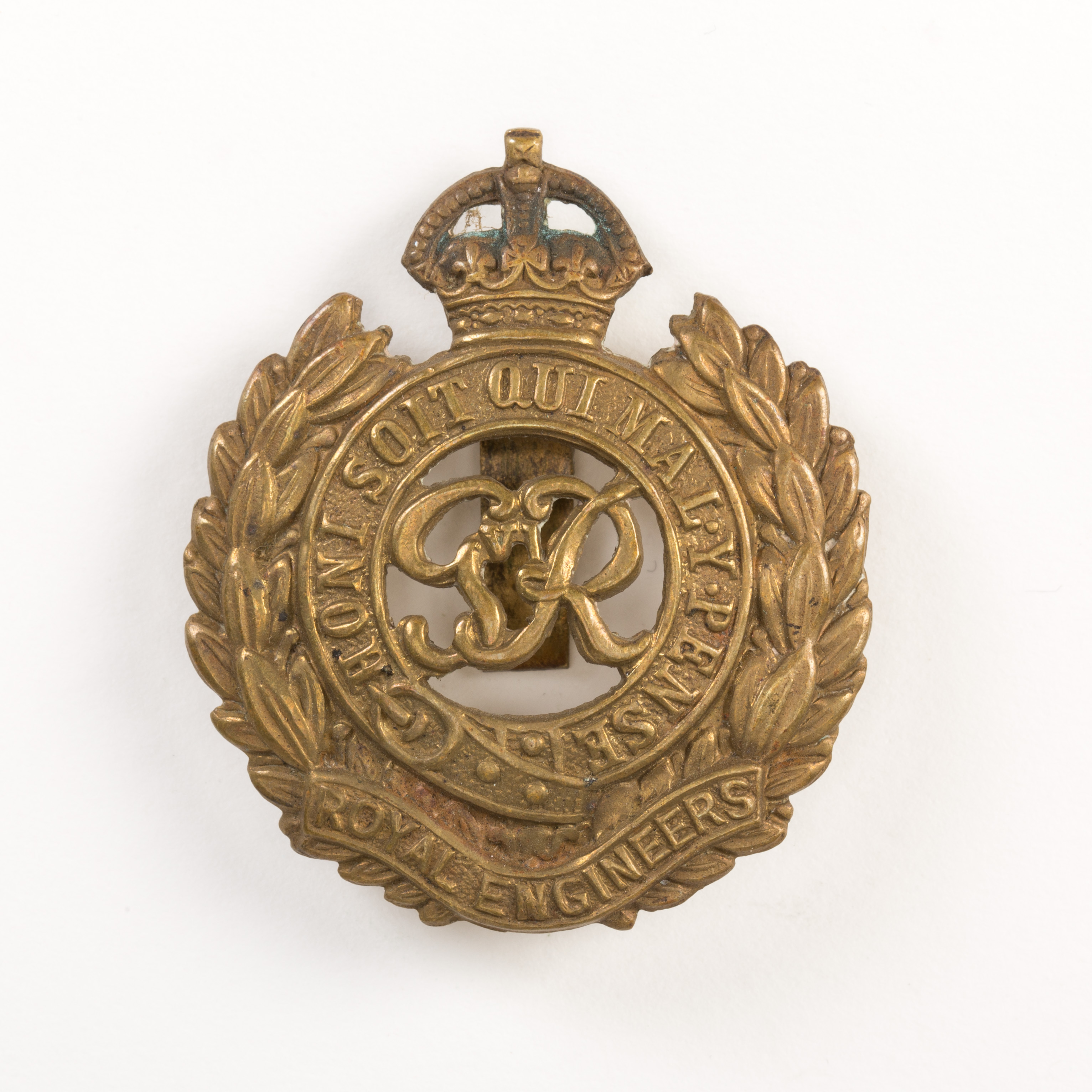
- RE Cap badge (King George VI cipher)
- Active: 1938–1967
- Country: United Kingdom
- Branch: Territorial Force
- Role: Fortress engineers Field engineers
- Part of: 15th (Kent) GHQ Troops RE
- Garrison/HQ: Ipswich
- Engagements: Operation Overlord; Seine crossing Operation Plunder

The Suffolk Fortress Royal Engineers was a coast defence unit of Britain's Territorial Army formed in the 1930s. During World War II it changed roles and specialised in bridgebuilding and rafting to help 21st Army Group cross the numerous water obstacles encountered during the campaign in North West Europe. It continued in the post-war TA until 1967.

== Origin ==
The unit was formed as part of the Royal Engineers (RE) in November 1932, when Commander V.M. Cooper, DSO, Royal Navy (retired), was commissioned as Major and Officer Commanding. It consisted of No 1 (Electric Light and Works) Company at Portman Road, Ipswich, tasked with operating electrical generators and searchlights (S/Ls) at Landguard Fort and Beacon Hill, Dovercourt, defending the ports of Harwich and Felixstowe.

== World War II ==
=== Mobilisation ===
The unit mobilised on 24 August 1939, shortly before the outbreak of war, and its first tasks were to establish Links Battery in holiday bungalows at Gorleston and to collect searchlights from the railway station and install them in the batteries.

=== 584 (Suffolk) Army Field Company ===
In May 1940 it was decided to transfer responsibility for S/L provision to the Royal Artillery (RA) and a few of the Suffolk Fortress Engineers transferred to the RA. The rest of the unit became 584 (Suffolk) Army Field Company, RE, at Milton Barracks, Gravesend. By September it had joined companies from the Kent Fortress Royal Engineers to form Kent Corps Troops Royal Engineers (CTRE), later III (Kent) CTRE.

The new unit moved to Northern Ireland for training. Detachments of the Kent Fortress Engineers had already been used to destroy oil installations on the Continent during the Dunkirk evacuation to deny them to the advancing Germans; now 584 Fd Co trained for raids on enemy-held territory in Italy, but these operations were cancelled. Instead, the unit developed techniques for rafting tanks across rivers. III (Kent) CTRE returned to England in July 1942 and became 1st (Kent) GHQ Troops RE, assigned to First Army. However, it did not accompany First Army to North Africa in Operation Torch.

==== Normandy ====
In the spring of 1943 the Kent CTRE was redesignated 15th (Kent) GHQ Troops RE and reassigned to 21st Army Group for the planned invasion of Normandy (Operation Overlord). It trained in building heavy bridges, and also in assembling Naval Pontoon Causeways to provide firm roads over soft beaches and to provide 'dryshod' landings for disembarking vehicles. Although delayed by storms, the sappers had some of these causeways operating by 11 June 1944 (five days after D Day) and steady steam of vehicles and stores was coming ashore.

==== Vernon Bridge ====
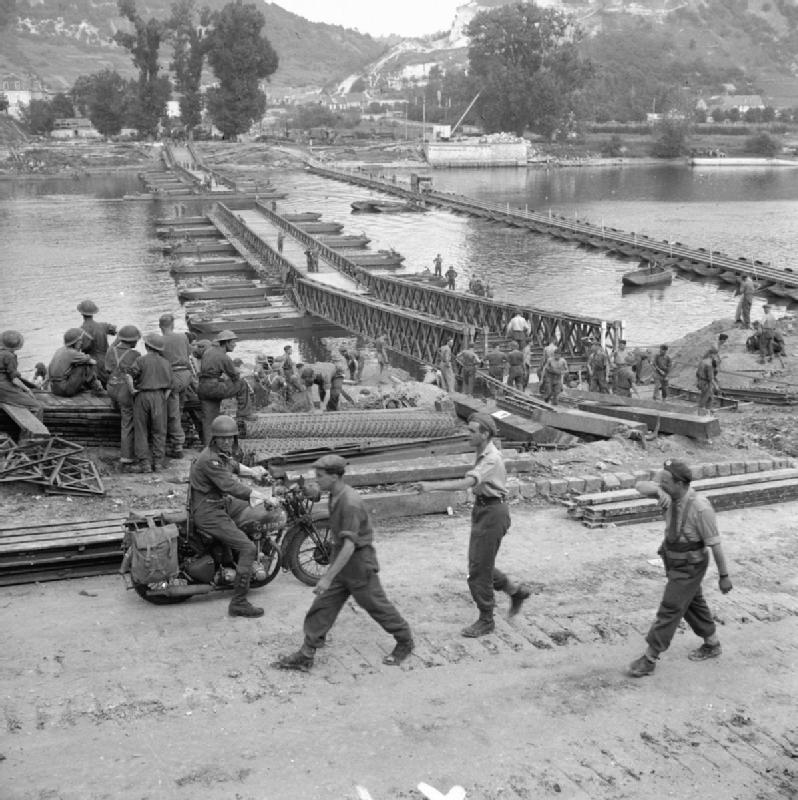
Bridges laid at Vernon, 28 August 1944

After 21st Army Group broke out from the Normandy beachhead, 15th (Kent) GHQTRE was assigned to 43rd (Wessex) Infantry Division for the assault crossing of the River Seine at Vernon. While the Kent companies took part in the infantry assault that established a bridgehead on 25 August, the rest of the unit with the heavy equipment was held up on the road 30 miles (48 km) away. The vital one and half platoons of 584 (Suffolk) Fd Co with the tank rafting material did not arrive at the river's edge until 21.00 on 26 August and struggled to get a tank ferry into operation before morning on the 27th. Once the bridgehead was secure, the Kent REs' next task in this complex operation was to build a 223-metre Bailey bridge, codenamed 'Saul', in 36 hours. When 15th (Kent) GHQTRE and other bridging units had completed their tasks, 43rd Division and its supporting armour crossed in strength on 28 August and began 21st Army Group's rapid advance to Brussels.

==== Nijmegen ====
After the failure of Operation Market Garden, the vital road and rail bridges that had been captured at Nijmegen were damaged by German swimmers who attached mines to the piers. A hole was blown in the roadway of the road bridge, but was swiftly repaired by the insertion of two Bailey spans by 15th (Kent) GHQTRE and XXX CTRE; the bridges were also camouflaged.

==== Operation Plunder ====
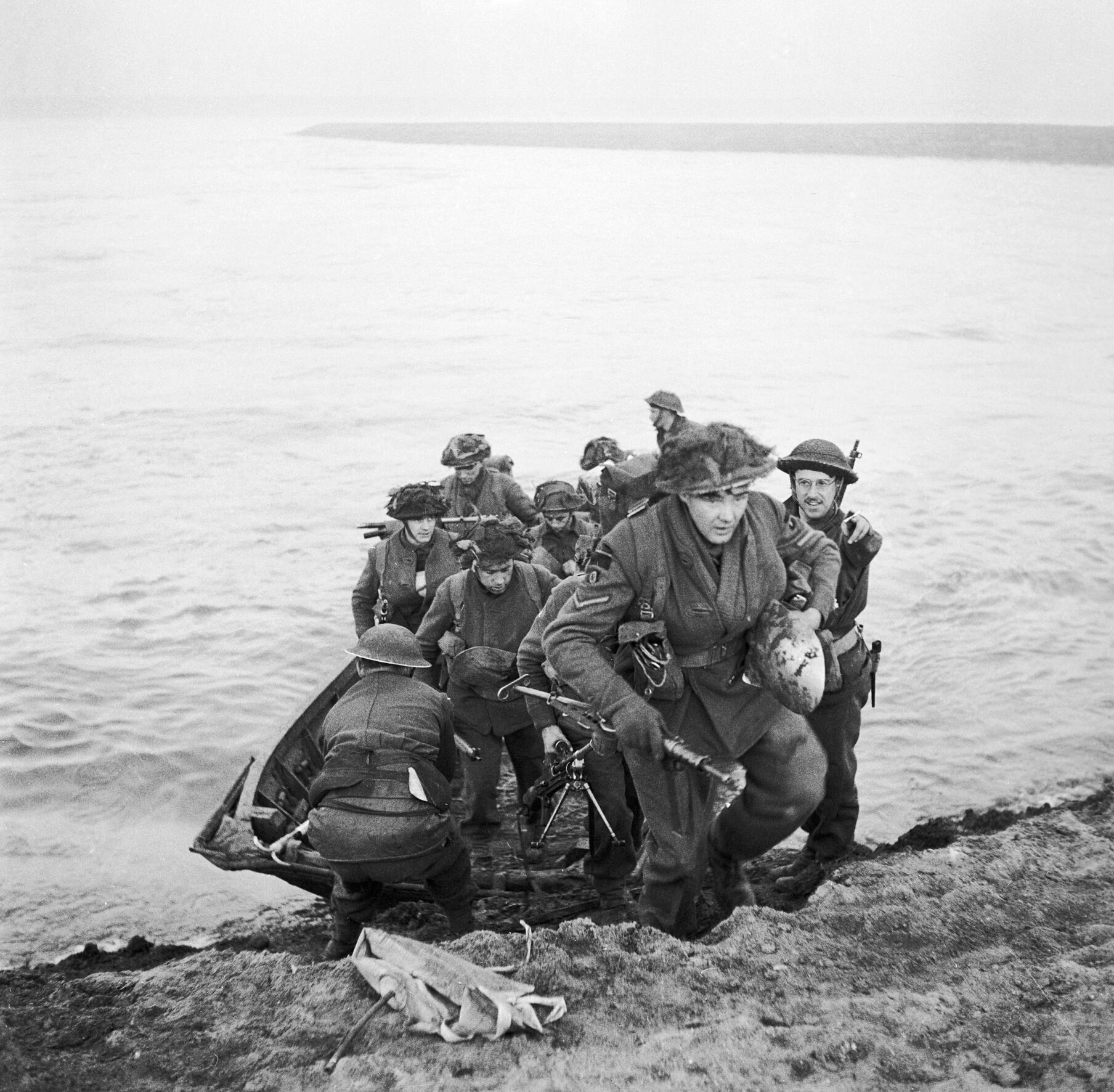
Men of 15th Scottish Division crossing the Rhine by stormboat on 24 March 1945.

Early in 1945, in order to improve the lines of communication for the planned assault crossing of the Rhine (Operation Plunder), additional bridges were constructed over the Maas at Venlo. 15th (Kent) GHQTRE was responsible for a 1220-foot (370 m) all-weather Class 40 Bailey pontoon bridge. The unit was then assigned to XII Corps for Operation Plunder itself, controlling all engineering work for the assault crossing by 44th (Lowland) Brigade of 15th (Scottish) Division near Xanten on the night of 23/24 March 1945 (Operation Torchlight). The first wave of infantry crossed at 02.00 aboard Buffalo tracked landing vehicles; once it was known that this crossing had been successful, the Kent RE field companies manned stormboats to ferry infantry across. At 03.30, rafting equipment was moved down to the river bank on sledges and by 06.30 the unit had two of these in operation (two others were destroyed by shellfire before they could be completed and had to be replaced later from reserves). The RE History records that the rafting troops received an unsolicited testimonial for their watermanship from a captured German officer who was being ferried back. Afterwards, 584 (Suffolk) Fd Co assisted in building 'Sparrow' bridge across the Rhine at Xanten, named after Sapper Sparrow who was drowned during its construction.

==== Bremen ====
After Bremen had been captured on 27 April, 15th (Kent) GHQTRE built a barge bridge with Bailey superstructure to link the two halves of the city. All German forces facing 21st Army Group surrendered at Lüneburg Heath on 4 May, but there were many months of bridgebuilding and reconstruction work before the troops could be demobilised. 584 (Suffolk) Fd Co was moved from Bremen to Münster to clear destroyed railway bridges from the Dortmund–Ems Canal so that food supply routes could be opened up for the German civilians.

15th (Kent) GHQTRE and its companies were disbanded on 10 June 1946.

== Postwar ==
When the TA was reconstituted in 1947, the Suffolk RE unit was reformed at Ipswich as the independent 584 Field Squadron, RE. In 1961 it was redesignated 251 Field Park Squadron, RE, and assigned to 54th (East Anglian) Division/District. When the TA was reduced into the Territorial and Army Volunteer Reserve (TAVR) in 1967 the squadron was disbanded, with 54th Division/District RE forming a cadre within the Essex Yeomanry.

== External sources ==
- BBC People's War.
- British Army units from 1945 on
