= Wyldbore-Smith =

Wyldbore-Smith or the unhyphenated equivalent, Wyldbore Smith, is an English surname. Notable people with the surname include:

- Brian Wyldbore-Smith (1913–2005), British Army general
- Edmund Charles Wyldbore Smith (1877–1938), British civil servant, diplomat, and businessman
