= Kent Fortress Royal Engineers =

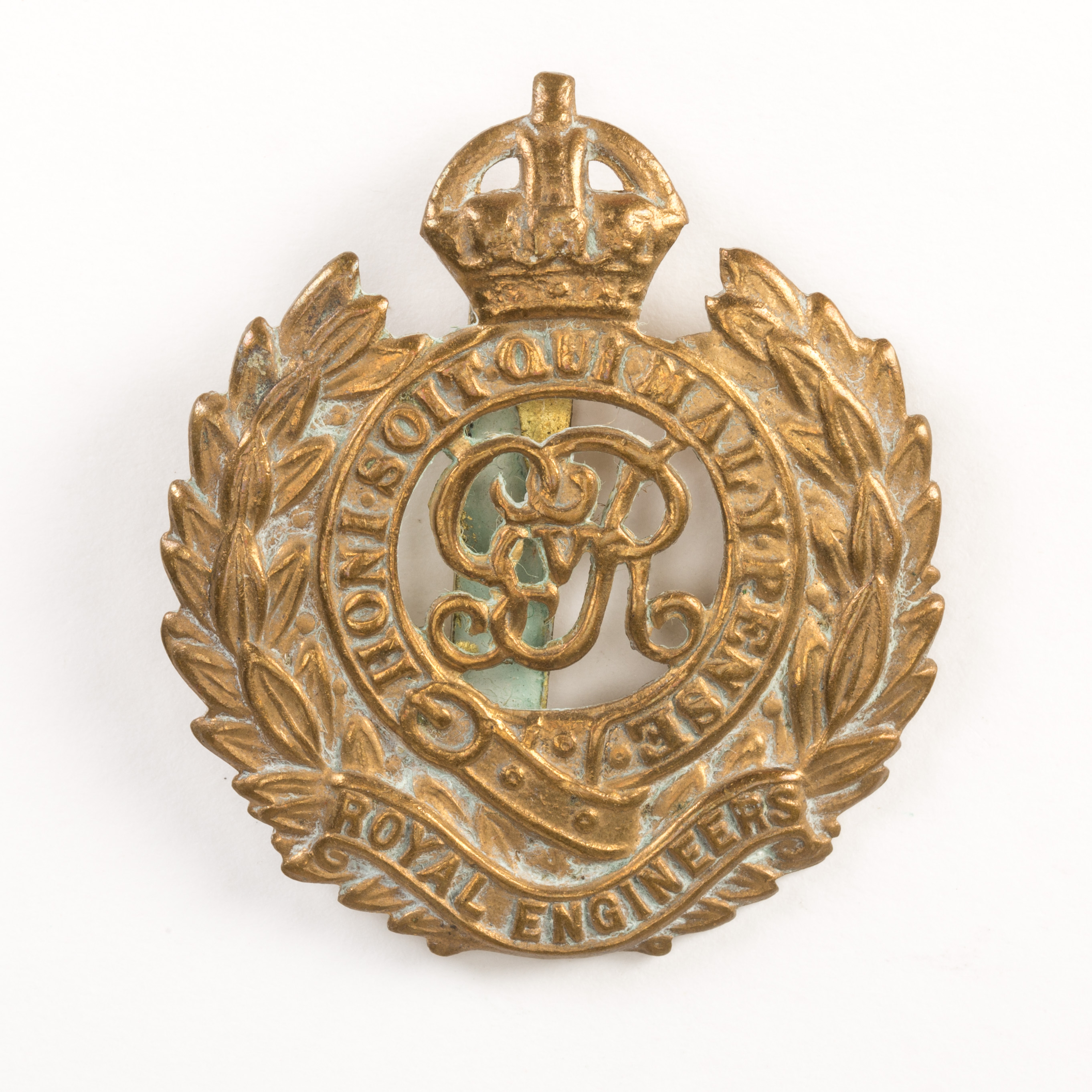
- RE Cap badge (King George V cipher)
- Active: 1908–1919; 1932–1946; 1947–1967
- Country: United Kingdom
- Branch: Territorial Army
- Role: Coast Defence; Field Engineering; Assault rafting Bomb disposal
- Garrison/HQ: Chatham, Kent
- Engagements: World War I: Gallipoli; Sinai and Palestine; Western Front; World War II: France; Greece; Syria; Normandy

Commanders
- Colonel of the Regiment: Sir David Salomons, 2nd Baronet
- Notable commanders: Clifford Brazier

The Kent Fortress Royal Engineers (KFRE) was a volunteer Territorial unit of the British Army that saw service in both World Wars. They are notable for their successful actions in May 1940, when they destroyed substantial oil stocks and installations just ahead of the German advance, and in August 1944, during the assault crossing of the River Seine.

== Origin ==
When the Territorial Force was created in 1908, the 1st Sussex Royal Engineers (Volunteers) were split up to provide the Kent and Sussex Fortress Engineers, as well as the field companies of the Home Counties Division. The Kent Fortress Royal Engineers was formed on the basis of K Company of the 1st Sussex at Tonbridge.

By the outbreak of World War I, the Kent unit had the following organisation:

- HQ at Drill Hall, Chatham
- No 1 Works Company at Tonbridge
- No 2 Works Company at Drill Hall, Ashford
- No 3 Works Company at Southborough
- No 4 Electric Light Company at Submarine Mining School, Gillingham
- No 5 Electric Light Company at Gravesend
- No 6 Works Company at Southborough
- No 7 Works Company at Southborough

The Honorary Colonel was Sir David Salomons, 2nd Baronet

== World War I ==
=== Mobilisation ===
Shortly after the outbreak of war on 4 August 1914, TF units were invited to volunteer for overseas service. Meanwhile, the formation of a reserve or 2nd Line unit was authorised for each 1st Line unit where 60 per cent or more of the men had volunteered for Overseas Service. The titles of these 2nd Line units would be the same as the original, but distinguished by a '2/' prefix. All the KFRE units were initially employed on the Thames Estuary defences, but, in June 1915, 1/1st–1/3rd Works Companies left and were converted to Field Companies for service overseas; 1/6th and 1/7th Companies also formed field companies that served in home defence. 4th and 5th EL Companies appear to have remained in the Thames defences throughout the war.

=== 1st Kent Fortress Field Company ===
In June 1915, this company left, embarking for the Gallipoli on 23 September. On arrival at Suvla Bay, on 7 October, it was attached to the 2nd Mounted Division. The division was evacuated to Egypt in December and broken up in January 1916. The field company was then attached to 54th (East Anglian) Division in the Suez Canal defences on 1 July. The company was redesignated 495th (1st Kent) Field Company on 1 February 1917. In March, it advanced with 54th Division into Palestine and fought in the First and Second Battle of Gaza. It joined 75th Division on 7 August 1917 and served with it during the Third Battle of Gaza but returned to the 54th in May 1918 when the 75th was partly Indianised. 495th Company remained with 54th Division for the final advance in Palestine (the Battle of Megiddo). 495th Company was demobilised during 1919.

=== 2nd Kent Fortress Field Company ===
1/2nd Field company also embarked on 23 September and joined 2nd Mounted Division at Suvla. After evacuation to Egypt, it was posted to the Suez Canal defences, took part in the Senussi campaign, and was redesignated 496th (2nd Kent) Field Company on 1 February 1917. It joined the newly formed 74th (Yeomanry) Division on 24 March 1917. On 25 May, the company was transferred to 53rd (Welsh) Division and then transferred again on 4 July to 75th Division. Unlike 495 Company, it remained with 75th Division until the end of the war, operating alongside two companies of Queen Victoria's Own Madras Sappers & Miners of the Indian Army. 496th Company began demobilisation in February 1919.

=== 3rd Kent Fortress Field Company ===
The 1/3rd Field Company was largely recruited from Tonbridge and the surrounding villages.

==== HMS Hythe disaster ====
On 13 October 1915, the company left its depot at Gillingham and proceeded to Devonport, where it boarded the troopship Scotian bound for Gallipoli via Mudros. On arrival at Mudros, on 27 October, the troops were transferred to the auxiliary minesweeper HMS Hythe to be landed at Suvla Bay the following morning. In the early hours of 28 October, the Hythe was involved in a collision with the much larger troopship Sarnia. The Hythe sank within minutes, taking down most of its crew and passengers. The company lost its Officer Commanding, Capt D.R. Salomons (only son and heir of the honorary colonel), and 128 other ranks, almost all recruited from the Tonbridge area. The survivors (4 officers and 78 other ranks) were picked up by the Sarnia and returned to Mudros.

On 20 November, the company (now reduced to 4 officers and 78 other ranks) re-embarked and landed the same day at Cape Helles, where it was attached to 52nd (Lowland) Division.

==== Western Front ====
On the night of 7/8 January 1916, 52nd Division was evacuated from Helles and withdrawn to Egypt. Here the 3rd Kent Field Company transferred to the 29th Division, which proceeded to the Western Front in March. On the first day of the Battle of the Somme the company was attached to one of the attacking brigades, but continuing work on communications and water supply meant that only a small portion of the company went into action. The company participated in the Battles of Arras and 3rd Ypres in 1917. On the morning of 30 November 1917, when the Germans counterattacked after the Battle of Cambrai, the company was sleeping in a tunnel at the brewery at Les Rue Vertes after a hard night's work. The company was taken by surprise and captured. The reformed company served at the Battle of the Lys (1918), and finally the Hundred Days Offensive. It became 497th (3rd Kent) Field Company on 1 February 1917, and had been disbanded by mid-March 1919.

=== 1/6th and 1/7th Kent Fortress Companies ===
With the further expansion of the army, the Kent Fortress RE organised the 1/6th and 1/7th Kent Fortress Companies to which the Cinque Ports Fortress Royal Engineers also contributed personnel. In late 1916, the 1/6th and 1/7th were converted to field companies and had joined 73rd Division by 22 November. 73rd Division was a newly organised Home Service formation concentrating at Blackpool. Once organised, the division moved in January 1917 into Essex and Hertfordshire to form part of Southern Army (Home Forces); the engineers were stationed at Witham and Chelmsford. The two field companies were numbered 546th (1/6th Kent) and 547th (1/7th Kent) in February 1917.

73rd Division's main role was to train and physically condition men for drafting as reinforcements for units serving overseas. By the end of 1917, the division's infantry battalions had largely completed their task and been replaced by training units, whereupon the division was broken up as a Home Defence formation. 546th and 547th Field Companies were redesignated Army Troops Companies and embarked for the Western Front on 22 June 1918, landing at Le Havre the following day, and working in the Third Army and Fourth Army areas respectively from 7 July.

The two companies were engaged in engineering works associated with the rapid advance of the British Expeditionary Force in the final months of the war. 546 Company had transferred to Fourth Army by the time of the Armistice, while 547 Company moved to VI Corps in September and to Third Army by November 1918.

546th and 547th Army Field Companies were disbanded in France on 4 June 1919 and 1 May 1919 respectively.

=== Second and Third Lines ===
The 2/1st, 2/2nd, 2/3rd, 3/1st, 3/2nd and 3/3rd Kent Fortress Companies later formed a holding and training company, which was numbered 499th (Home Counties) Field Company (alternatively referred to as 499th (Kent) Reserve Company).

2/6th Company later became 579th (Kent) Works Company, while 2/7th Company became an HQ and Deport company for the KFRE, and was later numbered as 580th (Thames & Medway) Fortress Company.

2/4th Company became 598th (Kent) Works Company, later 598th (Thames & Medway) Works Company, and after the remaining TF personnel had been demobilised in 1919 was used to reform the Regular Army 39th Fortress Company, RE, at Sheerness. The Kent Fortress Royal Engineers may also have been the parent for 599th (Thames & Medway) Fortress Company.

== Interwar ==
The Kent Fortress RE was not reformed in the Territorial Army immediately after the war, but was recreated in 1932 by Major (later Brigadier) Clifford Brazier, the works manager of Bevans Cement Works (later Blue Circle Cement Company) at Northfleet, and largely recruited from his employees.

The new unit consisted of Nos 1, 2 and 3 Electric Light and Works Companies. Personnel from the KFRE appear to have provided the basis for 347 (Kent) Anti-Aircraft Searchlight Company, RE, formed at Sidcup in 29th (Kent) Anti-Aircraft Battalion, RE, in October 1937. In April 1939, 347 Company became part of (and gave its name to) a new 73rd (Kent Fortress) AA Battalion.

== World War II ==
=== Mobilisation ===
On the outbreak of war in 1939, one of the war stations of the Northfleet Section was to man the 120 cm searchlights at Coalhouse Fort at East Tilbury on the north bank of the Thames Estuary. These new remote-controlled 'fighting lights' installed on the north Caponier of the fort were powered by Hornsby engines and enabled the fort's 6-inch coast defence guns to fire at night. Anti-aircraft searchlights were also installed at the fort.

=== XD operations ===
Germany started the War with her access to oil critical to her plans. Her annual supply was 44 million barrels and over 90% was imported, 60% from outside Europe. Her peak stocks, immediately before the invasion of Russia only reached 56 million barrels. Thus, at the outbreak of war, British strategic planning saw the importance of denying to the Germans the 20 million barrels (two and a half million tons) of oil sitting in refineries in France and the Low Countries. The task was allocated to the divisional engineers of 12th Division(TA) as early as September 1939. That unit was sent to France, however, with its division so the role was belatedly transferred to the KFRE, in April 1940, requiring a field company to carry out tasks for which regimental strength had been planned.

Three small parties of the KFRE were kept at two hour notice to cover the principal installations in Amsterdam, Rotterdam and Flushing. Each detachment was to operate under naval command, with tasks to KFRE, unusually, coming direct from the Army's Director of Military Operations. The whole programme was named the "XD Operations".

In the early hours of 10 May 1940, the German Army invaded the Netherlands and Belgium. That morning three destroyers set out carry out their missions at those locations. The KFRE party focused on Amsterdam arrived at Ymuiden after their destroyer had been hit by the Luftwaffe and travelled to Amsterdam on a special train. Negotiations with local commanders dragged on for days while armed clashes with German paratroopers and local Nazi sympathisers took place until eventually on 17th Captain Keble was able to carry out the task, which involved blowing holes in the tanks and then setting light to the escaping oil pooled around them.

The parallel operations at Rotterdam and Antwerp, were also successful and the detachment at Rotterdam also assisted with the evacuation of 40 tons of Dutch gold.The former party also saw a great deal of the Luftwaffe.

The German advance continued into France, and KFRE were sent to destroy the oil depots along the lower Seine. Initial, but understandable, French reluctance dissipated as the Germans reached the area, and all the installations from Le Havre to Paris were destroyed. In addition, a large British military fuel dump near Saint-Nazaire was destroyed, but British high command ordered that no demolition was to be done at a refinery at Donges, also near Saint-Navaire; the supplies were subsequently thought to have been used to re-fuel U-boats.

Detachments were later sent to destroy smaller depots at Dunkirk, Boulogne and Calais. These were abortive, however; those at Dunkirk were destroyed by German bombs, Calais' facilities were unapproachable due to the heavy fighting and Boulogne, in fact, had none.

Further oil demolition operations were attempted at Caen, Cherbourg and St Malo, but only St Malo was successful. The installations near Caen were captured before the British arrival, and the French authorities prevented demolition at Cherbourg; KFRE assisted with the general harbour demolitions there.

Although these actions remained secret at the time, there was official appreciation. The KFRE became the most highly decorated company-sized unit in the British Army in the war to date. Major Brazier received an OBE, three officers (Captains Robert Keeble, Thomas Frederick Goodwin and Bernard Buxton) received DSOs, Second Lieutenant Bernard John Ashwell received the MC. A DCM was awarded to Corporal John Thomas Hearnden and three NCOs (Staff Sergeant Albert Henry Smart, Sergeant Alfred Richard Blake and Corporal Jack Mitten) received Military Medals.

During the British evacuations from western France (Operation Aerial), the final KFRE detachment lost seven men on the Lancastria when it was sunk at St Nazaire. One more went "missing, presumed dead" during the destruction of the British dump near St Nazaire and another died of wounds sustained at Boulogne.

The success of the XD Operations in destroying three quarters of those stocks in the few critical weeks before and after the evacuation at Dunkirk was recognised in the War Office as a rare triumph at a difficult time. General Sir Richard Gale – then a staff colonel - remarked, “The tragedy of these events [the fall of France] was for us, however, off-set to some extent by the exploits of a Territorial unit, the Kent Fortress Royal Engineers.”

=== Kirkuk ===
There was concern that the Germans might attempt to capture the large British-owned oilfield at Kirkuk in northern Iraq. Although far from the war zones, the Germans were interested in the region. There were pro-Nazi factions in Iraqi politics, German aircraft had reached Baghdad via Vichy Syria (see Anglo-Iraqi War), and some German special forces had been planning to establish bases in the Kirkuk area using aircraft from Kampfgeschwader 200, a specialist unit.

An officer from the KFRE was despatched there with some urgency to review the situation. Apart from three wells needed to supply the British Eastern Fleet, all the wells were filled with concrete and drilling rigs were removed. Local management had already made adequate plans to render the pipelines useless to the enemy.

=== Expansion ===
In September 1940, the KFRE was organised into 582 and 583 Army Field Companies and joined by 584 (from the Suffolk Fortress RE) and 297 Field Park Company (a London RE unit) to form Kent Corps Troops Royal Engineers (CTRE). After helping the construction of coastal defences against the anticipated German invasion, and clearing up and making safe bomb damage in London, the new unit was moved to a camp near Portadown, Northern Ireland as III (Kent) CTRE. The time was spent on training exercises and assisting in Belfast after the city had been bombed. Opportunities were taken – out of uniform – to spend weekend leave in Dublin, in neutral Ireland, and sample peacetime life.

=== Spitsbergen ===
The Norwegian northern islands of Spitsbergen were inhabited by Russian and Norwegian miners who exploited the rich coal seams there. A party of four officers and 30 other ranks from III CTRE was sent as part of Operation Gauntlet to destroy the coal mines and stockpiles and deny their use to the Germans.

=== Gibraltar ===
A party of nine left for Gibraltar under the command of Major Paul Baker, with three subalterns, Lieutenants Meyler, Terry, and Wells and five NCOs. Their mission was to advise and train the Gibraltar garrison in the techniques of destroying bulk fuel installations. The officers and NCOs spent four months at Gibraltar training local sappers in the destruction of oil storage. This was a preparation for any German threat to capture "the Rock".

=== Greece ===
In response to the axis invasion of Greece, at the end of 1940, a KFRE company was sent to Greece to assist with preparations for allied troops, train Greek army officers in demolition techniques, and carry out demolitions themselves. The first task on arrival was, however, to prepare camps for incoming British troops.

The engineers were transferred to Salonika and Volos and, when the Germans reached the city, successfully demolished installations of use to the enemy, including oil refineries, engineering works, gas works, port facilities and fortifications at Volos. Outside Athens, a new airfield and its equipment was destroyed. Some members of the RE detachment were lost, as casualties or captured, before the bulk were evacuated to Crete, where others were captured or killed when the Germans invaded. One captured officer (Dennis Alabaster) escaped while being transported through Yugoslavia and joined the Chetniks; he was subsequently killed there.

=== Middle East ===
Those who escaped Crete were then based in Palestine. A detachment was employed during the allied invasion of Vichy Syria in July 1941: during this operation a two-man team was flown behind Vichy lines, where they destroyed a vital bridge and were recovered by aircraft.

Once absorbed into the local military organisation, they assisted with the wide variety of tasks performed by the Royal Engineers: construction and destruction, booby trap and mine clearance (often under fire), water supply, construction of dummy installations to deceive the enemy, etc.

=== Parachute Squadrons ===
The newly formed British airborne units required sapper support. The first Sapper airborne unit was the Air Troop RE, with KFRE providing the first commander, Captain, subsequently Major, Stephen Dorman and a detachment of soldiers to provide the nucleus for it. Expanded to become 1st parachute Squadron, Major Dorman took it to North Africa where he was killed.

In early 1942, one of the companies in Northern Ireland, commanded by Major Paul Baker, was selected for conversion to this role, subject to the willingness and suitability of individual sappers - all in fact volunteered. The company became 2nd parachute Squadron.

=== Normandy ===
Meanwhile, the bulk of III (Kent) CTRE had returned from Northern Ireland in July 1942, being redesignated 1st (Kent) General Headquarters Troops RE. Although assigned to First Army, they did not take part in Operation Torch, and in 1943 they were renamed again as 15th (Kent) GHQ Troops RE. The unit accompanied 21st Army Group to Normandy as part of Operation Overlord.

15th (Kent) GHQTRE under the command of Lt-Col L.R.E. Fayle was assigned to I Corps for the assault phase of the operation. The unit had been specially trained to construct Naval Pontoon Causeways to provide firm roads over soft beaches and to provide 'dryshod' landings for disembarking vehicles. The RE History comments that:

'Though, owing to partial failures in the arrangements for towing across the Channel, and later ro damage by storm, the number and speed of these causeways was not up to expectations, the Kent R.E. working with a will with the material as it came to hand, had some in operation by 11 June, and in the next week 1,339 vehicles, 35,150 personnel, and 450 tons of stores were disembarked by this means. The stream along the causeways continued for some weeks'.

=== Vernon Bridge ===
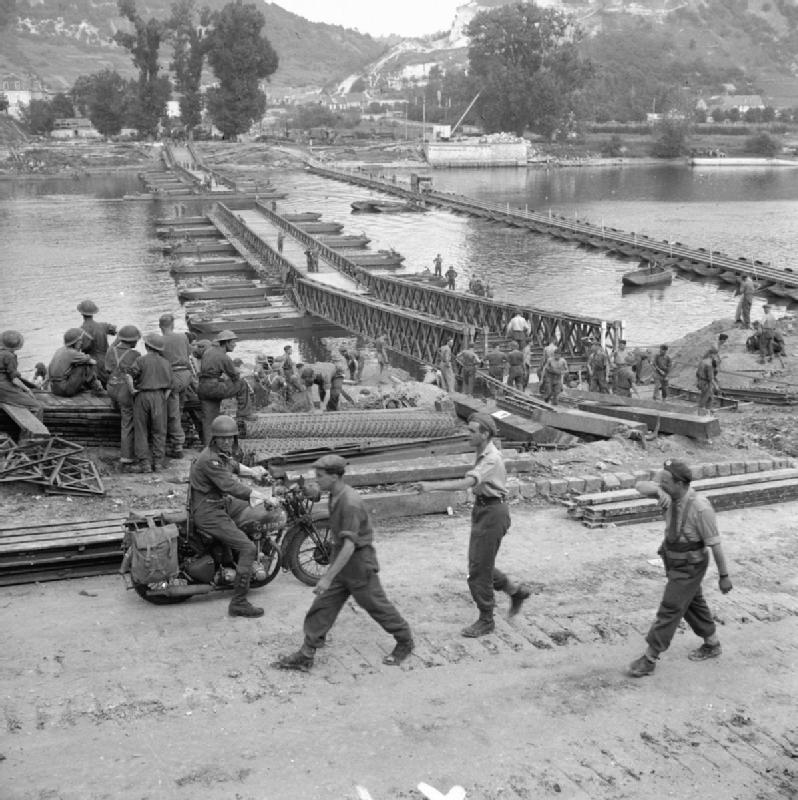
Bridges laid at Vernon, 28 August 1944

During training in Northern Ireland, the unit's CO, Lt-Col Fayle, had developed a method of moving tanks across water obstacles using powered rafts. By the time 15th (Kent) GHQTRE landed in Normandy, 582 and 584 Field Companies had become experts in rafting, while 583 Field Company specialised in operating storm boats. For the crucial assault crossing of the River Seine at Vernon by 43rd (Wessex) Infantry Division, the unit was tasked with manning DUKW amphibious trucks during the initial assault and then operating close support rafts before the first bridge was laid. Then, after a 40-ton Bailey bridge had been completed, they were to build a 70-ton Bailey bridge to permit fully laden tank transporters to cross. The heavy bridging equipment was held back on the road and only two platoons of 583 Field Company went forward with the assault group on 25 August. The storm boats were intended as a reserve but had to be used in the first wave because launching points for DUKWs were hard to find.

On the right, 5th Battalion Wiltshire Regiment began crossing at 19.00 on 25 August in eight storm boats manned by 583 Field Company, but they grounded before reaching the far side, and were raked by machine gun fire, incurring heavy casualties among boat crews and passengers. By the end of an hour, only one boat remained. Only about a company had got across, and they were overrun during the night. Three of the four available DUKWs also grounded, the survivor ferrying across the rest of 5th Wiltshire in the dark. On the left, 4th Battalion Somerset Light Infantry got across in the storm boats relatively easily, but found that their bridgehead was on an island, and they were still cut off from the east bank.

The rafting troops did not get to the river until the evening of 26 August, and struggled to get a tank ferry into operation before morning on the 27th. However, 43rd Division had succeeded in seizing and maintaining a bridgehead. The Kent REs' third task in this complex operation was to build a 223-metre Bailey, codenamed SAUL, in 36 hours. When the 15th (Kent) GHQTRE and other bridging units had completed their tasks, 43rd Division and its supporting armour crossed in strength on 28 August and began 21st Army Group's rapid advance to Brussels.

=== Nijmegen ===
After the failure of Operation Market Garden, the vital road and rail bridges that had been captured at Nijmegen were damaged by German swimmers who attached mines to the piers. A hole was blown in the roadway of the road bridge, but was swiftly repaired by the insertion of two Bailey spans by 15th (Kent) GHQ TRE and XXX CTRE; the bridges were also camouflaged.

=== Operation Plunder ===
Early in 1945, in order to improve the lines of communication for Second Army's planned assault crossing of the Rhine (Operation Plunder), additional bridges were constructed over the Maas at Venlo. 15th (Kent) GHQTRE was responsible for a 1220-foot (370 m) all-weather Class 40 Bailey pontoon bridge. 15th (Kent) GHQTRE was assigned to XII Corps for Operation Plunder itself, with its CRE, Lt-Col Fayle, controlling all engineering work for the right hand brigade's assault crossing downstream of the Xanten ferry site (Operation Torchlight).

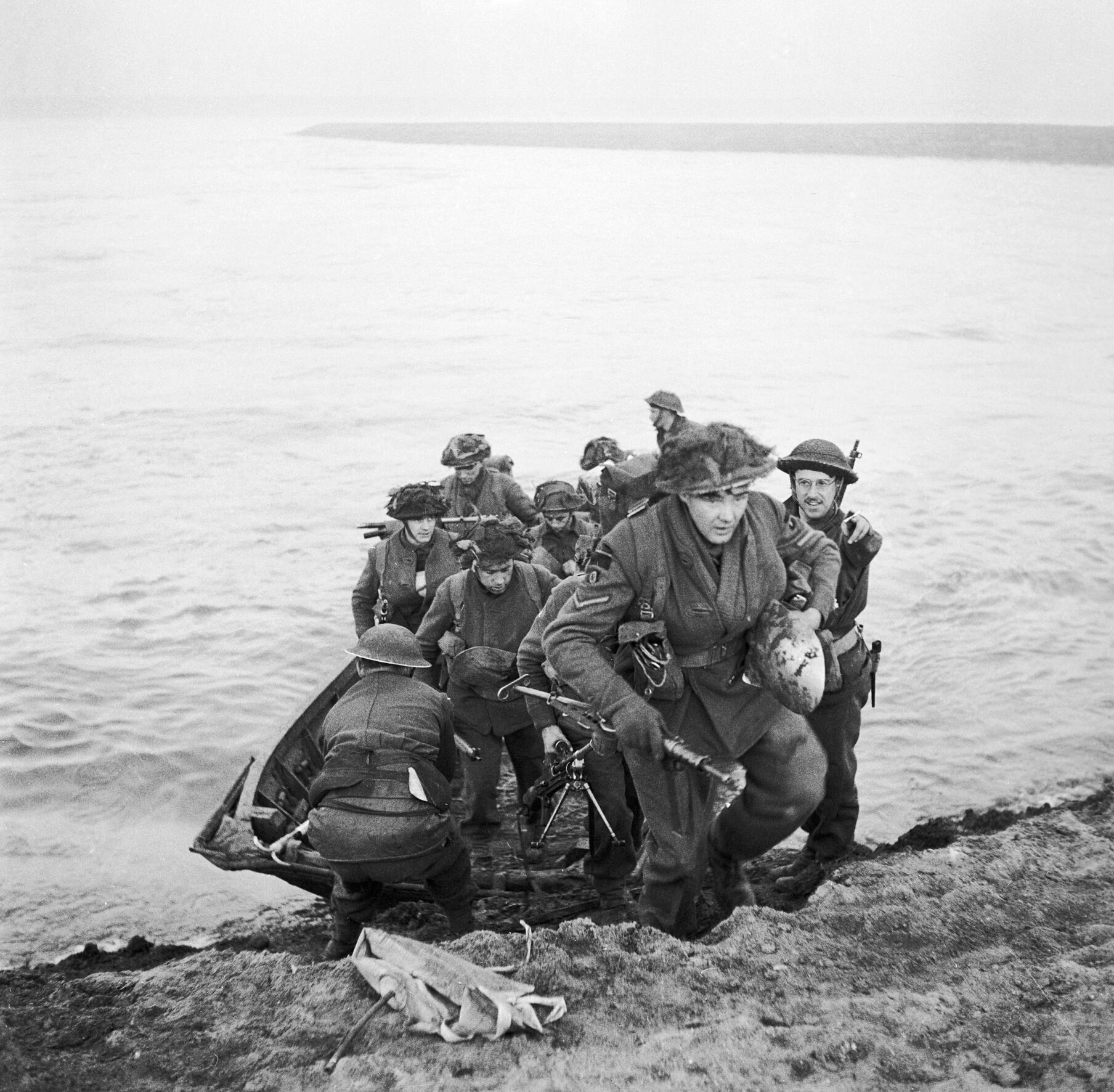
Men of 15th Scottish Division crossing the Rhine by stormboat on 24 March 1945.

This was carried out by 44th (Lowland) Brigade of 15th (Scottish) Division during the night of 23/24 March 1945. The first wave of infantry crossed at 02.00 aboard Buffalo tracked landing vehicles manned by 11th Royal Tank Regiment of 79th Armoured Division. Storm boats manned by the Kent RE field companies were held back until it was known that the Buffalo crossings had been successful. Word to start crossing with 6th Battalion King's Own Scottish Borderers was received at 02.45 and from then on the storm boats kept up a continuous ferrying operation, despite breakdowns of the unreliable engines. The 6th KOSB crossed without a casualty. At 03.30, rafting equipment was moved down to the river bank on sledges and by 06.30 the Kent RE had two of these in operation (two others were destroyed by shellfire before they could be completed and had to be replaced later from reserves). These rafts took over surfacing material for the exits on the far bank, which was laid under RE supervision by German prisoners. The rafts worked continuously for two and a half days, transporting across 611 vehicles among other loads. The RE History records that the rafting troops received an unsolicited testimonial for their watermanship from a captured German officer who was being ferried back.

=== Bremen ===
After Bremen had been captured by XXX Corps on 27 April, the bridges connecting the two-halves of the city across the Weser were found to be destroyed. After some changes of plan, the Kent RE was tasked with building a barge bridge. Three river barges found on the site were used with Bailey superstructure, and a 456-foot (140 m) Class 40 bridge was opened for traffic at 04.00 on 2 May. All German forces facing 21st Army Group surrendered at Lüneburg Heath two days later, but there were many months of bridgebuilding and reconstruction work before the troops could be demobilised.

15th (Kent) GHQTRE was disbanded on 10 June 1946.

== Postwar ==
When the TA was reconstituted in 1947, 582 and 583 Fd Companies were reformed as squadrons in the new 120 (Kent) Construction Regiment, RE, at Gravesend, considered to descend from the Cinque Ports, Kent and Sussex Fortress Engineers, and taking its seniority (1890) from the 1st Sussex Engineers. The unit was assigned to 25 Engineer Group in Eastern Command and had the following organisation:

- Regimental HQ at Gravesend
- 312 Construction Squadron
- 321 Park Squadron
- 582 Construction Squadron
- 583 Construction Squadron

211 (Thames & Medway) Field Squadron joined the regiment from 119 Field Engineer Regiment, in 1950.

120 Construction Rgt was disbanded in 1950, when 211 (T&M) Fd Sqn returned to 119 Engineer Rgt and 583 Construction Sqn became an independent unit as 583 Bomb Disposal Squadron. When the TA was reduced into the Territorial and Army Volunteer Reserve (TAVR) in 1967, the squadron was incorporated into a new 590 Specialist Team RE (Explosive Ordnance Disposal) at Dover. In 1975, this became 590 EOD Squadron at Rochester under 33 Engineer Regiment (EOD), transferring to 101 (City of London) Engineer Regiment in 1988 and redesignated 221 Field Squadron (EOD) in 1993.

== Heritage ==
The present-day 579 Field Squadron (Explosive Ordnance Disposal), RE, raised in 1939 from the Cinque Ports Fortress RE, claims direct descent from 1/6th (Kent Fortress) Field Company of 1914–18.

== Notes ==
- Becke, Maj A.F., History of the Great War: Order of Battle of Divisions, Part 1: The Regular British Divisions, London: HM Stationery Office, 1934/Uckfield: Naval & Military Press, 2007, ISBN 1-847347-38-X.
- Becke, Maj A.F.,History of the Great War: Order of Battle of Divisions, Part 2a: The Territorial Force Mounted Divisions and the 1st-Line Territorial Force Divisions (42–56), London: HM Stationery Office, 1935/Uckfield: Naval & Military Press, 2007, ISBN 1-847347-39-8.
- Becke, Maj A.F.,History of the Great War: Order of Battle of Divisions, Part 2b: The 2nd-Line Territorial Force Divisions (57th–69th), with the Home-Service Divisions (71st–73rd) and 74th and 75th Divisions, London: HM Stationery Office, 1937/Uckfield: Naval & Military Press, 2007, ISBN 1-847347-39-8.
- Brazier, C C H (2004). XD Operations: Secret British missions denying oil to the Nazis. Barnsley: Pen And Sword Books. ISBN 1-84415-136-0.
- Brig-Gen Sir James E. Edmonds, History of the Great War: Military Operations, France and Belgium, 1916, Vol I, London: Macmillan,1932/Woking: Shearer, 1986, ISBN 0-946998-02-7.
- Maj L.F. Ellis, History of the Second World War, United Kingdom Military Series: Victory in the West, Vol I: The Battle of Normandy, London: HM Stationery Office, 1962/Uckfield: Naval & Military, 2004, ISBN 1-845740-58-0.
- Essame, Maj-Gen H., The 43rd Wessex Division at War 1944–45, London: William Clowes, 1952.
- Ford, Ken, Assault Crossing: The River Seine 1944, 2nd Edn, Bradford: Pen & Sword, 2011, ISBN 978-1-84884-576-3.
- Gale, General Sir Richard, A Call to Arms, an Autobiography, Hutchinson, 1968
- Keller, Major Shawn, USAF, "Turning Point: a History of German Petroleum in World War II and its lessons for the role of oil in modern warfare", Air Command and Staff College. https://apps.dtic.mil/sti/tr/pdf/AD1020261.pdf
- Martin, Lt-Gen H.G., The History of the Fifteenth Scottish Division 1939–1945, Edinburgh: Blackwood, 1948/Uckfield: Naval & Military Press, 2014, ISBN 978-1-78331-085-2.
- Capt Wilfred Miles, History of the Great War: Military Operations, France and Belgium 1917, Vol III, The Battle of Cambrai, London: HM Stationery Office, 1948/Uckfield: Naval and Military Press, 2009, ISBN 978-1-84574724-4.
- Col L.F. Morling, Sussex Sappers: A History of the Sussex Volunteer and Territorial Army Royal Engineer Units from 1890 to 1967, Seaford: 208th Field Co, RE/Christians–W.J. Offord, 1972.
- Maj-Gen R.P. Pakenham-Walsh, History of the Corps of Royal Engineers, Vol VIII, 1938–1948, Chatham: Institution of Royal Engineers, 1958.
- Maj-Gen R.P. Pakenham-Walsh, History of the Corps of Royal Engineers, Vol IX, 1938–1948, Chatham: Institution of Royal Engineers, 1958.
- Tim Saunders, Operation Plunder: The British and Canadian Rhine Crossing, Barnsley: Pen & Sword Books, 2006, ISBN 1-84415-221-9.
- Victor T.C. Smith, Coalhouse Fort and the Artillery Defences at East Tilbury: A History and Guide, Thurrock: Coalhouse Fort Project, 1985.
- Thomas, Geoffrey J; Ketley, Barry (2003). KG 200 The Luftwaffe's most secret unit. Crowborough, UK: Hikoki Publications. ISBN 1-902109-33-3.
- Graham E. Watson & Richard A. Rinaldi, The Corps of Royal Engineers: Organization and Units 1889–2018, Tiger Lily Books, 2018, ISBN 978-171790180-4.
- Westlake, R.A., Royal Engineers (Volunteers) 1859–1908, Wembley: R.A. Westlake, 1983, ISBN 0-9508530-0-3.
