= George Grogan =

Recipient of the Victoria Cross (1875–1962)

Brigadier-General George Grogan VC CB CMG DSO & Bar
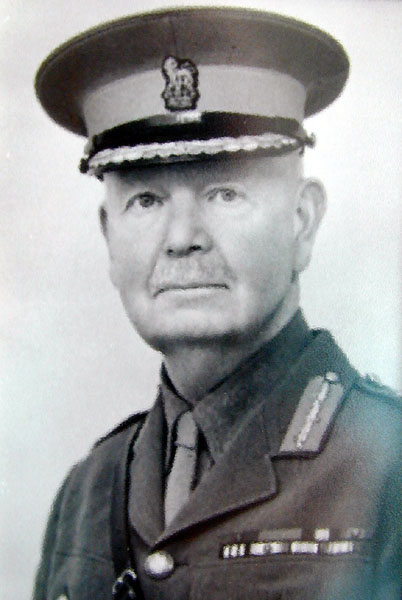
- Grogan in c. 1918
- Born: 1 September 1875; Devonport, Devon
- Died: 3 January 1962 (aged 86); Sunningdale, Berkshire
- Relatives: Admiral Sir William King-Hall (grandfather)
- Military career
- Allegiance: United Kingdom
- Branch: British Army
- Service years: 1896–1926
- Rank: Brigadier-General
- Units: West India Regiment; Worcestershire Regiment
- Commands: 5th Brigade; 3rd Battalion, Worcestershire Regiment; 238th Infantry Brigade; 23rd Brigade; 2nd Battalion, Worcestershire Regiment
- Conflicts: Hut Tax War of 1898; First World War; Russian Civil War
- Awards: Victoria Cross; Companion of the Order of the Bath; Companion of the Order of St Michael and St George; Distinguished Service Order & Bar; Mentioned in Despatches (8)
- Other work: Gentleman at Arms

Brigadier-General George William St George Grogan, VC, CB, CMG, DSO & Bar (1 September 1875 – 3 January 1962) was a career officer in the British Army and a recipient of the Victoria Cross, the highest award for gallantry in the face of the enemy that can be awarded to British and Commonwealth forces.

== Military career ==
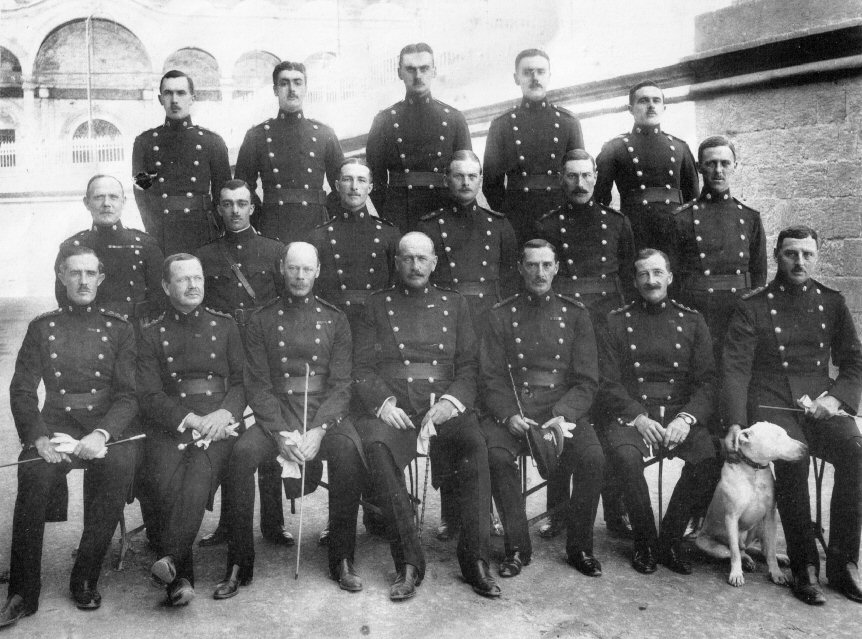
Officers of the 1st Battalion, Worcestershire Regiment, Egypt, 1914. Captain Grogan is sat in the front row, second from the left.

Educated at Haileybury and Imperial Service College and the Royal Military College, Sandhurst, Grogan was commissioned into the West India Regiment in September 1896, later serving in Sierra Leone in the Hut Tax War of 1898. Promoted to captain on 5 November 1900, he was seconded for service with the Egyptian Army in May 1902, and stayed there for five years. In 1907 he joined the Yorkshire Light Infantry, moving to the Worcestershire Regiment in 1908. He was promoted on 4 February 1908 to captain.

Promoted to major on 28 September 1914, Grogan joined the 2nd Battalion, 2nd Division, of the British Expeditionary Force (BEF). Wounded in January 1915, after the Battle of Neuve Chapelle he took command of the 1st Battalion as temporary lieutenant colonel. On 1 January 1916 he was created a Companion of the Order of St Michael and St George (CMG) and was mentioned in despatches. After fighting in the Battle of the Somme in 1916, he was awarded the Distinguished Service Order (DSO) in March 1917 and that month promoted to temporary brigadier general and was appointed to command the 23rd Brigade, 8th Division, from April 1917 as temporary brigadier general. The citation for his DSO read:

For conspicuous gallantry and devotion to duty when in command of his battalion. He visited the captured trenches during the action and gave instructions regarding dispositions and consolidation. He kept the brigade informed of the situation and his reports were of great value. The spirit of his battalion owes much to his personal courage and cheerfulness.

In the retreat during Operation Michael in March 1918, Grogan's efforts resulted in the award of a Bar to his DSO. The citation for the award read:

For conspicuous gallantry and devotion during a long period of active operations. On one occasion, when in command of the left division, it was mainly due to his personal efforts that the line was maintained and extended when troops of the left were withdrawn. Whenever the position became critical he went forward himself to restore the situation, and his splendid example of courage and endurance greatly inspired all ranks.

During the Third Battle of the Aisne, Grogan won the VC for inspiring the defence of a hill above the River Vesle at Jonchery during 27–29 May 1918. The citation for the award read:

For most conspicuous bravery and leadership throughout three days of intense fighting. Brigadier-General Grogan was, except for a few hours, in command of the remnants of the Infantry of a Division and various attached troops. His action during the whole of the battle can only be described as magnificent. The utter disregard for his personal safety, combined with the sound practical ability which he displayed, materially helped to stay the onward thrust of the enemy masses. Throughout the third day of operations, a most critical day, he spent his time under artillery, trench mortar, rifle and machine-gun fire, riding up and down the front line encouraging his troops, reorganising those who had fallen into disorder, leading back into the line those who were beginning to retire, and setting such a wonderful example that he inspired with his enthusiasm not only his own men but also the Allied troops who were alongside. As a result the line held and repeated enemy attacks were repulsed. He had one horse shot under him, but nevertheless continued on foot to encourage his men until another horse was brought. He displayed throughout the highest valour, powers of command and leadership.

In 1919 Grogan was sent with the 1st Brigade of the "Relief Force Russia" under General Lord Rawlinson to evacuate the North Russia intervention forces. On 3 June 1919 he was made a Companion of the Order of the Bath (CB).

In February 1920, having relinquished his temporary brigadier's rank in October 1919, he was made a substantive lieutenant colonel and a brevet colonel in April when he became a aide-de-camp to King George V. In October 1923 he reached the substantive rank of colonel, commanding the 5th Infantry Brigade in the 2nd Division. He relinquished this assignment, and his temporary rank of colonel commandant, in April 1925. He was then placed on the half-pay list and was granted the honorary rank of brigadier general upon his retirement from the army in June 1926.

Grogan served as an aide-de-camp (equerry) to King George V from 1920 to 1926. In 1933–45 he was appointed one of His Majesty's Bodyguard of the Honourable Corps of Gentlemen at Arms. He was colonel of the Worcestershire Regiment from 1938 to 1945, in which role he succeeded Field Marshal Sir Claude Jacob.

== Family ==
Grogan was the son of Colonel Edward George Grogan CB CBE, who commanded the 1st Battalion Black Watch in the Second Boer War, and his wife Meta, only daughter of Admiral Sir Sir William King-Hall. His paternal grandfather was Captain George Grogan of Sutton, County Dublin, a captain in the 6th Dragoon Guards.

On 22 January 1920 Grogan married Ethel G Elger, eldest daughter of John Elger the Younger, at Holy Trinity Church, Chelsea, London. They had two sons: Gwyn, born 7 August 1921, and Edward, born 27 June 1924.

== Bibliography ==
- Gliddon, Gerald (2013) [2004]. Spring Offensive 1918. VCs of the First World War. The History Press. ISBN 978-0-7524-8730-4.
