= Brian Wyldbore-Smith =

Major-General Sir Brian Wyldbore-Smith CB DSO OBE
- Born: 10 July 1913; County Durham
- Died: 6 December 2005 (aged 92)
- Military career
- Allegiance: United Kingdom
- Branch: British Army
- Rank: Major-General
- Service number: 56595
- Unit: Royal Artillery
- Commands: 44th (Home Counties) Division
- Conflicts: Second World War; Malayan Emergency
- Awards: Knight Bachelor; Companion of the Order of the Bath; Distinguished Service Order; Officer of the Order of the British Empire

Major-General Sir Francis Brian Wyldbore-Smith, CB, DSO, OBE (10 July 1913 – 6 December 2005) was a British Army officer.

== Military career ==
Educated at Wellington College and the Royal Military Academy, Woolwich, Wyldbore-Smith was commissioned into the Royal Artillery on 31 August 1933. He saw action as a brigade major at the Second Battle of El Alamein in North Africa in October 1942 and then took part in the crossing of the Garigliano during the Italian Campaign of the Second World War for which he was appointed a Companion of the Distinguished Service Order. He later took part in the Normandy landings and the advance through North West Europe, commanding 179th Field Regiment, Royal Artillery.

After the war he became commanding officer of the 15th/19th The King's Royal Hussars in Malaya during the Malayan Emergency, then Chief of Staff to the Commander-in-Chief Far East Command and then General Officer Commanding 44th (Home Counties) Division in July 1965 before retiring in 1968.

In retirement he served as Director of the Conservative Party's Board of Finance from 1970 to 1992.

He was knighted in the 1980 Birthday Honours for political service.

== Family ==
In 1944, he married Molly Cayzer, daughter of Lord Rotherwick; they had a son and four daughters.

== Works ==
- Wyldbore-Smith, Brian (2001). March Past: The Memoirs of a Major-General. Memoir Club. ISBN 978-1841040394.

Military offices
Preceded by Harry Grimshaw	GOC 44th (Home Counties) Division; 1965–1968	Post disbanded
