= Bristol Engineer Volunteers =

Bristol Engineer Volunteers 2nd Gloucestershire (The Bristol Engineer Volunteer Corps) South Midland Divisional Engineers 48th (South Midland) Divisional Engineers 112 Construction Regiment, RE
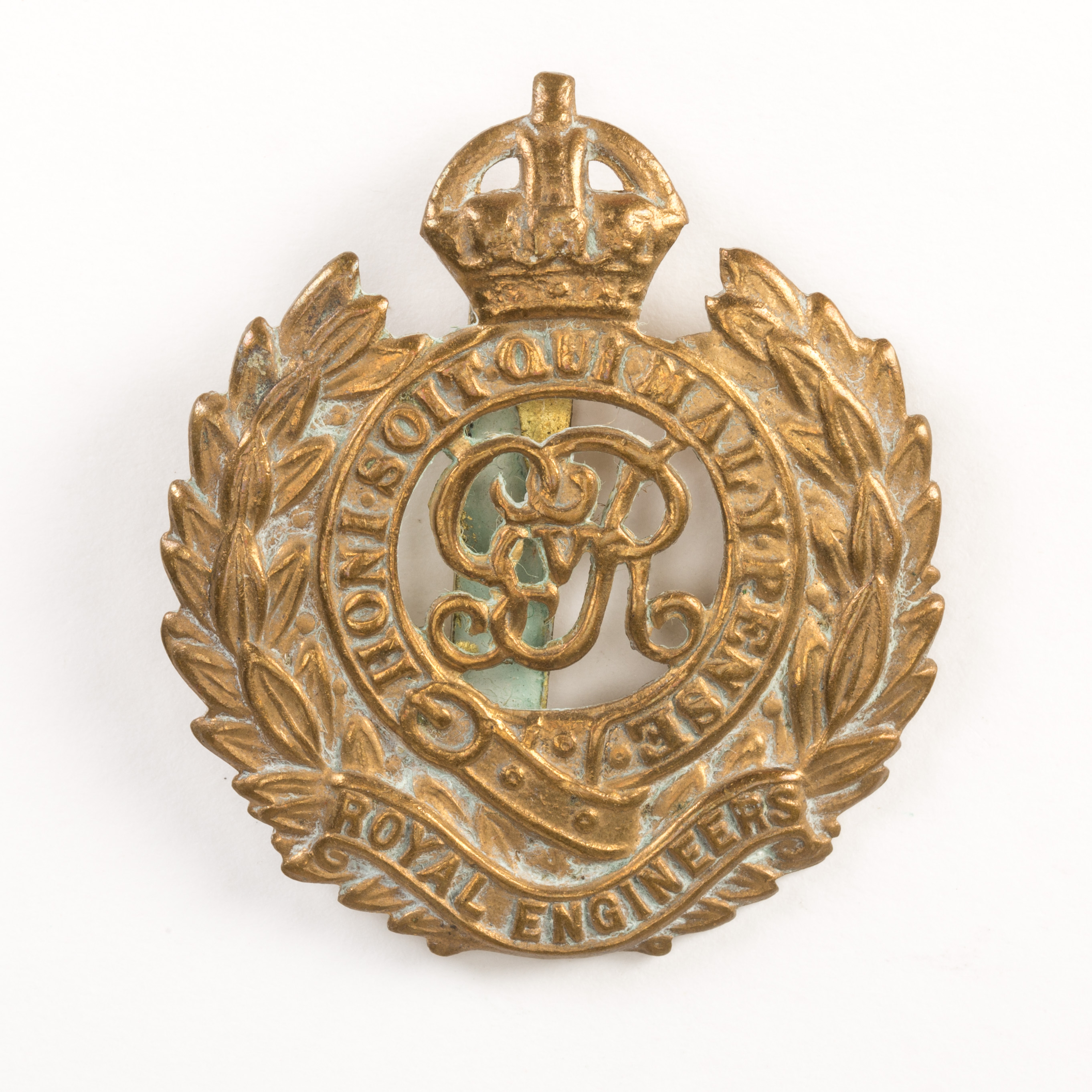
- RE Cap badge (King George V cipher)
- Active: 10 April 1861–1 April 1967
- Country: United Kingdom
- Branch: Territorial Army
- Role: Field engineers
- Part of: 48th (South Midland) Division
- Garrison/HQ: Bristol
- Engagements: World War I: Battle of the Somme; Battle of Fromelles; Third Battle of Ypres; Italian Front; German spring offensive; Hundred Days Offensive; World War II: Battle of France; Tunisian campaign; Italian Campaign; North West Europe Campaign

The Bristol Engineer Volunteer Corps was a part-time unit of Britain's Royal Engineers, first raised in 1861. It went on to provide the Sappers for the 48th (South Midland) Division of the Territorial Force, serving in both World Wars and postwar until 1967.

== Volunteer Force ==
The enthusiasm for the Volunteer movement following an invasion scare in 1859 saw the creation of many Rifle, Artillery and Engineer Volunteer units composed of part-time soldiers eager to supplement the Regular British Army in time of need. One such unit was the 2nd Gloucestershire Engineer Volunteer Corps (EVC) formed at Bristol on 10 April 1861 by employees of the Bristol and Exeter Railway. Administratively, it was attached to the 1st Gloucestershire Artillery Volunteers from August 1862. However, in July 1867, it was transferred to a new 1st Administrative Battalion, Gloucestershire Engineer Volunteers. The Administrative Battalion was based on the 1st Gloucestershire EVC, with its headquarters at Bristol, and was joined by the 1st Somerset EVC the following year, and by the 1st Devonshire EVC when that was formed in 1869.

With the reorganisation of the Volunteer Force in 1880, the Gloucestershire Admin Bn was consolidated as the 1st Gloucestershire (Gloucester, Somerset and Devon) EVC. However, the 2nd Gloucestershire kept its independence, and severed its connection with the battalion the following year to become the 2nd Gloucestershire (The Bristol Engineer Volunteer Corps). It retained this title even after the other units abandoned EVC titles and became simply 'RE (Volunteers)'. The 2nd Gloucesters established a Cadet Corps on 19 February 1879, which was based at Clifton College and provided a number of recruits to the unit in 1914.

The Bristol Engineer Volunteers sent a detachment of one officer and 25 other ranks to assist the regular REs during the Second Boer War in 1900, and a second detachment the following year.

== Territorial Force ==
When the Volunteers were subsumed into the new Territorial Force (TF) in 1908, the 2nd Gloucester (except H Company) transferred, becoming the divisional engineers for the TF's South Midland Division and the Army Service Corps company for the Gloucester and Worcester Brigade of the division. (Note: Some sources indicate that the ASC Company was found by F Company of the 1st Gloucestershire RE (V), the only part of that unit to transfer.) The new unit was organised as follows:

South Midland Divisional Engineers

- HQ at 32 Park Row, Bristol
- 1st South Midland Field Company at Bristol
- 2nd South Midland Company at Bristol
- South Midland Divisional Telegraph (later Signal) Company
  - HQ and No 1 Section at Bristol
  - No 2 (Warwickshire) Section attached to the Warwickshire Brigade
  - No 3 (Gloucester and Worcester) Section attached to the Gloucester and Worcester Brigade
  - No 4 (South Midland) Section attached to the South Midland Brigade

Nos 2–4 Sections were largely manned by the infantry brigades to which they were attached. The Telegraph Company was termed a Signal Company from 1911.

The unit tended to refer to itself as the South Midland Royal Engineers (SMRE). Clifton College Cadet Corps transferred to the junior division of the Officers' Training Corps.

== World War I ==
=== Mobilisation ===
On the outbreak of war in August 1914, the SMRE mobilised under the command of Lt-Col E.S. Sinnott as Commanding Royal Engineer (CRE) of the South Midland Division and concentrated with the division at Swindon before marching to Chelmsford in Essex. Here, the division formed part of Central Force defending Eastern England. The sappers began working on the outer defences of London.

On 31 August 1914, the formation of Reserve or 2nd Line units for each existing TF unit was authorised. Initially these were formed from men who had not volunteered for overseas service, and the recruits who were flooding in. The titles of these 2nd Line units would be the same as the original, but distinguished by a '2/' prefix. Later, the 2nd Line units also went overseas, and 3rd Line units were raised to train drafts for the units serving abroad, some of which in turn went overseas. Later, a 482 (South Midland) Reserve Field Company was raised. This did not leave the UK, and was probably quickly absorbed into the central training organisation.

=== 48th (South Midland) Divisional RE ===
The first unit of the division to go on active service was 1/1st South Midland Field Company, which joined the newly raised Regular 27th Division on 4 December 1914 and went with it to France later that month. After seeing service in the trenches through the winter, and at the Action at St Eloi (14–15 March 1915), the company transferred to 5th Division on 24 March, and then to 6th Division on 10 April.

==== Western Front ====
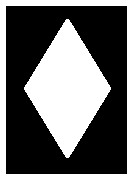
48th (South Midland) Division's WWI formation sign.

The rest of the South Midland Division completed its war training and was selected for service with the British Expeditionary Force (BEF) on the Western Front. Orders were received on 13 March 1915 and the units began entraining on 22 March. 1/2nd Field Company's horses and equipment were embarked on the SS Matheran at Southampton, to be followed by the rest of the company on the faster SS Munich. Disembarkation was complete by 1 April and the division concentrated near Cassel by 3 April, as part of III Corps in GHQ Reserve, with 1/2nd SM Field Company at Ploegsteert ('Plugstreet').

Divisional engineers in the field were being increased to a strength of three companies (one per brigade in the division). 1/1st West Lancashire Field Company was attached to the SMRE from 55th (West Lancashire) Division from 18 to 28 April 1915, when it was replaced by the Regular 7th Field Company from 4th Division. 1/1st South Midland Field Company returned to the division from 6th Division on 1 May. In June, 2/1st South Midland Field Company arrived from England to relieve 7th Field Company. The division was officially designated the 48th (South Midland) Division from 12 May.

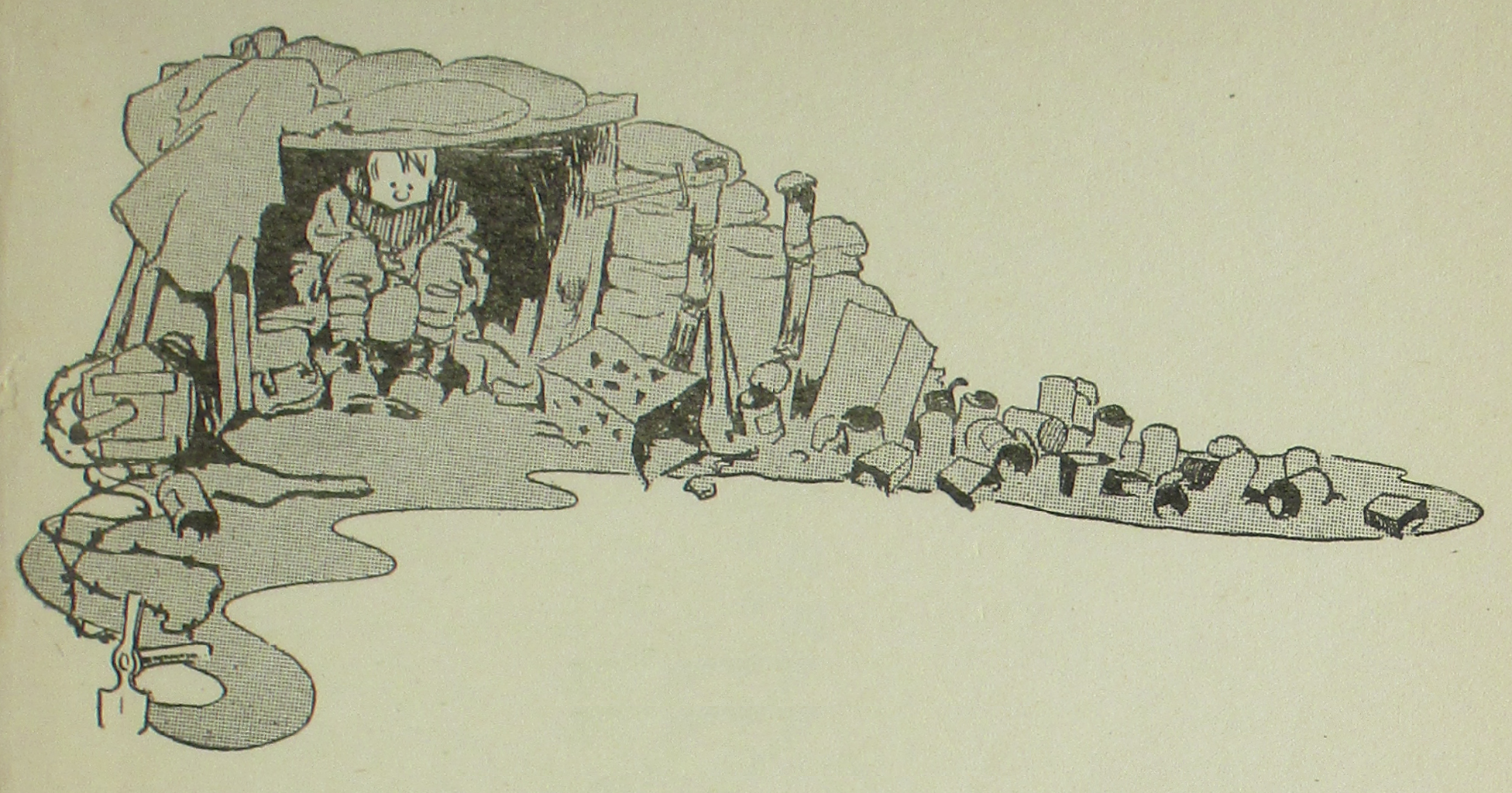
A dugout drawn by Captain Bruce Bairnsfather. Bairnsfather's first cartoons for The Bystander were drawn at a farm near 'Plugstreet' just before 48th (SM) Division took over the line.

48th (SM) Division went into the line in the Plugstreet sector, with the field companies and infantry working parties engaged in work at night to improve the poorly constructed fire trenches, dugouts and barbed wire entanglements. Owing to wet subsoil, the trenches could not be dug to a depth of more than 3 feet (0.91 m), and had to be built up with parapets of sandbags, while shallow dugouts were roofed with corrugated iron and layers of sandbags. The sappers also carried out demolitions to clear the field of fire, and constructed communication trenches, which had not previously been provided. The sector was under regular German shellfire and the units suffered a steady trickle of casualties.

On 25 June, the division was withdrawn for rest, and then from 12 July took over the line in the mining villages around Loos, before taking over the Foncquevillers sector from the French army on 24 July. The divisional RE's work included felling timber for new artillery positions, improving the water supply, providing deeper dugouts for headquarters and constructing 'keeps' for all-round defence. The sappers spent much of the following winter pumping water out of the trenches and dugouts. In the spring of 1916, preparations began for that summer's 'Big Push' (the Battle of the Somme). This involved constructing protected observation posts for the artillery and assembly trenches for the infantry, filling supply dumps, and additional dugouts for signallers. 48th Divisional RE was also ordered to carry out trials on various forms of Bangalore torpedo for destroying barbed wire entanglements. 1/2nd SM Field Company devised a way of using a Bangalore torpedo to destroy a traverse in a trench to provide a 'bomb stop' with a clear field of fire to prevent enemy bombing parties working from one traverse to another. At the beginning of May 1916, the division was relieved from the front line, and went for rest and training, including pontoon and trestle bridging for the sappers. In mid-June the division returned to reserve positions at Hébuterne, where the RE were employed in constructing boxes to house gas cylinders and smoke candles in the front line, and then carry in the cylinders prior to the attack.

==== Somme ====
Although 48th (SM) Division had served on the Western Front continuously for over a year, its first major actions came with the Somme offensive. Most of the division was held in reserve on the First day on the Somme (1 July) and only brought up closer to the line in the afternoon (though the few battalions in the attack suffered very badly). The smoke and gas cloud succeeded in drawing enemy fire and isolating the Attack on the Gommecourt Salient, though the attack was a disaster. The attack in front of Serre had also failed and the infantry of 48th (SM) Division were tasked with a follow-up attack the next day, which also failed. The division remained in the battle zone for the next two weeks.

On 13 July, 48th Divisional RE came under the orders of the CRE of X Corps for road construction duty in the captured area round Ovillers-la-Boisselle. 48th (SM) Division then took part in the Battle of Bazentin Ridge (15–17 July), including the capture of Ovillers on 17 July, and two spells in the Battles of Pozières Ridge (23–27 July and 13–28 August). The division's participation consisted of brigade-scale attacks with limited objectives, in which the RE field companies were used to consolidate the captured trenches, repairing shell damage, creating bomb stops and strongpoints. During the attack on the Leipzig Redoubt, at 17.00 on 18 August, 143rd (Warwickshire) Brigade took its objectives and two sections of 1/2nd SM Field Company followed up at about 19.30 to consolidate, within 50 yards (46 m) of a German-held trench. Here, they used their rifles to help repel a German counter-attack. Over following days the sappers dug new communication trenches up to the newly captured line. The division was relieved on 28 August.

Out of the line, the units of the division absorbed reinforcement drafts to bring them back up to strength (1/2nd Field Company alone had lost 35 casualties, or 22 per cent of its sappers). The sappers then returned to the area of Hébuterne and Foncquevillers], working on trench repairs. In November, it moved into the devastated area of the Somme battlefield, working on road repairs and erecting wooden huts for the winter. In January 1917, 48th Divisional RE began work on a new Corps defence line, then on taking over a sector in front of Péronne from the French

In February 1917, the TF field companies were numbered:

- 1/1st became 474th (South Midland)
- 1/2nd became 475th (South Midland)
- 2/1st became 477th (South Midland)

==== Hindenburg Line ====
In March, the Germans began a withdrawal to the Hindenburg Line (Operation Alberich) and 48th (SM) Division followed, the RE having already carefully reconnoitred the German positions on the first rumours of the retreat. 48th Divisional RE took forward pontoons and bridge trestles and, on 17 March, 475th Field Company completed a trestle bridge spanning a 60 feet (18 m) gap over the Somme Canal, while ferrying infantry and artillery across the River Somme on pontoon rafts. The Divisional RE then built a new transport bridge over the river and its marshes on the site of the demolished German bridge. The division occupied Péronne on 18 March. Within 10 days, the divisional field companies with infantry working parties completed six footbridges, three horse transport bridges and one heavy bridge, which they named 'Bristol Bridge'.

To support III Corps Cavalry Regiment in probing forwards, 48th (SM) Division formed an advanced guard under Brig-Gen H.D.O, Ward of an infantry battalion, two field artillery batteries and two RE sections, known as 'Ward's Force'. The rest of the RE and large working parties of infantry were engaged in restoring communications across the area left devastated by the retreating enemy, the sappers suffering casualties and damage to equipment from German booby-traps. By the end of the month, British troops were approaching the Hindenburg Line, and there were some sharp fights against rearguards. During April, Fourth Army began operations against the fortified village outposts in front of the main Hindenburg position. 145th (South Midland) Brigade captured a cluster of villages including Ronssoy, Basse Boulogne, and Lempire on 5 April, and that evening the RE began establishing a new line of resistance near Holnon, Ronssoy, Épehy and Metz-en-Couture. In May, 48th Divisional RE moved back to the Péronne area and spent the next two months working and training there before moving by rail to the Ypres Salient on 5 July.

==== Ypres ====
48th (SM) Division was now in Fifth Army, which was preparing for the Third Ypres Offensive. The division was in reserve for the opening attack (the Battle of Pilckem Ridge) on 31 July, but went into the line of 4 August to relieve one of the divisions shattered in that partial success. 48th Divisional RE took over dugouts in the Yser Canal bank and began work on wooden tracks, duckboards and tramways over the battlefield that had already turned to mud. 48th (SM) Division attacked on 16 August in the second phase of the offensive (the Battle of Langemarck). 474th Field Company was detailed to work on forward strongpoints, 475th on roads and tracks, and 477th on extending the tramway. The attacking brigade, 145th, overcame a strongpoint in St Julien after a hard fight, but was held up by machine guns a couple of hundred yards beyond. Over the following days, the division gained 800 yards (730 m) in three local actions. On 22 August, it was held up by the 'Springfield Line'; five days later, it renewed the attack against the Springfield Line and 'Vancouver Farm' behind a strong artillery barrage and successfully took its objectives. It was then relieved on 29 August.

At the end of September, 48th (SM) Division returned to the line. On 28 September, a group of 474th Field Company was constructing a new dugout when a heavy shell fell amongst them: seven were killed and 17 wounded. Among the dead was the officer commanding, Maj H.C. Clissold, DSO, former science master at Clifton College and commandant of the school Cadet Corps. The division attacked at the Battle of Broodseinde (4 October), where the field companies' role was to extend the duckboard tracks forwards, prepare large signboards at the various objectives (to guide follow-up troops) and to repair the roads behind the lines. The division attempted another advance at the Battle of Poelcappelle (9 October), but the weather and the ground conditions had worsened, and it was stopped on its starting line by the aggressive forward defence tactics of the German 16th Division. Afterwards, the division was relieved and sent to the quieter Vimy sector. During the fighting at Ypres, 475th Field Company had suffered 99 battle casualties, representing 22 per cent of its drivers and 55 per cent of its sappers.

==== Italy ====
On 10 November 1917, the division received orders to proceed to the Italian Front to reinforce the Italian Army, which had recently been defeated by Austro-German forces at the Battle of Caporetto. Entrainment began on 21 November, and detraining around Legnano on the Adige was complete by 1 December. The following day, the division began moving northwards to billeting areas in reserve behind the Italian lines on the Asiago plateau, with the RE around Pozzoleone. 48th (SM) Division moved closer to the line towards the end of January, in support of the British divisions on the front line along the River Piave. The main duty for the field companies was to improve the defences, which lacked depth, machine-gun positions, shelters etc.

On 1 March 1918, 48th (SM) Division completed the relief of the British 7th Division in the front line of the Montello Sector on the Piave Front, and held the line until relieved on 16 March. The RE companies were kept busy improving the defences. On 1 April, the division moved northwards and went into reserve for the middle sector of the Asiago Plateau. Here there was much work to be done on the defences and communications in the wooded mountains, where transport was largely by pack animals supplemented by ropeways. On 15 June, the division was engaged in heavy defensive fighting on the Asiago Plateau during the Battle of the Piave River, where the Austrian attack in the woods made a number of incursions into the division's line. One of these was on the right flank, where the flank battalion had to pull back both its flanks and put every clerk, orderly and cook into the line with a rifle. The divisional commander ordered the CRE, Lt-Col Briggs, to push 477th Fd Company up into the gap as infantry to make contact with the flanking division, which it was unable to do. The enemy, however, were unable or unwilling to push into 'Happy Valley', the fire zone between the two divisions. Meanwhile, 474th Fd Company with the pioneer battalion (1/5th (Cinque Ports) Bn, Royal Sussex Regiment) were holding the Red Line covering divisional HQ from a different breakthrough. The REs who saw the most fighting were a working part under the Regimental Sergeant Major who had been working on a dump that suddenly became the front line: they successfully held off attacks with rifle fire. The division carried out successful counter-attacks the following morning and regained the whole of its positions by 07.30.

48th Division remained on the Asiago Plateau under Italian command while the rest of the British forces moved to the Piave sector. As well as improving their defences, with the assistance of Italian sappers, the divisional RE spent much of the summer training and planning for the next offensive. From 11 October, the division came under XII Italian Corps for tactical purposes, but 477th Fd Company was loaned to XIV British Corps to help prepare bridges for the offensive across the Piave.

The Allied offensive (the Battle of Vittorio Veneto) began on 24 October on the Piave. By the evening of 28 October, the Austrians abandoned their positions on the Asiago Plateau and 48th (SM) Division advanced on 30 October, attacking the Austrian Winterstellung (Winter Line) next day. The division entered the Val d'Assa and 474th and 475th Fd Companies and 1/5th Royal Sussex made the steep mountain road across No man's land and through Asiago suitable for wheeled traffic, with only one serious demolition to overcome. One RE section consolidated captured trenches at Camporovere in case of an Austrian counter-attack. 144th (Gloucester & Worcester) Brigade seized Monte Interrotto early on 2 November, and 143rd (Warwickshire) Bde was ordered to form the advance guard for the pursuit, accompanied by half of 475th Fd Company and some field artillery. By the end of the day, 48th (SM) Division was far ahead of its flanking Allied formations, and next day, at Osteria del Termine, it surrounded and captured a force of about 14 battalions, including the commander of Austrian III Corps and three divisional commanders. On 4 November, the Armistice with Austria-Hungary came into force, by which time the division had pushed forward into the Trentino.

After the conclusion of hostilities on the Italian Front, the division was withdrawn from the front line. On 11 November, as the last troops of the division were leaving Austria, news arrived of the Armistice with Germany signalling the end of the war. The division withdrew to the area around Trissino. Demobilisation began in early 1919 and the remaining cadre of the divisional engineers set off for England on 24 March. After landing at Southampton, they were sent to 'White City' at Ashton Gate, Bristol, for formal disembodiment on 4 April.

==== Commanders ====
The following officers served as Commanding Royal Engineer (CRE) of 48th (South Midland) Division during World War I:

- Lt-Col E.S. Sinnott, VD, appointed 11 May 1912
- Lt-Col H.J.M. Marshall, appointed 19 April 1915
- Maj A.D. Walker, acting from 27 February 1917
- Lt-Col V. Giles, appointed 3 March 1917
- Maj G.S.J.F. Eberle, acting from 25 January 1918
- Maj E. Briggs, acting from 18 February 1918
- Lt-Col E. Briggs, promoted 13 March 1918

=== 61st (2nd South Midland) Divisional RE ===
61st (2nd South Midland) Division's WWI formation sign.

Many of the volunteers of the 2nd Line Bristol RE units raised during the first five months of the war continued to live at home during their early training, until their units moved to Northampton where the 2nd South Midland Division was formed in January 1915; it was numbered 61st in August 1915. The Divisional RE were organised as follows:

61st (2nd South Midland) Divisional Engineers

- 2/1st South Midland Field Company – transferred to 48th Division (see above)
- 2/2nd South Midland Field Company
- 1/3rd South Midland Field Company – additional 1st Line unit formed after the outbreak of war
- 3/1st South Midland Field Company – 3rd Line unit to replace 2/1st above
- 61st Divisional Signal Company

In April, the division moved to the Chelmsford area and took over the coastal defences from the 48th (SM) Division; this meant that the CRE had 14 miles of defences to look after, as well as supervising the training of his field companies.

By May 1915, the remaining Home Service men had been removed from the 2nd Line TF to form provisional units for home defence, and 3rd Line units had been formed to supply reinforcement drafts, allowing the 2nd Line to be prepared for overseas service. 8th Provisional Company, RE, was converted into 647th (South Midland) Fd Company in December 1916 in 72nd Division, a home service formation, and 482nd (South Midland) Reserve Fd Company was formed in January 1917.

In December 1915 and January 1916, the field companies of 61st (SM) Division were stationed at Witham and training at Boreham, Braxted Park and Wickham Bishops respectively. In February 1916, 61st (2nd SM) Division moved to Salisbury Plain to complete its final battle training, with the field companies at Perham Down. On 21 May, entrainment began for the ports of embarkation; by 28 May, the division had disembarked and concentrated in XI Corps' rest area behind the lines in France, the first 2nd Line TF division to serve on the Western Front.

==== Fromelles ====
Whereas the 48th Division had over a year's frontline experience before making its first attack, the inexperienced 61st Division was thrown into an attack barely seven weeks after arriving in France. It took over trenches near Laventie for the first time on 13 June, and attacked at the mishandled Battle of Fromelles on 19 July. The water table in this sector was too high to allow deep trenches to be dug, so the line was defended by breastworks. Before the attack, the RE constructed sally ports to allow the assaulting infantry to exit their lines, and four-man parties of sappers were to accompany the infantry to clear remaining wire with Bangalore torpedoes, while other parties were to consolidate any enemy trenches captured. But the sally ports were too small and narrow, and German machine gunners cut down the infantry as they bunched to use them. 183rd (Gloucester & Worcester) and 184th (South Midland) Bdes were unable to advance. Instead of sally ports, 1/3rd SM Field Company on 183rd Bde's front had constructed underground passages leading into the pit in front of the British parapet, but there was a misunderstanding and the infantry did not use them. The only part of the division's attack that was initially successful was that of 182nd (Warwickshire) Bde, where the men had moved out into No man's land before the bombardment lifted off the German front line. Unsupported, this brigade had to fall back. The divisional casualties had been very heavy. As the attack was only a diversion from the main Somme offensive, it was not continued. 61st (2nd SM) Division was not entrusted with another major attack for over a year.

==== Winter 1916–17 ====
The division moved into corps reserve on 1 October, and after rest and training returned to the line on 20 November at Ovillers-la-Boisselle in the Somme sector, where it worked with infantry working parties on tracks, huts, communication trenches, deep dugouts and trench drainage, and built observation posts (OPs) for the artillery. During January 1917, 61st Division was engaged in operations on the Ancre, where everything had to be carried up to the line at night across fields of muddy shellholes on duckboard tracks laid by the sappers.

When the TF field companies were numbered in February 1917, those of 61st (2nd SM) Division were designated as follows:

- 1/3rd became 476th (South Midland)
- 2/2nd became 478th (South Midland)
- 3/1st became 479th (South Midland)

The RE continued working in the lines after the rest of 61st (2nd SM) Division was withdrawn for rest. The field companies followed on 4 February and underwent training until 25 February when they returned to the line at Vermandovillers. The German retreat to the Hindenburg Line began on 61st (2nd SM) Division's front on 14 March, and the field companies and divisional pioneers (1/5th Bn Duke of Cornwall's Light Infantry) were put to work repairing the roads and bridges across the devastated zone left by the Germans. After the division had closed up to the Hindenburg Line on 4 April, the RE companies established themselves around Caulaincourt and continued bridge work. In May, 476th Fd Coy was assisted by a section of 256th Tunnelling Company in constructing deep dugouts for infantry battalion HQs in the advanced positions. At the end of the month, the companies moved to the Arras area. From late June to early August, the sappers undertook training before the division moved to the Ypres Salient to join the Third Ypres Offensive.

==== Ypres ====
When the Battle of Langemarck began on 18 August, 61st Divisional RE moved up to Vlamertinge, but the division was only committed late in the battle (22 August), when 184th (2nd South Midland) Bde attacked against concrete pillboxes and fortified farms. 479th Field Coy sent up two-man teams of 'moppers-up' to accompany the infantry to use explosive charges and sledgehammers against the iron rear doors of the pillboxes, while other sections were detailed to consolidate the positions gained. While the fighting went on the company's advanced HQ dugout caught fire, and several sappers were badly burned or gassed after their respirators were burned (Company Sergeant-Major Nott and Sapper Mells were later awarded the Distinguished Conduct Medal and Military Medal respectively for their rescue work). In bitter fighting, 184th Bde only gained a few hundred yards of ground around 'Pond Farm' and 'Somme' the other field companies were not sent forward. Over the following days, the sappers toiled to consolidate the gains and to repair roads and bridges over the flooded Steenbeek stream. On 27 August and 10 September, the division was again halted by strongpoints hidden among farm buildings. RE work was continuous in the mud of the Ypres Salient even when the infantry were resting. 61st (2nd SM) Divisional RE were relieved on 15 September and went to the quieter Greenland Hill sector near Arras where they worked on defences.

==== Cambrai ====
At the end of November, 61st Division was moved to the Cambrai sector, where on 1 December it relieved the exhausted troops facing the German counter-attacks following the Battle of Cambrai. On 3 December, the Germans made their last effort and forced the division's Warwickshire and Gloucestershire battalions back to Welsh Ridge, but that was the limit of their success. A considerable amount of work was required to prepare defences, some of which incorporated parts of the Hindenburg Line support trenches.

During the winter, the sappers worked on new defences on Fifth Army's front. Due to its manpower shortages, the BEF had adopted a new policy of defence in depth, with an Outpost or Forward Zone, Battle Zone and Rear Zone. These were not continuous trench lines but consisted of a series of wired-in redoubts that could cover the intervening ground with machine gun fire. 61st (SM) Divisional RE did a great deal of work on the redoubt at Manchester Hill that was famously defended by 30th Division during the ensuing battle. They also prepared Fresnoy and Enghein Redoubts on their own front. On the night of 20/21 March, sappers from 476th Fd Coy accompanied two companies of 2/6th Bn Royal Warwickshires in a raid into the German front and support lines. The raiding party returned with prisoners from three regiments and two separate divisions, indicating that the German lines were packed ready for an attack. Indeed, the prisoners were anxious to be taken to the rear because they knew the German bombardment was due at 04.40 the following morning, 21 March. Unfortunately, this priceless information was not widely disseminated before the attack (the Battle of St Quentin) began.

==== Spring Offensive ====
The Germans launched their Spring Offensive on 21 March 1918, in thick mist following a heavy bombardment, and quickly overran the British forward zone before advancing to attack the main defences in the battle zone. 2/4th Battalion Oxfordshire and Buckinghamshire Light Infantry (OBLI) held out to the last in Enghien Redoubt in the forward zone until 16.30, slowing the advance against 61st (2d SM) Division. With communications cut by the barrage, 61st Division's companies at first found it impossible to obtain instructions. 476th Field Coy was eventually ordered to withdraw to Beauvois but was stopped on the way to erect defensive wire round Blackhill Redoubt. 478th Field Coy endeavoured to keep contact between 2/5th Bn Gloucesters holding the battle zone behind 2/4th OBLI and the 1/8th Bn Argyll and Sutherland Highlanders in Spooner Redoubt on the division's threatened left flank. As the mist cleared, the company brought down rifle fire to assist a field gun in repelling one German attack, and at dusk sent out fighting patrols with 1/8th Argylls that found the enemy in great strength. 479th Field Coy's HQ at The Quarry had been hit during the opening bombardment, and the company manned the lip of the quarry when the shelling stopped. Once the mist cleared the company was attacked by five German ground-attack aircraft. It sent up a party of men to join an abortive attempt to get through to Enghein Redoubt, but otherwise watched the battle develop. Though heavily attacked, 61st Division managed to keep its battle zone on the Holnon Plateau intact until nightfall.

German attempts to 'bomb' their way into the Quarry during the night were repulsed, but during the next day, 61st Division was pushed south-westwards away from its neighbouring division. All three field companies had been extricated from the battle zone and were assembled at Beauvois early in the morning. In the afternoon, they moved to Voyennes and demolition parties went to take over the bridges there and at Offoy from 1st Siege Company, Royal Anglesey RE. At 18.00, German cavalry was reported to be coming down the main roads and the field companies were ordered to man the bridgeheads at both places, with 479th Fd Coy at Buny, just east of Voyennes, 476th Fd Coy at Offoy, and 478th Fd Coy positioned midway between them in support. At 23.00, the two bridges at Offoy were destroyed by Lt Powell of 476th Fd Coy. 479th Field Coy was relieved by 20th (Light) Division during the night, and that formation's engineers subsequently completed the demolitions at Voyennes. All three field companies assembled at Nesle by 07.00 the next morning (23 March), and in the afternoon were made responsible for their own defence there under command of 20th (L) Division. Under the command of Maj M. Whitwell of 478th Fd Coy they placed an outpost round the town, barricaded the buildings, dug trenches, and did as much as possible to put the place into a state of defence while a counter-attack was launched through their positions to delay the enemy. The sappers were withdrawn to Billancourt in the afternoon, to march back through Rouvroy. On 26 March, the remnants of 61st (SM) Division, together with the rest of XVIII Corps, was assembled at Roye to maintain contact with the French Army, with 61st Divisional RE at Mézières. While the infantry attempted counter-attacks, the sappers dug and then held fall-back lines near Marcelcave, which came under heavy bombardment. From these trenches on 30 March 476th Fd Coy opened fire on enemy troops coming over the ridge and stopped them until Australian troops and dismounted cavalry arrived to restore the position. The exhausted division was eventually relieved that night.

61st Divisional RE went to rest billets at Gentelles near Amiens, and later moved north to Metigny. It entrained for Steenbecque on 10–11 April when 61st (2nd SM) Division went back into the line, to relieve the hard-pressed 51st (Highland) Division on the River Lys during the second phase of the German offensive. The sappers started work on fall-back positions along the River Clarence and Lys Canal, and prepared the bridges at St Venant for demolition. During 12 April, the enemy almost reached the Clarence, but the breakthrough was halted and a defence line patched up. The heaviest fighting shifted away from 61st Division's front and by 14 April the sappers were strengthening these positions and building footbridges over the rivers to ease movement. For the rest of the month, 61st (SM) Divisional RE (together with the pioneers of 1/5th DCLI, when they were not required as divisional infantry reserve) worked on the Robecq–St Venant (or Amusoires) line. At dawn, on 23 April, six sappers of 479th Fd Coy joined 2/5th Gloucesters to lead parties carrying trench bridges for a small attack to eliminate a German salient in the line.

61st (2nd SM) Division was now so exhausted and weak in numbers that it played little part in the fighting for months. The divisional engineers remained in the St Venant area until July, elaborating the forward defences, working on the Busnes–Steenbecque reserve line in rear, and building bridges across the network of rivers and canals. There was still occasional shelling and a few casualties were suffered, but the sector was generally quiet. On 2 July, Maj O.S. Davies, who had sometimes deputised as CRE, left 479th Fd Coy on promotion to CRE of 73rd Division at home, moving back to 66th (2nd East Lancashire) Division on the Western Front in September.

==== Hundred Days ====
Towards the end of July, the reinforced 61st (2nd SM) Division left the St Venant area for Hazebrouck and the field companies moved out on 22 July, moving on again to Ham on 31 July. Here, the division rejoined Fifth Army. The Allies began their final offensive (the Hundred Days Offensive) on 8 August, and 184th Bde carried out a small advance over the Plate Breque river on 11 August with help from 479th Fd Coy. Fifth Army began following the retreating enemy on 18 August. The field companies stopped work on camps and defence lines and began building bridges and improving roads to aid the advance. By the end of the month, the division had advanced to the Nieppe Forest, where 476th Fd Coy was building a new HQ at Croix Marraise. Progress slowed in early September, but the sappers continued preparing bridges, camps and supply dumps around Merville for the next advance.

The Allies carried out a coordinated series of attacks along the Western Front on 26–29 September and Fifth Army renewed its advance on 2 October, 61st (2nd SM) Division carrying out a minor operation. The division was then switched south to Third Army and, while it was in reserve, the sappers laid tracks from Anneux and Fontaine towards Cambrai for the advancing troops, and improved billets at Rieux before moving into recently captured Cambrai. On 7 October Maj M. Whitwell of 479th Fd Co was promoted to CRE of 73rd Division. Preparations for the Battle of the Selle began on 22 October, with the field companies making footbridges for the assault crossing of the Écaillon stream. When the attack went in on 24 October, 476th and 478th Fd Coys laid the bridges for 182nd and 183rd Bdes respectively. Although 183rd Bde got across without much trouble, 182nd found the banks of the stream blocked by uncut wire and was thrown back with heavy casualties, the bridges being lost. In the afternoon, the reserve brigade, 184th, passed through 183rd Bde to exploit the success while 479th Fd Coy repaired artillery bridges to keep the advance going.

The next obstacle was the River Rhonelle, though 183rd Bde already held a small bridgehead over it near Artres, wired in with the help of 476th Fd Coy. 61st (2nd SM) Division made its attack on 1 November as part of the Battle of Valenciennes. Once again, the sappers prepared footbridges and ladders. 182nd Brigade made the main attack at Artres, silently crossing the footbridges laid by 476th Fd Coy before zero hour and forming up its leading battalions on the far side by 04.30. The advance went well at first: Maresches was entered by 07.15 and many prisoners were taken. The brigade was then checked by machine gun fire from St Hubert, but except for a small are round this village the objective was taken by 08.30 and 183rd Be began crossing the Rhonelle over ladder-bridges. However, the division's left was thrown back at 09.30 by a German counter-attack led by captured British tanks. An attempt by 184th Bde to attack at 19.30 was stopped by the machine guns at St Hubert and further operations were postponed for the day. 476th and 478th Field Coy completed two Weldon trestle bridges and additional footbridges across the river that night; 479th Fd Coy attempted to place a heavy bridge, but was stopped by enemy shellfire.

After crossing the Rhonelle, 61st Division was relieved, and halted south of Valenciennes along the Ecallion. The field companies were undergoing inspections and training when hostilities ended at 11.00 on 11 November as the Armistice with Germany came into force. By 17 November, the division had moved back to Cambrai and at the end of the month went into winter quarters outside Doullens, where the sappers were kept busy erecting Nissen huts and improving the billets. Demobilisation got under way during January 1919 and the field companies were reduced to cadre strength between March and May. Only a few equipment guards remained by July.

==== Commanders ====
The following officers served as CRE of 61st (2nd South Midland) Division during World War I:

- Lt-Col J.L.V.S. Williams, TD, appointed 12 September 1914 from command of 1st SM Field Company; CRE 71st Division in UK from November 1916
- Maj Owen S. Davies (479th Fd Coy), acting from 19 September 1916
- Lt-Col G.E.J. Durnford, appointed 2 October 1916

== Interwar ==
The TF was reconstituted on 7 February 1920 and reorganised as the Territorial Army (TA) the following year, when the divisional engineers were organised as follows:

- 48th (SM) Divisional HQRE at 32 Park Row, Bristol
- 224th (South Midland) Field Company at Bristol
- 225th (South Midland) Field Company at Drill Hall, Holly Lane, Erdington, Birmingham
- 226th (South Midland) Field Company at 61 Tilehurst Road, Reading, Berkshire
- 227th (South Midland) Field Park Company at Bristol; merged into Divisional HQRE 1924; reformed at Birmingham 1939

The RE signal companies were transferred to the new Royal Corps of Signals formed in 1920.

Cotham School Cadet Corps was affiliated to the unit in the 1920s but had disappeared before World War II.

== World War II ==
=== Mobilisation ===
In the period of rearmament before World War II, the TA began forming duplicate units and formations. Once again, the 48th formed a duplicate division numbered 61st Division. The process was still going on when war broke out: As the TA was embodied on 1 September 1939, the duplicate field companies received their designations:

- 224th Duplicate Fd Coy (Lydney and Gloucester) became 266th Fd Coy
- 225th Duplicate Fd Coy (Birmingham) became 267th Fd Coy
- 226th Duplicate Fd Coy (Reading) became 268th Fd Coy

48th Division's RE companies mobilised at their peacetime depots, those destined for the 61st Division at Olton.

=== 48th (South Midland) Divisional RE ===
48th (South Midland) Division's WWII formation sign.

On 11 September 1939, 48th (SM) Divisional RE concentrated in Berkshire, with HQ and two companies at Northgate House in Faringdon, 226th Fd Coy at Newbury, later at Stanford-in-the-Vale, and 227th Fd Park Coy at Great Coxwell, later at Longworth. The companies carried out training and digging defences. HQRE spent some time at Wallingford, then moved back to Faringdon, while 224th Fd Coy went into billets at Lechlade. On 30 November, advance parties began moving to Southampton prepare for embarkation.

48th (SM) Division's units proceeded to France and after concentration the division joined I Corps of the new BEF in France on 5 January 1940 – the first TA division to arrive. 48th (SM) Divisional RE was commanded by Lt-Col H.E. Moore as CRE. General Headquarters had a policy of exchanging units between Regular and TA formations to equalise the level of training, and on 16 February 225th Fd Coy transferred to 4th Division, the 48th receiving the Regular 9th Fd Coy in exchange.

==== Battle of France ====
When the Phoney War ended and the Germans attacked in May 1940, opening the Battle of France, the BEF moved into Belgium according to plan and took up positions on the Dyle on 13 May, with 48th and 4th Divisions in reserve. But the French were unable to come into line before the leading German troops arrived, and fell back, despite support from 48th Division, so the BEF had to fall back in conformity. Over the next three days the BEF withdrew in bounds to successive river lines.

By 18 May, the 48th was on the line of the Dendre, and on 21 May it was on the Escaut, in each case holding the right flank, and was growing tired from the marching. It saw some heavy fighting on the Escaut, and then had to fall back again to the 'Canal Line' facing west and south as the BEF was forced to fight on two fronts. 48th Division was then ordered to pull back and hold the Cassel and Hazebrouck area in front of Dunkirk. By 26 May, the Germans had reached the sea and the BEF was cut off: the decision was made to evacuate it through Dunkirk (Operation Dynamo). All next day, 48th Division fought hard to hold Cassel and its widely stretched line protecting the west flank of the Dunkirk 'pocket'. By the end of 28 May, the division's positions were crumbling and the division was ordered to retire. The order did not reach the garrison of Cassel, which delayed the German for a further day. Finally the survivors of the division disengaged and moved into the bridgehead to await evacuation. The division left on 31 May.

==== Home Defence ====
After Dunkirk, the UK was threatened with imminent invasion. On its return the division's units were widely scattered across the west of the country: HQRE was at Monmouth until 2 July, when it moved to Bradford-on-Avon, while 9th Fd Coy was at Chipping Sodbury, 224th at Frome, 226th at Sherston and 227th at Gorsey, with all the companies engaged in building roadblocks. On 5 July, the division was assigned to South West Area (Devon) in Southern Command and the RE began moving to Lydford. The CRE, Col H.E. Moore, reconnoitred a proposed anti-tank (A/T) line from Exeter to Launceston and the OC 226th Fd Coy reconnoitred an A/T 'island' at Okehampton. The companies spent August and September laying land mines and A/T flame traps on the beaches of the West Country, and preparing bridges for demolition. Colonel Moore was sent to the War Office as Assistant Director of Fortifications and Works and was succeeded as CRE by Lt-Col J.F.C. Holland. At the beginning of October, Divisional HQ moved to winter quarters at Crediton with HQRE established in a house on North Street.

In the spring of 1941, 48th (SM) Divisional RE assisted the new Devon and Cornwall County Division (D&C Division), a coast defence formation that had no RE of its own. D&C Division was concerned to have exits from potential landing beaches blocked to vehicles (with Slapton Sands as a priority), and for inland demolitions to be prepared to block an enemy advance. In June, Lt-Col Holland left to become Deputy Chef Engineer for Northern Command and was replaced by Lt-Col C.J. Gardiner.

In November 1941, 48th (SM) Division was placed on a lower establishment. For the divisional engineers this meant that 9th Fd Coy left in November and went to the newly formed 1st Airborne Division. The division moved to Lincolnshire under I Corps District, with HQRE at Heighington, where 754th Army Fd Coy was attached to 48th (SM) Divisional RE from the Lincolnshire County Division. The sappers continued working on coastal defences around Skegness and taking part in training exercises during 1942. In August and September, 754th Army Fd Coy and 227th Fd Pk Coy began to mobilise for overseas service.

The division was further reduced in status when it became 48th Reserve Division in December 1942. Its role was now to train reinforcements and it never went overseas again. In late 1942, 48th Divisional RE was sent some 250 infantry recruits to form into a new 616th Corps Fd Coy and 619th Corps Fd Pk Coy; these later served with 38th (Welsh) Infantry Division and 4th GHQTRE respectively. Having completed their mobilisation, 754th Army Fd Coy and 227th Fd Pk Coy (see below) left in January 1943. The 227th was replaced by a smaller Field Stores Section. 224th Field Coy left for VIII Corps Troops RE in March 1943, leaving the divisional engineers with only a single company (226th). The following month Lt-Col Gardiner left to become CRE of 59th (Staffordshire) Infantry Division and Lt-Col R.C. Graham took over.

HQRE 48th Division was disbanded on 10 February 1944, leaving just the divisional RE stores section (though 792 Fd Coy joined the division in May 1945, after the end of the war in Europe). Lieutenant-Col Graham was posted to Supreme Headquarters Allied Expeditionary Force

=== 48th GHQ Troops RE ===
In line with the RE practice of retaining numbers from disbanded divisions for freestanding HQs, the disbandment of 48th (SM) Division's HQRE was quickly followed by the creation of 48th GHQ Troops RE (48th GHQTRE) under Lt-Col G.H. Edwards. In May 1944, this was at Putney in South London, later at Iver, Buckinghamshire, mobilising for overseas service. Lieutenant-Col Edwards spent much of his time representing the Chief Engineer of 21st Army Group at various meetings. Once the Allied invasion of Normandy (Operation Overlord) began on 6 June, 48th GHQTRE prepared to cross with the follow-up force. On 25 June, Nos 2 and 3 Dog Platoons were placed under its command (the dogs were being trained to detect mines) and in July and August it oversaw the mobilisation of a group of Artizan Works Companies, RE, as Army Troops Companies for 21st Army Group. (Note: 727 Artizan Works Coy was disbanded and 672, 695, 705 and 760 were converted.) On 2 October, 48th GHQTRE was ordered to move to its marshalling area, and on 11 October it disembarked in France.

48th GHQTRE moved up to Brussels on 22 October, where it was ordered to form four works sections (228, 229, 230 and 231) and a stores section (No 34) from the personnel of 858 Quarrying Company, RE. Despite shortages of officers and RE specialists, as well as vehicles and equipment, the first of these was completed by the end of November and they were posted to the Lines of Communications RE during December. 48th GHQTRE was then tasked with reforming and training the 1st Engineer Battalion of the Belgian Army at Knokke. This work continued in early 1945 with the 2nd and 3rd Battalions; by early April, the Belgian Government had issued calling-up papers for a fourth engineer battalion, which was to be trained in mine-lifting, a major task in the liberated areas of Belgium and the Netherlands. This work continued after VE Day until August 1945, when the remaining personnel of 48th GHQTRE were transferred to the RE Training School at Knokke, and the headquarters was disbanded on 31 August.

=== 224th (South Midland) Field Company ===
VIII Corps' formation sign.

224th (SM) Field Coy joined VIII Corps Troops, RE (VIII CTRE) in March 1943. By July, VIII Corps formed part of Second Army in 21st Army Group, training for Operation Overlord.

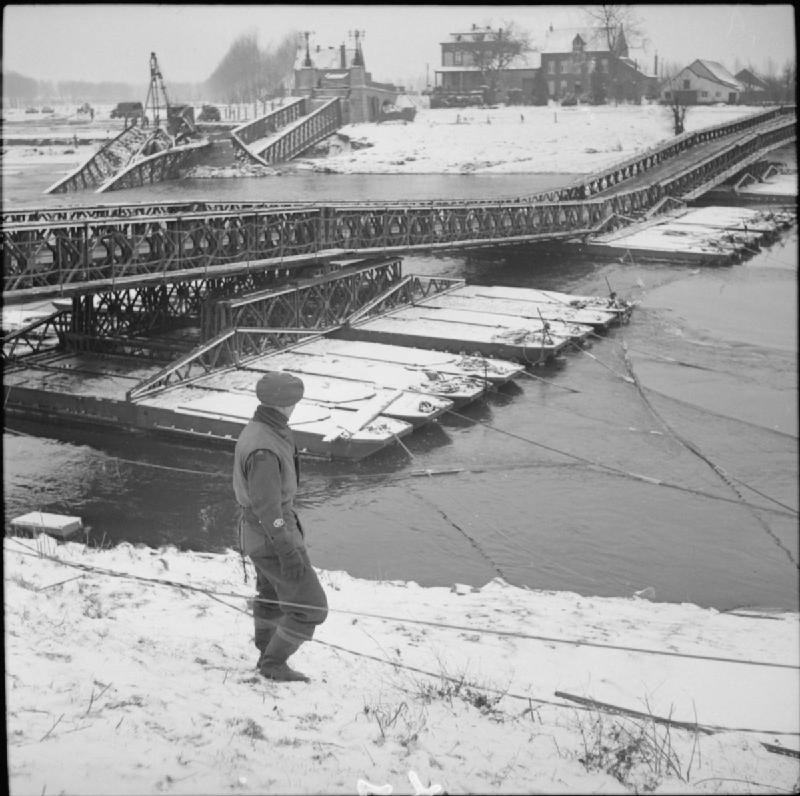
'Bristol Bridge' built over the Maas by 224th (SM) Fd Co.

After D-Day, VIII CTRE was engaged in mine clearance until the breakout from the Normandy beachhead, after which it erected a large number of bridges, including a noteworthy Class 70 bridge (the heaviest class of Bailey bridge) over the Seine at Mantes-Gassicourt. In January 1945, 224th (SM) Fd Co built 'Bristol Bridge' over the Maas at Maeseyk. VIII CTRE was loaned to XII Corps for the assault crossing of the Rhine (Operation Plunder), completing the first British-built bridge over the river. The unit continued supporting the advance by Second Army and Ninth US Army. It was heavily involved in the assault crossing of the Elbe (Operation Constellation), operating ferries as well as bridgebuilding, and suffering numerous casualties from accurate shelling and air attacks by jet fighters.

The German surrender at Lüneburg Heath on 4 May did not end the work for the sappers: for many months they were engaged in repair and restoration of essential services behind the armies and in the occupied zone of Germany.

=== 225th (South Midland) Field Company ===
4th Division's formation sign.

225th (SM) Field Coy was with 4th Division alongside 48th (SM) Division on the Dyle Line in May 1940, then as the BEF was forced to withdraw it found itself south of Ypres on 26 May. 4th Divisional RE, acting as infantry, took up a defensive position screening Warneton, but the move took all night on the congested roads and the companies deployed without having time to rest or dig in. At 09.00 on 27 May the enemy attacked the left flank, held by 225th (SM) Fd Coy as they were digging in, but were held off until 11.00 while the rest of the divisional RE deployed. Then, almost surrounded, the company disengaged and withdrew over flat open ground to take post on the left of the new line, protecting Warneton bridge over which troops were still retreating. At 15.30 the CO of the 13th/18th Royal Hussars arrived, and at 16.40 he launched a 'spirited' counter-attack. For this, he only had his HQ (two light tanks and one carrier) and one 10-man platoon of 6th Bn Black Watch: the bulk of the infantry for this attack were the three RE companies. The frontage of the attack was 2,000 yards (1,800 m) and the ground was dead flat for 3,000 yards (2,700 m) as far as the dry Ypres–Comines Canal. The attack was made in echelon from the right, so 225th Fd Coy was about 800 yards (730 m) behind the tanks and leading troops. The company passed through a heavy barrage and reached its objective. The attack, described by the RE historian as 'probably unique as an example of divisional RE being used as a whole for offensive action', succeeded in driving the enemy back and consolidating a line on the Kortekeer River, keeping them out of range of Warneton bridge while the BEF's withdrawal continued. Next day 4th Division was moved into the Dunkirk pocket to form part of the rearguard. It was one of the last formations evacuated from the beaches and mole at Dunkirk.

225th (SM) Field Coy remained with the division for the rest of the war. 4th Division landed in North Africa in March 1943 for the final stages of the Tunisian campaign. It was engaged in heavy fighting, and while clearing road blocks on a bridge across the Oued Hamar an entire working party from 225th (SM) Fd Coy was killed by a booby-trap; a further 37 booby-traps were found on that one bridge, which took 8 hours to clear.

4th Division landed in Italy in December 1943 and was involved in the final assault on Monte Cassino. On the night of 12/13 May 1944, 7th and 225th Fd Coys built an 80 feet (24 m) Class 30 Bailey bridge across the Rapido. The work was carried out under constant fire, and 15 sappers were killed and 57 wounded from the two companies. Bridgebuilding and road making were a feature of the Italian campaign. During the rest of the year, 4th Division fought in the actions of the Trasimene Line, Arezzo, the advance to Florence and the Rimini Line. In December it was sent to Greece, where civil war had broken out after the German withdrawal. During the initial fighting in Athens 4th Divisional RE were chiefly employed in guarding prisoners of war and sending out small parties to demolish road blocks and clear mines and booby-traps, suffering a considerable number of casualties. After a truce was arranged, the field companies fanned out with the infantry brigade groups to clear the roads of mines, snow and landslides, and to rebuild bridges. At the end of the war, the divisional RE was rebuilding infrastructure that had been demolished by the retreating Germans, and a detachment went to Crete to supervise Germans engineers in mine-lifting (whose methods were described as 'spectacular rather than efficient').

=== 227th (South Midland) Field Park Company ===
By 1944, 227th (SM) Company provided the field park company of 6th Army Troops RE (6th ATRE). ATREs were independent battalion-sized RE units operating at army or corps level specialising in river crossings. In the summer of 1944, 6th ATRE was deployed to North West Europe, where it formed part of the massive concentration of RE bridging resources for Operation Market Garden. In the event, most of the major crossings were captured intact and the necessary bridging was carried out by corps and divisional sappers. However, the ultimate prize, the bridges over the Nederrijn at Arnhem could not be achieved, and the operation failed.

In preparation for the assault crossing of the Rhine (Operation Plunder), 6th ATRE built two major bridges over the Maas to improve communications. The unit was then assigned to XXX Corps for 'Plunder'. For the Class 40 pontoon bridge at Rees, codenamed 'Westminster', 227th (SM) Field Park Coy worked on the bridge dump, cutting the deck surfaces to size and welding the landing bays. For the assault crossing of the Elbe (Operation Constellation) 6th ATRE was responsible for running ferries and constructing the necessary approaches.

On 5 July 1945, 6th ATRE arrived in the Netherlands to take over technical supervision of mine disposal work being carried out by a German engineer brigade.

=== 61st Divisional RE ===
61st Division's WWII formation sign.

Formed in 1939, 61st Divisional RE was constituted as follows:

- 266 Fd Coy at Olton
- 267 Fd Coy at Olton
- 268 Fd Coy at Olton, mobilised with GHQ, joined division 31 December 1939
- 269 Fd Pk Coy at Olton, mobilised with GHQ, joined division 18 January 1940

61st Division never served outside the United Kingdom. It was sent to Northern Ireland in June 1940 during the post-Dunkirk invasion crisis, remaining there until February 1943.

61st Division did appear in 21st Army Group's proposed order of battle in the summer of 1943, but it was later replaced by veteran formations brought back from the Mediterranean theatre before Operation Overlord was launched. It remained in reserve in the UK at full establishment. All the divisional RE units were disbanded after September 1945.

== Postwar ==
When the TA was reconstituted on 1 January 1947, the South Midland engineers were reformed as two units (now termed 'regiments'), one at Bristol and one at Birmingham, each deriving its seniority from the 2nd Gloucestershire EVC of 1861. The Bristol unit was assigned the number 111 in the new TA nomenclature, but in common with several other RE units it appears to have retained its old number:

48th (South Midland) GHQTRE (111 Field Engineer Regiment, RE)

- HQ at Bristol
- 205 Field Squadron
- 224 Field Squadron
- 349 Field Squadron
- 227 Field Park Squadron

112 Construction Regiment, RE

- HQ at Birmingham
- 225 Construction Squadron
- 267 Construction Squadron
- 306 Construction Squadron
- 318 Plant Squadron

226 Field Squadron, reformed at Oxford, was assigned to 110 Field Engineer Regiment at Bath, Somerset, the former 43rd (Wessex) Divisional Engineers.

When Engineer Groups were formed in the TA in 1948, 48th (SM) GHQTRE (111 Fd Rgt) was assigned to 26 Engineer Group headquartered at Salisbury in Southern Command, and 112 Construction Rgt to 23 Engineer Group at Hereford in Western Command.

However, both regiments and their squadrons were disbanded in 1950–51 and their numbers were transferred to units of the Army Emergency Reserve. The only TA squadron that survived was 225, which was transferred to 127 Construction Regiment (the former 46th (North Midland) Divisional Engineers). 127 Construction Regiment was reconstituted as 48th (South Midland) Division/District RE in 1961 with the following organisation:

- 212 Field Squadron
- 225 Field Squadron
- 267 Field Squadron

This regiment too was disbanded in 1967 when the TA was reduced into the Territorial and Army Volunteer Reserve. The regimental and squadron numbers were transferred to the Militia and 225 (City of Birmingham) Field Squadron (Militia) today exists as a subunit of the Royal Monmouthshire Royal Engineers.

A new 111 Regiment RE (Volunteers) existed from 1967 to 1995 with 120 and 130 Field Sqns.

== Honorary Colonels ==
The following officers served as Honorary Colonel of the unit:

- Maj-Gen Richard Luard, appointed on 7 December 1881.
- Gen Sir Richard Harrison appointed on 27 November 1895.
- Maj-Gen James Gascoyne-Cecil, 4th Marquess of Salisbury, KG, GCVO, CB, TD, appointed on 20 August 1927.
- Lt-Col Sir John Lloyd Vaughan Seymour-Williams, KBE, TD, the former OC of 1st SM Fd Coy and CRE of 61st Divisional Engineers, appointed on 11 March 1933.
