= 264th (Sussex) Field Company, Royal Engineers =

264th (Sussex) Field Company, RE
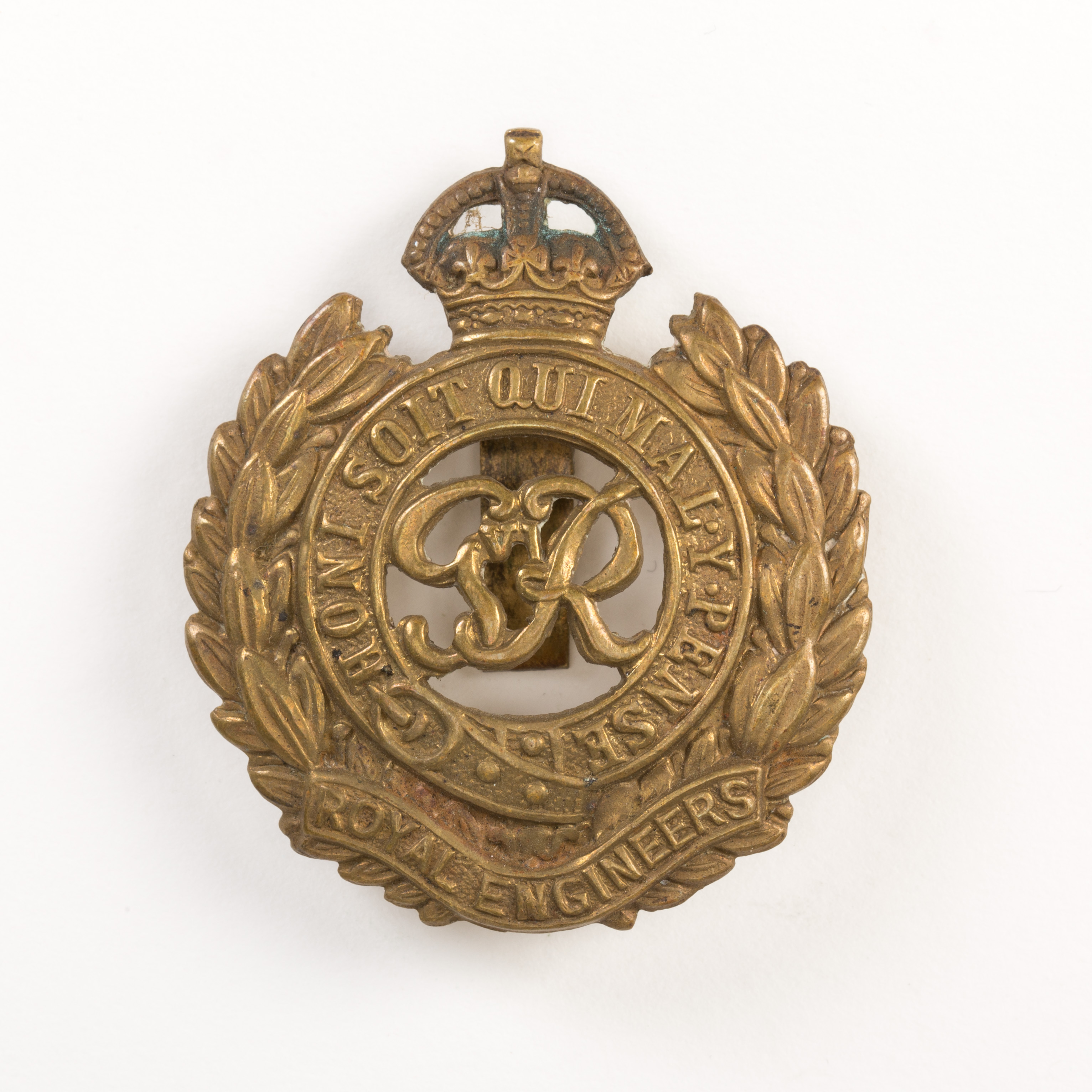
- RE Cap badge (King George VI cipher)
- Active: 1939–1946
- Country: United Kingdom
- Branch: Territorial Army
- Role: Field engineers
- Part of: 12th (Eastern) Divisional Royal Engineers; XII CTRE; VIII CTRE; 2nd GHQTRE
- Garrison/HQ: Seaford, East Sussex
- Engagements: Battle of France; Tunisian Campaign; Italian Campaign; Yugoslavia; North West Europe

264th (Sussex) Field Company was a Territorial Army (TA) unit of Britain's Royal Engineers (RE) raised in Sussex just before the outbreak of the Second World War. It formed part of 12th (Eastern) Infantry Division and went with it to France early in 1940. After being evacuated back to the UK and serving in home defence it was sent to North Africa, where it participated in the Tunisian Campaign. It then joined in the Italian Campaign, including sending a detachment to Yugoslavia, before moving to Germany for the final stages of the war. The company was disbanded in 1946.

== Mobilisation ==
Following the Munich Crisis the TA was doubled in size and 12th (Eastern) Infantry Division was formed as a duplicate of 44th (Home Counties) Division. 264 (Sussex) Field Company, Royal Engineers was raised from recruits obtained from Seaford, Lewes and Newhaven by 210 (Sussex) Field Company of 44th (HC) Divisional Engineers. It was embodied at Seaford on the outbreak of war, separated from 210 Fd Co on 5 September and 12th (Eastern) Infantry Division became active on 7 October 1939. The unit moved to Milton Barracks, Gravesend, to guard the airport, undergo training, and receive reinforcements.

== Battle of France ==
12th (Eastern) Divisional sign.

12th (E) Divisional RE sailed from Gravesend and arrived at Le Havre on 20 April. The company was then sent by rail to Abancourt, where it was put to building camps. When the German invasion began and 12th (E) Division was ordered to concentrate at Amiens. The RE were entrained but never reached Amiens, which was already on fire after air raids. They were then withdrawn via Le Mans to Blain on the Atlantic coast, where they began building a new camp at Chateau Pont Pietin. The infantry of 12th (E) Division fought as part of 'Petreforce', holding up the German advance at the coast of heavy casualties before being evacuated through Dunkirk. The rest of the BEF remaining on the Atlantic coast then began to be evacuated through Cherbourg Naval Base, 12th (E) Divisional RE moving via Caen to get there early on 7 June. They embarked on the RMS Duke of Argyll and arrived at Southampton that evening.

The divisional RE was moved to Hexham in Northumberland, then returned to the south coast to work on anti-invasion beach defences along the South Coast and inland stop lines in Sussex and Kent. The 12th (Eastern) Infantry Division was broken up on 10 July, so the survivors could help bring up other units up to full strength. The divisional RE was converted into XII Corps Troops, RE, (XII CTRE) the field companies formally being termed 'Army Field Companies'.

== Home Defence ==
XII Corps HQ was formed in Aldershot Command in July 1940. XII CTRE served with it for the rest of the war, with 264 Fd Co based at Mayfield, East Sussex, working on defence lines and anti-tank obstacles behind the coast. In January 1941 the company moved to Paignton in Devon, working on defences and clearing up after the Plymouth Blitz. In September it moved to Bridgwater in Somerset for training, and in December it transferred to VIII CTRE in Southern Command, with the company also being part of the War Office Reserve.

In July 1942 264 (S) A Fd Co joined the newly formed 2nd General Headquarters Troops RE (2nd GHQTRE). The rest of the unit was composed of Yorkshire companies formerly part of 49th (West Riding) Division. 2nd GHQTRE was assigned to First Army for the Allied landings in North Africa (Operation Torch). On 5 November 1942 the company was in billets in Tiverton, Devon, when embarkation orders arrived. It moved to Newport, Wales, where on 9 November it boarded the SS Orontes, which sailed on 14 November via Scottish waters for North Africa.

== Tunisia ==
The Torch landings began on 8 November, and 264 (Sussex) Fd Co disembarked at Algiers on 23 November. It moved by train to Constantine, dropping off No 1 Section to work on a base hospital, and went to Doukam de Kroub where the unit transport, which had landed later at Bougie, caught up. The company was employed on bomb disposal, building camps, field workshops and Prisoner-of-war camps, stone quarrying and water supply. No 1 Section rejoined from Guelma on 11 January, when the company was given responsibility with some of the South African Engineer Corps for opening a route for an armoured division along the Le Kroub–Guelma road.

On 31 March 1943 the company moved to Souk Ahras to work in the 18th Army Group camp, then at Haidra in April and Gafour in May, constructing camps, building bridges, clearing minefields and establishing water supplies. During the final operations against Tunis (Operation Vulcan), 2nd GHQTRE took over responsibility for routes behind the corps TREs. After the Axis surrender the unit continued its maintenance work with local labour at Pont du Fahs in June, and then moved to Tarif in July to study petrol distribution. Afterwards it built fuel pipelines from Bône harbour to various airfields. For the succeeding months the unit was engaged in mine clearance and dismantling Bailey bridges for re-use.

== Italy and Yugoslavia ==
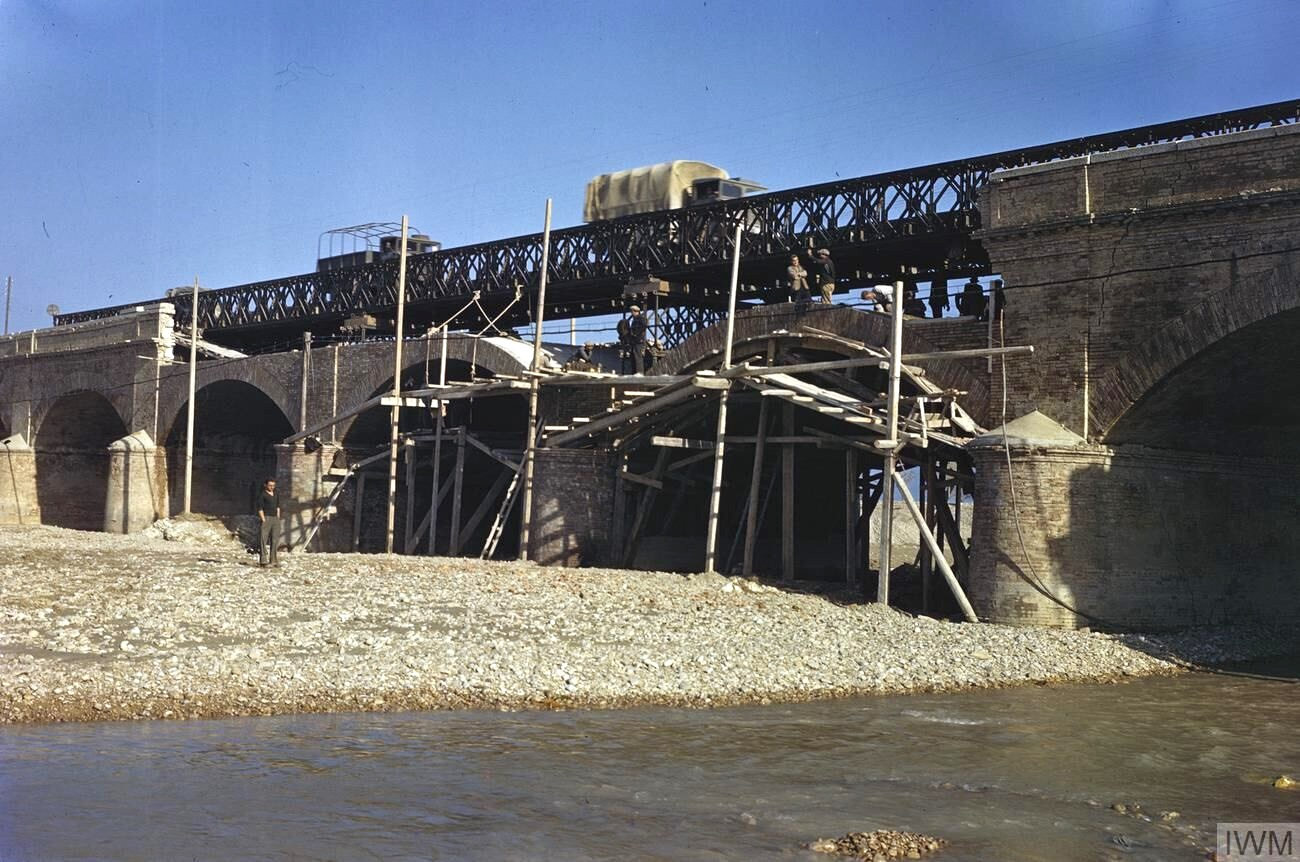
A demolished bridge in Italy repaired by the RE using Bailey sections

In November 1943 264 (S) Fd Co mobilised with new transport for a move to Italy, embarking on the Ville d'Oran at Philippeville on 5 December and landing at Taranto on 8 December to join 15th Army Group at Brindisi. The company then moved to Capua and spent the winter there working on water supplies, quarries, and Bailey bridges. Early in 1944 No 1 Platoon was detached to Force 133 (Special Operations Executive) on the island of Vis where it worked for several weeks with the Yugoslav Partisans on defence works and stripping a vineyard to establish an airfield. Water supply was critical and the platoon had to establish large storage tanks.

No 1 Platoon rejoined the company in late May 1944. In June the company was attached to 4th Indian Division for its advance through the mountains towards Florence, clearing mines and maintaining 'Blue Route'. The company moved steadily northwards, repairing bridges, with No 3 Platoon in the lead. By August the company was at Rome, where it joined I Canadian Corps, moving with it to Rimini by 24 September, where the company built an airstrip for Auster light aircraft. In October the company moved forwards once again, strengthening Bailey bridges erected by the front line engineers. On 11 November the unit built a Bailey bridge under fire at Portoforce, suffering some casualties. It spent the winter in the area of San Petro and then Ravenna, maintaining routes.

== North West Europe ==
In the winter of 1944–45 the Allies began Operation Goldflake, secretly transferring I Canadian Corps from Italy to reinforce 21st Army Group fighting in North West Europe. 2nd GHQTRE was along the units selected, and 264 Fd Co received its warning order on 13 March 1945. It embarked at Livorno for Marseille on 23 March, and later joined a road convoy for the five-day journey north. On 4 April it reached Zillebeke, where it overhauled its vehicles and came under the command of 1st Canadian Commander, Royal Engineers, Works. It was put to maintaining main supply routes including 'Victoria Up and Down' and bridges on 'Maple Leaf'.

As the war in Europe drew to a close in May, 264 Fd Co was engaged in dismantling bridges over the Rhine that were no longer required, and maintaining roads. It moved to Arnhem just after VE Day, and then to Meppen to convert a Bailey to two-way operation. It then moved into occupied Germany to clear demolished bridges and other obstructions to make the Ems–Weser Canal navigable, and repairing damaged autobahns.

Disbandment began in December 1945, with the last of the personnel being posted to 231 (West Riding) Fd Co in 2nd GHQTRE on 15 December. As a 2nd Line unit, 264 (Sussex) Fd Co was not reformed in the reconstituted TA in 1947, but a number of its veterans rejoined its original parent unit, 210 Field Squadron at Seaford.

== External sources ==
- Orders of Battle at Patriot Files
