= 72nd Division (United Kingdom) =

- Active: November 1916 - April 1918
- Country: United Kingdom
- Branch: British Army
- Type: Infantry
- Role: Home Defence and training

72nd Division was a short-lived infantry division of the British Army during World War I. It served in the Home Defence forces and never went overseas.

== Home defence ==
On the outbreak of World War I the Territorial Force (TF) immediately mobilised for home defence, but shortly afterwards (31 August 1914), its units were authorised to raise 2nd battalions formed from those men who had not volunteered for, or were not fit for, overseas service, together with new volunteers, while the 1st Line went overseas to supplement the Regulars. Early in 1915 the 2nd Line TF battalions were also raised to full strength to form new divisions, and began to form Reserve (3rd Line) units to supply drafts. The remaining Home Service men were separated out in May 1915 to form brigades of Coast Defence Battalions (termed Provisional Battalions from June 1915).

=== 8th Provisional Brigade ===
8th Provisional Brigade was formed mainly from details of regiments from the English Midlands. Brigadier-General Willoughby Thuillier assumed command on 8 September 1915 and established his headquarters at Westcliff-on-Sea, later moving to Southminster. By July 1916 the brigade was under the control of Northern Army of Home Forces, with the following units billeted across Essex:

- Brigade Headquarters: Maldon
- 8th Provisional Yeomanry Squadron
- 8th Provisional Cyclist Company
- 8th Provisional Battery Royal Field Artillery at Southminster
- 8th Provisional Brigade Ammunition Column RFA
- 8th Provisional Field Company Royal Engineers at Southminster
- 8th Provisional Signal Section RE at Maldon
- 28th Provisional Battalion (formed from home service details of 2/4th and 2/5th Battalions, Leicestershire Regiment, 2/4th and 2/5th Lincolnshire Regiment, and 2/5th and 2/6th Battalions South Staffordshire Regiment) at Tillingham
- 70th Provisional Battalion (formed from home service details of 5th and 6th Battalions, East Surrey Regiment) at Burnham-on-Crouch
- 81st Provisional Battalion (formed from home service details of 5th, 6th, 7th and 8th Bns, Royal Warwickshire Regiment) at Asheldham, later Southminster
- 83rd Provisional Battalion (formed from home service details of the 5th Battalion, Gloucestershire Regiment, 4th Battalion, Oxfordshire and Buckinghamshire Light Infantry and 4th Battalion, Royal Berkshire Regiment) at West Mersea
- 8th Provisional Field Ambulance Royal Army Medical Corps at Burnham
- 8th Provisional Brigade Train Army Service Corps (from North Midland Divisional Train) at Southminster

The following were also attached to 8th Provisional Bde:

- 1/8th (Cyclist) Battalion, Essex Regiment (until October 1918)
- 2/3rd Warwickshire Battery, Royal Field Artillery (from October 1915)

== 72nd Division formed ==
Late in 1916 the War Office decided to form three new home-service divisions and 72nd was the second of these, assembling in Somerset in November. The division was based on 8th Provisional Bde, which moved from Essex and provided four infantry battalions and many of the support units. (On 1 January 1917 these all received new designations and numbers.) In addition, 188th (2/1st Northumberland) Brigade, left over after the earlier disbandment of 63rd (2nd Northumbrian) Division, provided three battalions which joined 72nd Division. 65th (2nd Lowland) Division, 67th (2nd Home Counties) Division and 68th (2nd Welsh) Division provided the personnel for five artillery batteries, while Northern Command and Northern and Southern Armies each loaned a section of guns each until equipment could be issued to the new units. The division had the following composition:

=== Staff ===
- General Officer Commanding: Major-General F.S. Inglefield (3 November 1916 – 6 September 1917)
  Maj-Gen G.J. Cuthbert (6 September 1917 – 31 January 1918)
- General Staff Officer Grade 1: Lieutenant-Colonel T.E.L. Hill-Whitson
- Assistant-Adjutant and Quartermaster-General: Lt-Col A.W.B. Wallace
- HQ: Bath

=== 215th Brigade ===
215 Brigade was drawn from 8th Provisional Bde:

- GOC: Brigadier-General P.W. Hendry
- HQ: Bath
- 28th Provisional Battalion: became 13th Battalion, Lincolnshire Regiment 1 January 1917; left July 1917 and disbanded 31 October 1917
- 70th Provisional Battalion: became 15th Battalion, Royal Sussex Regiment 1 January 1917; disbanded about March 1918
- 81st Provisional Battalion: became 18th Battalion, Royal Warwickshire Regiment 1 January 1917; left December 1917 and disbanded 17 January 1918
- 258th (Infantry) Battalion, Training Reserve: joined by 23 July 1917; became 51st (Graduated) Battalion, Durham Light Infantry 1 November 1917
- 259th Battalion, Training Reserve: joined by 24 September 1917; became 51st (Graduated) Battalion, Royal Fusiliers 1 November 1917

=== 216th Brigade ===
216 Brigade was newly formed:

- GOC: Brigadier-General C.V. Humphrys (2 November 1916 – 5 February 1917)
  Brig-Gen G.M. Gloster (5 February 1917 – 10 March 1918)
- HQ: Weston-super-Mare
- 83rd Provisional Battalion: became 10th Battalion, Oxfordshire and Buckinghamshire Light Infantry 1 January 1917; left by July 1917 and disbanded 21 November 1917 with personnel drafted to other units in 216 Bde
- 10th (Home Service) Battalion, Somerset Light Infantry: newly raised at Weston; left July 1917 and disbanded November 1917
- 14th (Home Service) Battalion, King's Own Yorkshire Light Infantry: formerly 3rd (Home Service) Garrison Battalion, KOYLI; went to 69th Division.
- 261st Battalion, Training Reserve: joined by 23 July 1917; became 51st (Graduated) Battalion, Leicester Regiment; went to 69th Division
- 262nd Battalion, Training Reserve: joined by 9 July 1917; became 51st (Graduated) Battalion, Royal Warwickshire; went to 68th Division

=== 217th Brigade ===
217th Brigade was formed from battalions of the disbanding 188th (2/1st Northumberland) Brigade:

- GOC: Brigadier-General A.L. Macfie (1 November 1916 – 16 June 1917)
  Brig-Gen Douglas Campbell (16 June 1917 – 2 February 1918)
- HQ: Clevedon
- 2/4th Battalion, Northumberland Fusiliers; disbanded April or May 1918
- 2/5th Battalion, Northumberland Fusiliers; left by July 1917, disbanded January 1918
- 2/6th Battalion, Northumberland Fusiliers; left December 1917
- 264th Battalion, Training Reserve: joined by 9 July 1917; became 51st (Graduated) Battalion, King's Own Yorkshire Light Infantry; went to 69th Division
- 265th Battalion, Training Reserve: joined by 24 September 1917; became 52nd (Graduated) Battalion, Royal Fusiliers; went to 68th Division

=== Divisional mounted troops ===
- 8th Provisional Cyclist Company: became 72nd Divisional Cyclist Company Army Cyclist Corps (Home Service)

=== Royal Artillery ===
- Brigadier-General Royal Artillery: F.B. Johnstone
- HQ: Bridgwater
- CCCLII Field Brigade RFA:
  - A Battery (later 1210 Field Battery): formerly 8th Provisional Battery 6 × 18-pounder QF guns
  - B Battery: 6 × 18-pdr
  - C (Howitzer) Battery: 4 × QF 4.5-inch howitzer
- CCCLIII Field Brigade RFA:
  - A Battery: 6 × 18-pdr
  - B Battery: 6 × 18-pdr
  - C (Howitzer) Battery: 4 × 4.5 Howitzer
- 72nd Divisional Ammunition Column: formerly 8th Provisional Brigade Ammunition Column

=== Royal Engineers ===
- Commanding Royal Engineers: Lieutenant-Colonel A.O. Evans
- 3/1st Glamorgan Field Company, RE: became 550th Field Company
- 2/2nd Glamorgan Field Company, RE: became 551st Field Company
- 647th (South Midland) Field Company, RE: formerly 8th Provisional Field Company
- 72nd Divisional Signal Company: formerly 8th Provisional Signal Section

=== Medical services ===
- 8th Provisional Field Ambulance RAMC:
  - A Section: became 304th (South Midland) Field Ambulance
  - B Section: became 305th (South Midland) Field Ambulance
  - C Section: became 306th (South Midland) Field Ambulance
- 105th Sanitary Section
- 57th Mobile Veterinary Section Army Veterinary Corps

=== Transport ===
- 72nd Divisional Train:
  - 8th Provisional Brigade Company ASC: became 825th Horse Transport Company ASC
  - 826th, 827th and 828th HT Companies ASC: newly formed

== Service ==
After assembling in Somerset, the new division moved in January 1917 to Bedford, Wellingborough and Northampton to replace 62nd (2nd West Riding) Division, which had gone to the Western Front. In May 1917 the 72nd moved again, to East Anglia With its HQ at Ipswich, the division formed part of Southern Army of Home Forces, and was responsible for the coastal defences from the River Deben to Orford Ness. The division remained here for the remainder of its service.

The Military Service Act 1916 swept away the Home/Foreign service distinction, and all TF soldiers became liable for overseas service, if medically fit. Henceforth part of the role of the Home Service divisions was physical conditioning to render men fit for drafting overseas, alongside units of the Training Reserve. 'Graduated Battalions' of the Training Reserve were organised in four companies according to age, from 18 to 19 years. Recruits progressed from one to another company every three months, so that every three months there was a company of trained 19-year-old men available for drafting overseas. In July 1917 it was decided that the Graduated Battalions could serve in a Home Defence role while completing their training. Between July and September 1917, six Graduated Battalions replaced other units in 72nd Division, and in October these were affiliated to line regiments and adopted territorial designations.

== Disbandment ==
During October 1917 the War Office decided to break up the three home service divisions. A number of battalions of 72nd Division were disbanded, and on 21 December the War Office ordered the Commander-in-Chief, Home Forces, to break up the remainder of the division without delay. The Graduated Battalions transferred to other divisions and between January and April 1918 the remainder of the headquarters and supporting units were broken up.

The 72nd Division title has never been reactivated.

== See also ==
- List of British divisions in World War I

== Bibliography ==
- Maj A.F. Becke,History of the Great War: Order of Battle of Divisions, Part 2b: The 2nd-Line Territorial Force Divisions (57th–69th), with the Home-Service Divisions (72nd–74th) and 74th and 75th Divisions, London: HM Stationery Office, 1937/Uckfield: Naval & Military Press, 2007, ISBN 1-847347-39-8.
- J.B.M. Frederick, Lineage Book of British Land Forces 1660–1978, Vol I, Wakefield: Microform Academic, 1984, ISBN 1-85117-007-3.
- Brig E.A. James, British Regiments 1914–18, London: Samson Books, 1978, ISBN 0-906304-03-2/Uckfield: Naval & Military Press, 2001, ISBN 978-1-84342-197-9.
- War Office, Army Council Instructions Issued During January 1916, London: HM Stationery Office, 1916.

=== External links ===
- Chris Baker, The Long, Long Trail
- The Regimental Warpath 1914–1918
- David Porter's work on Provisional Brigades at Great War Forum
