= 1st Gloucestershire Engineer Volunteer Corps =

1st Gloucestershire Engineer Volunteer Corps 1st Gloucestershire (The Western Counties) Engineer Volunteers
- Active: 28 January 1861–1908
- Country: United Kingdom
- Branch: Volunteer Force
- Role: Field engineers
- Garrison/HQ: Gloucester; Bristol; Cheltenham
- Engagements: Second Boer War

The 1st Gloucestershire Engineer Volunteer Corps was a Volunteer unit of Britain's Royal Engineers, serving from 1861 to 1908. A detachment of the unit served in the Second Boer War. Although the unit itself did not transfer to the Territorial Force in 1908, several descendant units did so, deriving their seniority from the 1st Gloucesters.

== History ==
The enthusiasm for the Volunteer movement following an invasion scare in 1859 saw the creation of many Rifle, Artillery and Engineer Volunteer units composed of part-time soldiers eager to supplement the Regular British Army in time of need. Two such units were the 1st Gloucestershire Engineer Volunteer Corps (EVC) formed at Gloucester on 28 January 1861, and the 2nd Gloucestershire EVC formed at Bristol on 10 April 1861 by employees of the Bristol and Exeter Railway. Administratively, the 1st Gloucester EVC was attached to the 1st Administrative Battalion, Gloucestershire Rifle Volunteer Corps (later the 5th Battalion, Gloucestershire Regiment) and the 2nd EVC was attached to the 1st Gloucestershire Artillery Volunteers. However, in July 1867 they were both included in a new 1st Administrative Battalion of Gloucestershire Engineer Volunteers, with its headquarters at Bristol. The Administrative Battalion also included the 1st Somersetshire EVC when that was formed the following year, and the 1st Devonshire EVC joined in 1869. Captain James Henry Dowling of the Royal Glamorgan Militia was appointed to command the 1st Gloucester EVC on 11 July 1861, and was promoted to lieutenant-colonel to command the 1st Admin Bn on 28 May 1870.

With the reorganisation of the Volunteer Force in 1880, the Gloucestershire Admin Bn was consolidated as the 1st Gloucestershire (Gloucester, Somerset and Devon) EVC, with the 1st Devon providing E Company at Torquay and F Company at Exeter, and the 1st Somerset providing G and H Companies at Nailsea and I Company at Weston-super-Mare. However, in 1881, the 2nd Gloucestershire left the battalion and became an independent unit once more, as the 2nd Gloucestershire (The Bristol) EVC.

When Lt-Gen Sir Andrew Clarke, Inspector-General of Fortifications 1882–6, did not have enough Regular Royal Engineers (RE) to man the fixed mines being installed to defend British seaports, he utilised the Volunteer Engineers for this task. After successful trials, the system was rolled out to ports around the country. In 1885, the 1st Gloucestershire Engineers formed a submarine mining company at Cardiff to cover the Severn Estuary.

The EVC titles were abandoned in 1888, when the unit's title became 1st Gloucestershire (The Western Counties) Engineer Volunteers, Royal Engineers. At the same time, the submarine miners were constituted into a separate branch of the RE Volunteers, and the Cardiff company became independent as the Severn Division Submarine Miners.

In July 1889, the 1st Gloucesters moved their HQ to Cheltenham, and at the same time the Devon and Somerset companies were removed and constituted as a separate 1st Devonshire and Somersetshire Engineer Volunteers, with its HQ at Exeter. All the Engineer Volunteers' titles were changed to simply 'Royal Engineers (Volunteers)' in 1896. The Cheltenham College Cadet Corps was attached to the unit.

The 1st Gloucestershire RE (V) sent a detachment to assist the regular REs during the Second Boer War in 1901.

== Territorial Force ==
When the Volunteers were subsumed into the new Territorial Force (TF) in 1908, only F Company of the 1st Gloucester RE (V) transferred to the new organisation, becoming the Gloucester and Worcester Brigade Company of the Army Service Corps in the South Midland Division Transport and Supply Column.

== Post 1947 ==
Two units of the post-1947 Territorial Army derived their seniority from the formation of the 1st Gloucestershire EVC in 1861: 108 Field Engineer Regiment at Swansea and 109 Construction Regiment, RE, at Cardiff, both descended in part from the Severn Division Submarine Miners.

== Honorary colonel ==
The following officers served as honorary colonel of the unit:

- Lt-Col Henry Somerset, 8th Duke of Beaufort, of the Gloucestershire Yeomanry, appointed (to 1st Admin Battalion) 20 November 1867, resigned 2 January 1888
- Gen Sir John Lintorn Simmons, GCB, GCMG, appointed 14 July 1888
- Gen Sir Charles Warren, GCMG, KCB, RE, appointed 23 November 1901
