= Lintorn Simmons =

British Field Marshal (1821–1903)

Field Marshal Sir Lintorn Simmons GCB GCMG
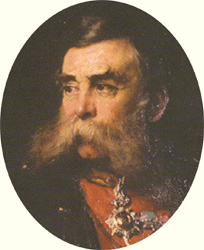
- Born: 12 February 1821; Lower Langford, Somerset
- Died: 14 February 1903 (aged 82); Hawley, Hampshire, England
- Military career
- Allegiance: United Kingdom
- Branch: British Army
- Service years: 1837–1888
- Rank: Field Marshal
- Commands: Royal Engineer Establishment; Royal Military Academy; Royal Engineers
- Conflicts: Crimean War
- Other work: Governor of Malta

Field Marshal Sir John Lintorn Arabin Simmons, GCB, GCMG (12 February 1821 – 14 February 1903) was a British Army officer. Early in his career he served as Inspector of Railways, Secretary of the Railways Commission and then Secretary of the Railway Department under the Board of Trade. He went on to be British Commissioner with the Turkish Army providing advice to General Omar Pasha during the Crimean War. He assisted the Turks at the defence of Silistra and then led them at the Battle of Giurgevo before landing with them at the Battle of Eupatoria and remaining with them for the Siege of Sevastopol. After that he became British Consul in Warsaw, Commander, Royal Engineers at Aldershot and then Director of the Royal Engineer Establishment in Chatham. He went on to be Lieutenant-Governor of the Royal Military Academy and subsequently Governor of the Academy. His last appointments were as Colonel Commandant of the Royal Engineers, as Inspector General of Fortifications and then as Governor of Malta.

== Military career ==
Born the fifth son of Captain Thomas Frederick Simmons, RA and Mary Simmons (née Perry), Simmons was educated at Elizabeth College, Guernsey and the Royal Military Academy, Woolwich. He was commissioned as a second lieutenant in the Royal Engineers on 4 December 1837 and promoted to lieutenant on 15 October 1839. He was then sent to Canada where he carried out survey work on the disputed border with the United States of America.

Returning to the United Kingdom in 1845, Simmons became an instructor at the Royal Military Academy, Woolwich with promotion to second captain on 9 November 1846. He was appointed Inspector of Railways in 1847, Secretary of the Railways Commission in 1850 and Secretary of the Railway Department under the Board of Trade in 1851. He investigated many railway accidents, perhaps the most famous of which was the Dee Bridge disaster in 1847. His report blamed the cast iron girders for the accident, which killed five passengers and crew. The accident was highly significant at the time because it had been designed by Robert Stephenson.

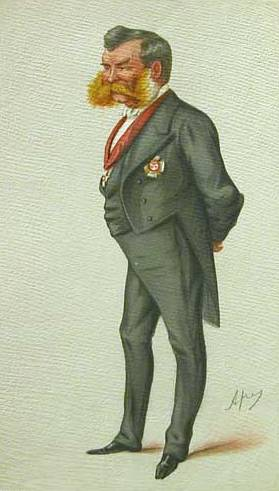
Sir John Lintorn Arabin Simmons by Carlo Pellegrini, 1877

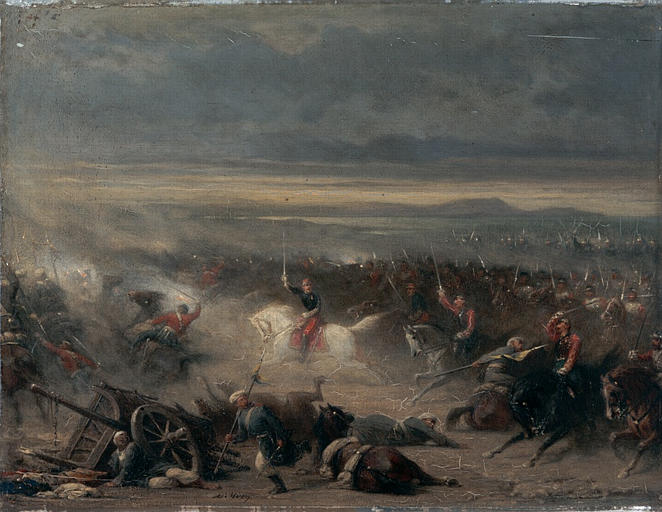
The Battle of Eupatoria, at which Simmonds served with the Turks, during the Crimean War

In 1853, whilst on leave from his role with the Board of Trade, he was in Constantinople when Turkey declared war on Russia. The British Ambassador, Lord Stratford de Redcliffe, took up Simmons' offer of his services, requesting that he report on Turkish defences and their ability to resist a Russian advance. Promoted to captain on 17 February 1854, he became British Commissioner with the Turkish Army providing advice to General Omar Pasha as the Crimean War started. He assisted the Turks at the defence of Silistra in June 1854 and then led them at the Battle of Giurgevo in July 1854; having been promoted to brevet major on 12 July 1854 and to brevet lieutenant colonel on 14 July 1854, he landed with the Turks at the Battle of Eupatoria in February 1855 and remained with them for the Siege of Sevastopol in the Summer of 1855.

Promoted to brevet colonel on 12 December 1857 Simmons became British Consul in Warsaw in February 1858, Commander, Royal Engineers at Aldershot in 1860 and Director of the Royal Engineer Establishment in Chatham in 1865. Promoted to major general on 6 March 1868, he became Lieutenant-Governor of the Royal Military Academy in March 1869 and subsequently Governor of the Academy. He became Colonel Commandant of the Royal Engineers with promotion to lieutenant general on 27 August 1872. He was also appointed a Commissioner to enquire into the Causes of Accidents on Railways in June 1874.

Simmons went on to be Inspector General of Fortifications in 1875, and having been promoted to full general on 1 October 1877, he was invited to join a Royal Commission appointed to inquire into the condition and sufficiency of the means provided for the defence of the more important seaports within the Colonial Possessions. In June 1884 he became Governor of Malta, where he oversaw significant constitutional and social changes on the island. After he retired in September 1888, the Foreign Office continued to utilise his services and in 1889 he went to Rome as Envoy Extraordinary and Minister Plenipotentiary to Pope Leo XIII. He also became honorary colonel of the 1st Gloucestershire (The Western Counties) Engineer Volunteers, Royal Engineers and subsequently of the 1st Devonshire and Somersetshire Royal Engineers and after that of the 1st Middlesex Royal Engineers as well as honorary colonel of the Engineer and Railway Volunteer Staff Corps.

Promoted to field marshal on 21 May 1890, Simmons retired to Hawley House at Hawley in Hampshire where he died on 14 February 1903. He is buried at the Church of St John the Baptist, Churchill in Somerset.

== Family ==
In 1846 Simmons married his cousin, Ellen Lintorn Simmons; they had one daughter, Eleanor. Following the death of his first wife, he married Blanche Weston in 1856. They had one daughter Blanche who married Charles Orman.

== Honours ==
Simmons's honours included:

- Knight Grand Cross of the Order of the Bath (GCB) – 29 July 1878 (KCB – 2 June 1869)
- Knight Grand Cross of St Michael and St George (GCMG) – 24 May 1887
- Legion of Honour, 4th Class (France) – 22 March 1858
- Grand Cordon of the Order of the Medjidie (Ottoman Empire) – 13 March 1890

=== Memorial ===
There is a memorial to him in St Paul's Cathedral.

== See also ==
- Simmonston

== Sources ==
- Heathcote, Tony (1999). The British Field Marshals 1736–1997. Leo Cooper. ISBN 0-85052-696-5.

Military offices
| Preceded by Sir Frederick Chapman | Inspector-General of Fortifications and Director of Work; 1875–1880 | Succeeded by Thomas Gallwey |
Political offices
| Preceded by Sir Arthur Borton | Governor of Malta; 1884–1888 | Succeeded by Sir Henry Torrens |
