= Glamorgan Fortress Royal Engineers =

Severn Division Submarine Miners Glamorgan Fortress Royal Engineers 109 Construction Regiment
- Active: 1888–1961
- Country: United Kingdom
- Branch: Territorial Army
- Role: Submarine miners Fortress engineers Construction engineers
- Garrison/HQ: Cardiff
- Engagements: Western Front (World War I); North African Campaign; Second Battle of El Alamein; Allied invasion of Sicily

The Glamorgan Fortress Royal Engineers was a Welsh Territorial Army (TA) unit of Britain's Royal Engineers, first raised in 1885 as a Volunteer unit of Submarine Miners to defend the Severn Estuary. During World War I, it carried out defence work in England and Gibraltar, and detachments served on the Western Front. In World War II, it served in the North African campaign, including the Second Battle of El Alamein, and the Allied invasion of Sicily. Postwar, the unit continued in the TA until 1961.

== Origin ==
When Lt-Gen Sir Andrew Clarke, Inspector-General of Fortifications 1882–6, did not have enough Regular Royal Engineers (RE) to man the fixed mines being installed to defend British seaports, he utilised the Volunteer Engineers for this task. After successful trials, the system was rolled out to ports around the country. In 1885 the 1st Gloucestershire (The Western Counties) Engineer Volunteers, Royal Engineers formed a company at Cardiff to cover the Severn Estuary. Under the new Volunteer Regulations of 1887, several officers of the unit gained certificates in signalling.

In 1888, the submarine miners were constituted into a separate branch of the RE Volunteers, and the company became the Severn Division Submarine Miners, ranking second in the list of volunteer submarine mining divisions. By 1895, the unit consisted of three companies, based at 10 Charles Street, Cardiff. Pontypridd County School formed a Cadet Corps in 1901, which was affiliated to the Severn Division and disbanded in 1910.

In 1907, the War Office decided to hand all submarine mining duties over to Militia units and the Volunteer submarine miners were converted into electrical engineers to continue manning the electric searchlights of the harbour defences. The Cardiff unit briefly became the Severn Division Electrical Engineers.

== Territorial Force ==
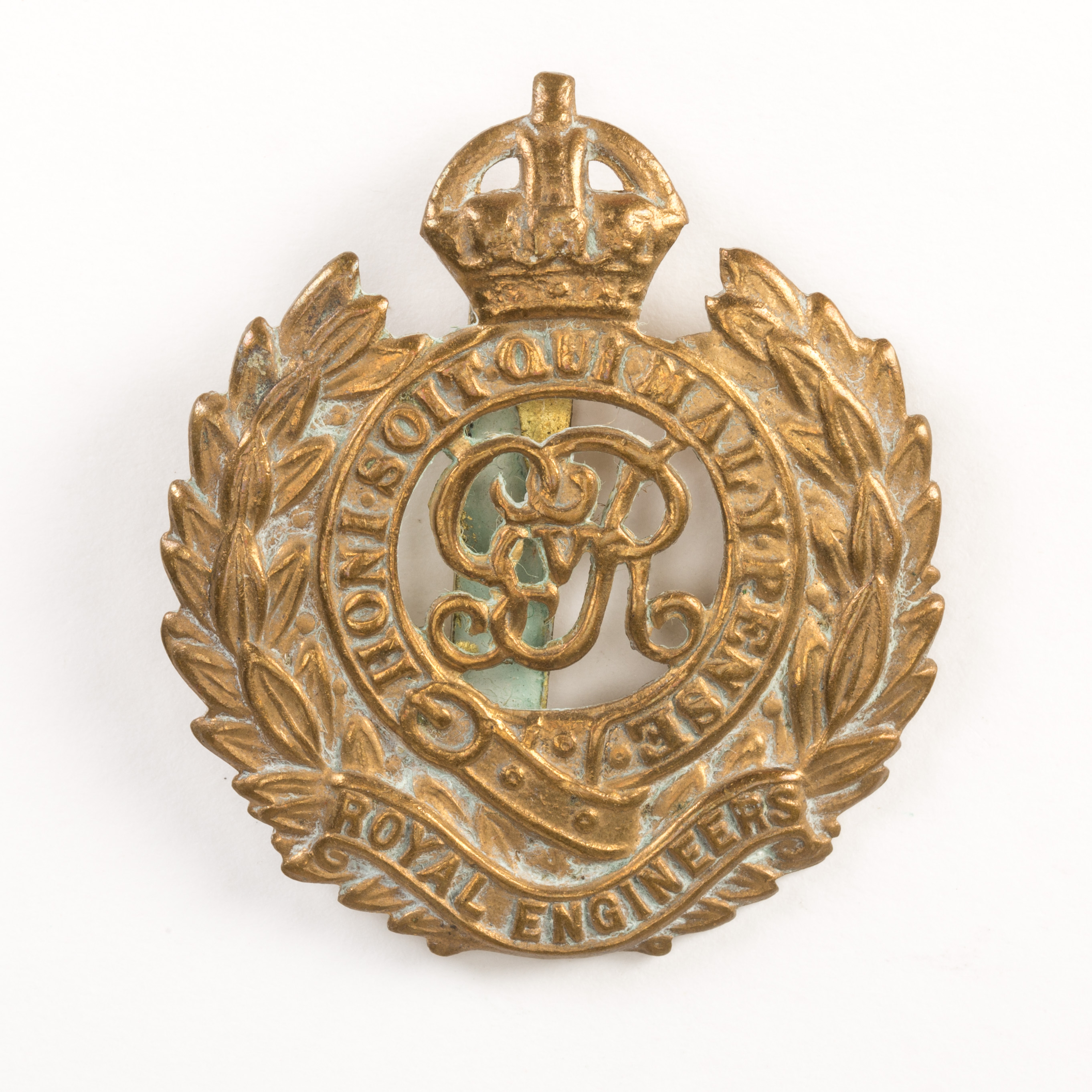
RE Cap badge (King George V cipher)

When the Volunteers were subsumed into the new Territorial Force (TF) in 1908, most of the unit formed the Glamorgan Fortress Royal Engineers, but the early interest of the unit in signalling (see above) led to the simultaneous creation of the Welsh Divisional Telegraph Company, RE, with an initial strength of 44, which was the first TF telegraph unit recognised by War Office in 1908.

Both units had their headquarters (HQs) at The Drill Hall, Park Street, Cardiff. While the telegraph (later signal) company was assigned to the TF's Welsh Division, the fortress engineers formed part of Western Coast Defences, with the following organisation:

- No 1 Works Company at Park Street
- No 2 Works Company at the Drill Hall, Gladstone Road, Barry
- No 3 Electric Lights Company at Park Street (operating coast defence searchlights)

== World War I ==
=== Mobilisation ===
When war was declared on 4 August the Glamorgan Fortress Engineers went to their war stations in the Western Coast Defences. Shortly after the outbreak of war, TF units were invited to volunteer for overseas service and at the end of August the formation of a reserve or 2nd Line unit was authorised for each 1st Line unit where 60 per cent or more of the men had volunteered for Overseas Service. The titles of these 2nd Line units would be the same as the original, but distinguished by a '2/' prefix. In the case of the Glamorgan Fortress Engineers, 3rd Line and additional 1st Line units were also formed.

Once it was clear that the threat to Britain's coastal defences was small, six of the fortress engineer units organised their 1st Line as 'Army Troops' companies for service on the Lines of Communication of the British Expeditionary Force. The Glamorgan Fortress Company embarked for France on 29 December 1914 and arrived at Rouen. The 2nd Works Company embarked for France on 8 March 1915.

=== Service ===
By the end of the war, the Glamorgan Fortress Engineers had formed the following service companies (numbers were assigned to TF companies of the RE in February 1917):

- 1/1st Glamorgan Field Company, assigned to 68th (2nd Welsh) Division 29 November 1915, became 441st (Glamorgan) Field Company
- 2/1st Glamorgan Field Company, assigned to 68th (2nd Welsh) Division by January 1916, became 442nd (Glamorgan) Field Company
- 3/1st Glamorgan Fortress Company, assigned (as 3/1st Glamorgan Field Company) to 72nd Division by 20 November 1916, became 550th (Glamorgan) Field Company; in January 1918, it was converted into 550th (Glamorgan) Army Troops Company and embarked to join the BEF's Second Army from 22 June 1918 to May 1919.
- 1/2nd Glamorgan Field Company, became 557th (Glamorgan) Army Troops Company
- 2/2nd Glamorgan Fortress Company, assigned (as 2/2nd Glamorgan Field Company) to 72nd Division by 20 November 1916, became 551st (Glamorgan) Field Company; in January 1918 converted into 551st (Glamorgan) Army Troops Company
- 556th (Glamorgan) Army Troops Company, with II Corps September 1918, then with Second Army until June 1919
- 1/5th Glamorgan Works Company, sent to Gibraltar in November 1916 and remained there until the end of the war; became 558th (Glamorgan) Works Company

68th (2nd Welsh) Division came into existence in January 1915 as the 2nd Line of the prewar Welsh Division (later 53rd (Welsh) Division). 441st and 442nd (Glamorgan) Field Companies joined it in November 1915 when the division was allotted a position in the Home Defence scheme and it joined First Army in Central Force. At this time the division was concentrated in Bedfordshire. In September 1916 it was moved to General Reserve, Home Forces, with the field companies quartered at Yatesbury and Bungay. In May 1917, 68th Division was transferred to Northern Army (Home Forces) on the coast of Norfolk and Suffolk, and the field companies moved to Great Yarmouth (sometimes at Herringfleet) and Southwold (sometimes at Heydon, Norfolk); they remained in these positions until the end of the war. The division slowly lost its Welsh connections and became a training formation. After the Armistice with Germany, the division began to disband: by 6 January 1919 half the engineers had already been demobilised.

72nd Division was an additional Home Service formation created in November 1916, when 550th and 551st fortress companies joined as field companies. The division assembled in Somerset and in January 1917 it moved to Bedfordshire then in May to Ipswich in Suffolk, with 550th and 551st Fd Cos at Yatesbury. The division was part of Southern Army (Home Forces), responsible for defence of the East Coast. At the end of 1917, orders were received to break up the division. This process was completed on 8 April, when 550th Fd Co prepared to join the BEF and 551st Fd Co was broken up.

=== Anti-Aircraft defence ===
In addition to operating searchlights for the coastal defence guns, the RE fortress companies began to utilise them in the Anti-Aircraft (AA) role. As the war progressed, and raids by airships and fixed wing bombers became more frequent, the RE formed specialist AA Searchlight Companies. 1/3rd and 2/3rd Electric Light Companies of the Glamorgan Fortress Engineers are known to have operated in this manner in Home Defence. In January 1918, the AA defences were reorganised and RE searchlight personnel were attached to AA gun companies of the Royal Garrison Artillery.

== Interwar ==
The TF was reconstituted as the Territorial Army (TA) in 1920–1 and the Glamorgan Fortress Engineers was reformed as an HQ and single No 1 (Electric Light & Works) Company at Barry as coast defence troops under 53rd (Welsh) Divisional area.

== World War II ==
=== Mobilisation ===
On the outbreak of war, the Glamorgan Fortress Engineers mobilised in Cardiff Coast Defences. However, by September 1940, it had been converted into 588 Army Troops Company and was under training as part of the War Office Reserve, earmarked for overseas service. By the end of the year, it was serving in Western Command, then joined the General Headquarters Reserve in February 1941 before returning to the WO Reserve and sailing for Egypt in March.

=== Alamein ===
On arrival, 588 Company worked in the Canal Zone under British Troops in Egypt. By early August 1942, when Eighth Army had retreated to the El Alamein position, the company was at the army's supply base at Burg el Arab, directly under Eighth Army HQ. During the subsequent Second Battle of El Alamein, the company was again under direct control of Army HQ.

588 Army Troops Company accompanied Eighth Army to Sicily and probably continued into Italy.

== Postwar ==
When the TA was reconstituted in 1947, the unit reformed at Cardiff as 109 Construction Regiment, RE, with the following organisation:

- 246 Plant Squadron
- 247 Construction Squadron
- 283 Construction Squadron
- 284 Construction Squadron
- 588 Electrical & Mechanical Squadron at Barry – disbanded before 1961

The regiment formed part of 23 Engineer Group in Western Command. It derived its seniority from the former 1st Gloucester Engineer Volunteers formed in 1861.

When the TA was reduced in 1961, the regiment (apart from 247 Sqn) was absorbed by 108 Engineer Rgt, which was redesignated 53rd Divisional/District Engineers. 247 Squadron transferred to the Royal Monmouthshire Royal Engineers (Militia) as 247 (Glamorgan) Corps Field Park Sqn; this squadron disappeared in a further reorganisation in 1967.

== Honorary Commandant ==
Maj-Gen Henry H. Lee, RE, was appointed Hon Lieutenant-Colonel Commandant of the Severn Submarine Miners on 4 April 1888.

== Memorial ==
There is a memorial plaque in Llandaff Cathedral, Cardiff, to the Glamorgan Royal Engineers who died in World War I.
