= VIII Corps Troops, Royal Engineers =

VIII Corps Troops, Royal Engineers 29th Army Troops, Royal Engineers
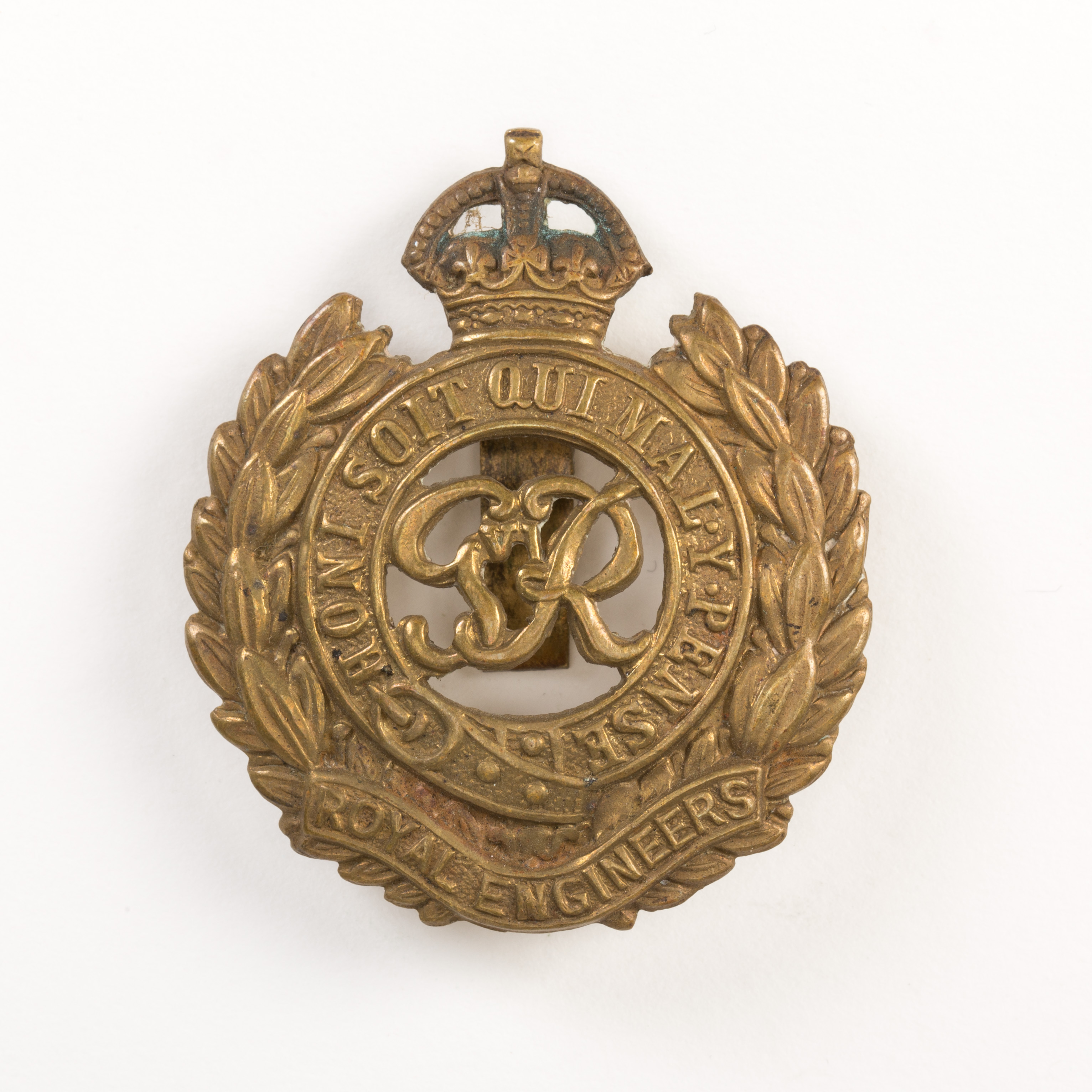
- Royal Engineers' Cap badge
- Active: 1940–1948
- Country: United Kingdom
- Branch: British Army
- Role: Corps/Army engineers
- Size: 4–7 Companies
- Part of: VIII Corps; British Army of the Rhine
- Engagements: Operation Epsom; Operation Goodwood; Operation Bluecoat; Operation Constellation; Operation Plunder; Operation Enterprise

VIII Corps Troops, Royal Engineers (VIII CTRE) was a battalion-sized unit of Royal Engineers (RE) attached to the British Army's VIII Corps Headquarters in World War II. It served with 21st Army Group during the campaign in North West Europe 1944–45. It built the first British bridges across the Rhine and the Elbe after the assault crossings in March and April 1945 and continued in British Army of the Rhine after the end of the war.

== Organisation ==
When VIII Corps Headquarters (HQ) was re-established (Note: A previous VIII Corps HQ was formed in the Gallipoli Campaign in May 1915 and a Commander Engineers (CE) was appointed. It was broken up in January 1916 and reformed on the Western Front in March that year. VIII Corps was broken up again in June 1918 and XVIII Corps was redesignated as VIII Corps. In September 1918 VIII Corps RE comprised 282nd, 290th (Staffordshire) and 560th Army Troops Companies, 1st Siege Company, Royal Monmouthshire Royal Engineers, and 185th Tunnelling Company. VIII Corps CE's HQ was closed down in January 1919.) in Southern Command in June 1940, its Corps Troops Royal Engineers (CTRE) were provided by companies drawn from the Devon & Cornwall Fortress Engineers:

- 570 Corps Field Park Company
- 571 Army Field Company
- 572 Army Field Company
- 573 Army Field Company

VIII Corps' formation sign.

By January 1941 several other companies were attached to VIII CTRE:

- 264 Field Company – joined from XII CTRE; part of the War Office Reserve
- 508 Field Park Company – joined from London defences
- 579 Army Field Company – joined from Hampshire CTRE

However, in February 1941, the Devon & Cornwall companies left VIII Corps and were sent to Egypt, where they became X CTRE in Eighth Army. Over the next two years VIII CTRE reorganised as follows:

- 100 (Monmouthshire) Field Company – joined from 77th Division ca January 1943
- 101 (Monmouthshire) Field Company – joined from 77th Division ca January 1943
- 224 (South Midland) Field Company – joined from 48th (South Midland) Division March 1943
- 264 Field Company – transferred to 2nd GHQTRE July 1942
- 508 Field Park Company – left September 1942; returned February 1943; included a Light Aid Detachment of the Royal Electrical and Mechanical Engineers
- 579 Field Company – transferred to 1st Army TRE July 1942
- 752 Army Field Company – joined ca February 1941; left 13 December 1941

In February 1943 VIII Corps moved from Southern Command to Northern Command, and by July that year it formed part of Second Army in 21st Army Group, training for the planned Allied invasion of Normandy (Operation Overlord) in 1944.

== Normandy ==
VIII Corps was a follow-up formation after D Day, completing its concentration in Normandy on 26 June 1944. It then mounted a three-division attack west of Caen (Operation Epsom) to seize a bridgehead over the River Odon. The divisional and corps engineers were employed largely on clearing minefields and rubble-blocked village roads. 15th (Scottish) Division succeeded in advancing a few thousand yards, and then defended the resulting salient ('Scottish Corridor') against counter-attacks. After the battle ended on 1 July the sappers were involved in burying dead cattle strewn across the fields that constituted a health hazard. VIII Corps HQ was then shifted east of Caen to undertake an armoured assault (Operation Goodwood). All available engineers were employed in clearing passages through minefields and developing routes so that the armour could move up and deploy. The attack was launched on 18 July and advanced some 7 miles (11 km), but was halted by resolute German defence.

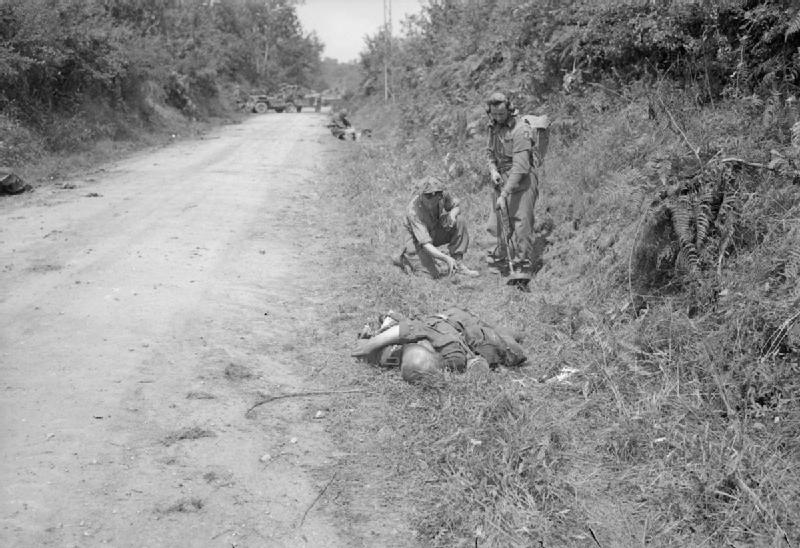
Troops use mine detectors during the breakout to Caumont in late July 1944.

In late July VIII Corps HQ was again sent west of Caen to command part of the southward thrust from Caumont through Bocage country during the breakout from the Normandy bridgehead (Operation Bluecoat). The main initial problem was German (and US) minefields. As 21st Army Group advanced rapidly over Northern France after the breakout, a large number of bridges were hastily erected. Operating on the right flank of XXX Corps' thrust towards Arnhem in Operation Market Garden, VIII Corps had to cross innumerable canals and rivers, which meant a heavy workload for all the engineer units. Later the bridges on the major lines of communication had to be replaced or strengthened, and new ones built. VIII Corps TRE built a noteworthy Class 70 bridge (the heaviest class of Bailey bridge) over the Seine at Mantes-Gassicourt.

== Low Countries ==
After the failure of Market Garden, VIII Corps was given the task of clearing German forces from the west bank of the River Maas (Operation Constellation). This operation proceeded through November, with numerous waterways to cross, and the sappers laying miles of Sommerfeld Tracking and brushwood across the Peel marshes to enable vehicles to move forward. VIII Corps broke through the German second defence line covering Venlo on 22 November and on 3 December 15th (Scottish) Division captured Blerick, the last German bridgehead on the Maas.

== Rhine crossing ==
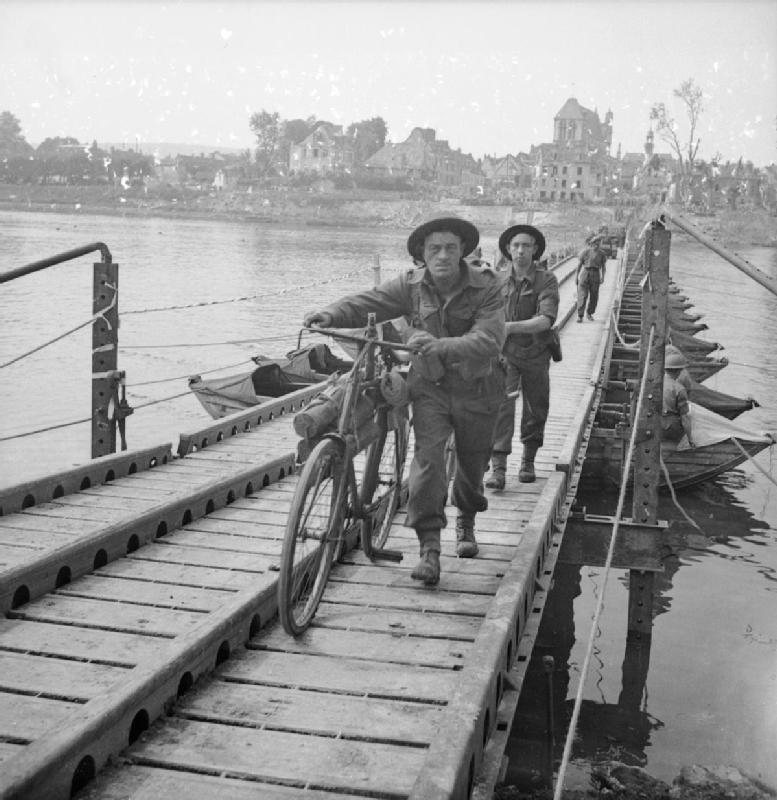
A class 9 FBE bridge.

VIII Corps was not directly involved in the operations to clear the Reichswald (Operation Veritable) in early 1945, nor was it scheduled to take part in the assault crossing of the Rhine (Operation Plunder), but the most direct route to the assault position crossed the Maas in VIII Corps' sector, so it was given responsibility for developing the necessary roads in the weeks beforehand. The corps was assigned a large number of RE units for these tasks, of which its own VIII CTRE was given the job of building a 400 feet (120 m) Class 9 Folding Boat Equipment (FBE) bridge at Venlo.

For the Rhine crossing, VIII CTRE (except 508 Field Park Co) was assigned to XII Corps. Under the command of Lieutenant-Colonel J.E. Marsh, the three field companies of VIII CTRE (100, 101, 224) had the job of building a Class 9 FBE bridge codenamed 'Twist' (Note: The three brigade sub-operations in Torchlight were named after card games: 'Poker', 'Whist' and 'Nap'; 'Twist' (from Pontoon) completed the sequence.) opposite Wolfskath. The assault crossing on XII Corps' front (Operation Torchlight) by 15th (Scottish) Division began at 02.00 on 24 March, and by 09.00 10th Battalion Highland Light Infantry had cleared Wolfskath after bitter fighting. Lieutenant-Col Marsh called forward his first bridging vehicles at 06.00, but because of enemy fire they did not begin to arrive on site until 13.00. 'Twist' with its 1,000 yards (910 m) of approaches was opened for traffic 10 hours later – the first British-built bridge across the river. During the night of 24/25 March a traffic jam built up and broke the bridge, 22 bays being half-sunk and displaced downstream; however, it was repaired and reopened 13 hours later.

== Germany ==
As VIII Corps advanced into Germany, VIII CTRE built three Class 40 Bailey bridges over the River Lippe to enable the troops of Ninth US Army to debouch from Wesel, and by 30 March VIII CTRE and 16th Airfield Construction Group RE had provided three more bridges on the main axes of advance. By 5 April the corps had advanced 150 miles (240 km) from the Rhine and 6th Airborne Division had secured two small bridgeheads over the River Weser. The divisional RE built a 200 feet (61 m) Class 9 FBE bridge during the morning of 6 April, and a company of VIII CTRE, assisted in the later stages by 3rd Parachute Squadron, RE, completed a 320 feet (98 m) Class 40 Bailey pontoon bridge shortly after midnight on 6/7 April. These bridges were of vital importance, because 11th Armoured Division's bridging efforts further north were abandoned after accurate bombing raids and shellfire. Eventually 15th (Scottish) Division's RE widened the bridgehead to the south by building another bridge with the help of VIII CTRE.

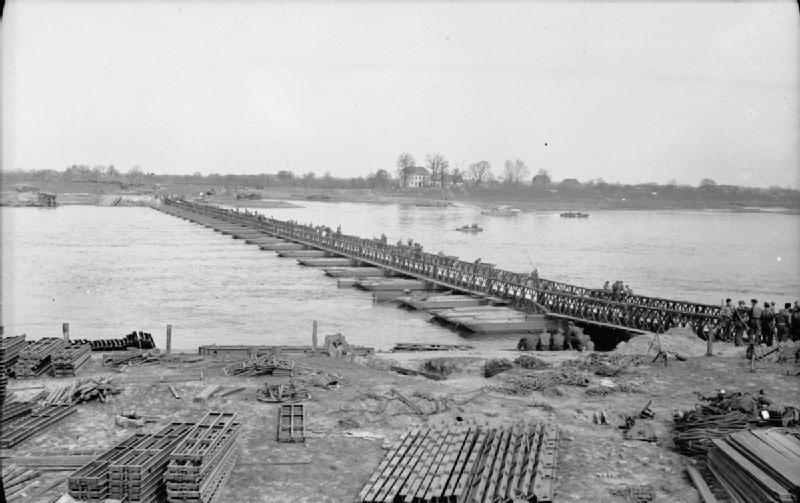
A Class 40 pontoon Bailey bridge.

On 21 April the leading troops of VIII Corps reached the River Elbe: during the advance from the Weser the RE under this corps had to build over 30 major bridges and strengthen another dozen, while the dumps of bridging supplies were still 200 miles (320 km) back on the other side of the Rhine. Crossing the Elbe, however, was a bigger proposition, requiring planning and the collection of engineering stores. Field Marshal Bernard Montgomery decided that VIII Corps would again provide the crossing for XII Corps, with 15th (Scottish) Division making the assault crossing (Operation Enterprise). VIII CTRE would support the operation by building a Class 9 FBE bridge across to Lauenburg, as well as maintaining a DUKW ferry and providing booms to protect the bridges. H Hour for the assault was 02.00 on 29 April, but there was considerable congestion in the streets of Artlenburg, and it was not until 08.30–10.00 that the RE parties were able to begin work. From 11.00 enemy shelling of the bridging sites became accurate and intense, and there were frequent attacks by enemy aircraft. VIII CTRE suffered badly during one attack by low-flying jet aircraft at 13.15, losing eight killed and 22 wounded. Bomb craters in the bridge approaches caused further delay, but the FBE bridge was opened at 20.15, only a quarter of an hour later than scheduled. The following day the Luftwaffe continued its attempts to destroy the bridges, but RAF jet fighters were now providing air cover. The Germans also sent frogmen in an unsuccessful attempt to sabotage the bridges, one of whom was captured by VIII CTRE.

XII Corps passed through the bridgehead provided by VIII Corps and continued the advance against collapsing opposition, but on 4 May came the German surrender at Lüneburg Heath. This did not end the work for the sappers: for many months they were engaged in repair and restoration of essential services behind the armies and in the occupied zone of Germany.

== Postwar ==
In August 1946, VIII CTRE was merged with 43rd (Wessex) Divisional Engineers to form 29th Army Troops Royal Engineers (ATRE) in British Army of the Rhine, with the following organisation:

- 562 Field Company – from 100 (Monmouth) Field Company
- 563 Field Park Company – from 207 (Wessex) Field Park Company
- 564 Field Company – from 101 (Monmouth) Field Company
- 565 Field Company – from 204 (Wessex) Field Company

(The numbers 562–565 were taken from recently disbanded units)

29th ATRE returned to the UK in 1948 and on 1 April was converted into 35 Army Engineer Regiment for service with Middle East Land Forces.
