= 1st Devonshire Engineers =

1st Devonshire Engineer Volunteers Devonshire Fortress Royal Engineers 116 (Devon & Cornwall) Engineer Regiment
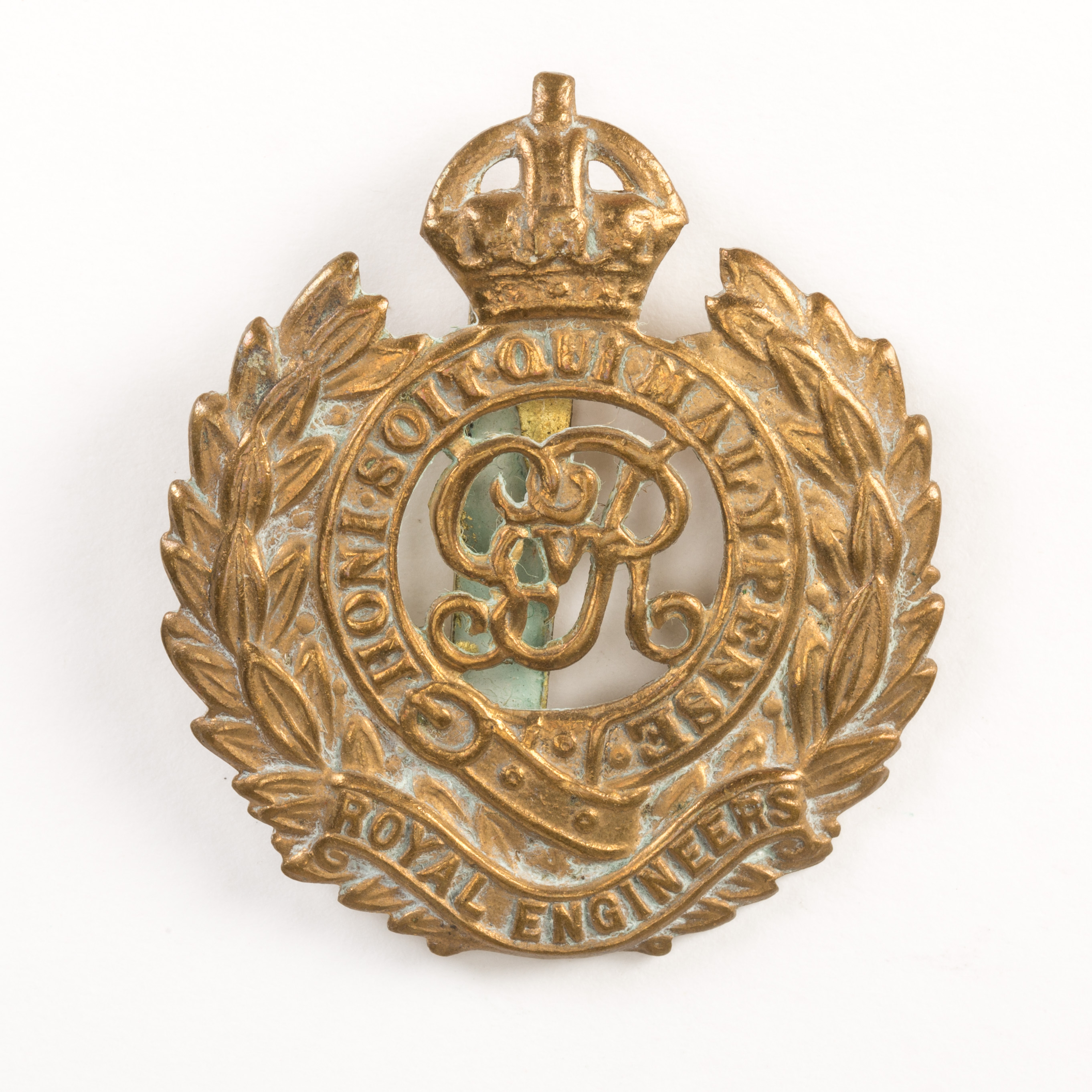
- RE Cap badge (King George V cipher)
- Active: 1862–1950; 1961–1969
- Country: United Kingdom
- Branch: Territorial Army
- Role: Coast Defence; Field Engineering
- Garrison/HQ: Torquay; Exeter; Plymouth
- Engagements: Second Boer War; First World War: Sinai and Palestine Campaign; Second World War: North African Campaign; Second Battle of El Alamein; Italian Campaign; North West Europe Campaign

The 1st Devonshire Engineer Volunteer Corps, later the Devonshire Fortress Royal Engineers, was a volunteer unit of Britain's Royal Engineers whose history dated back to 1862. The unit helped to defend the vital naval base of Plymouth, and supplied detachments for service in the field in both World Wars. During the North African campaign in the Second World War, the unit's sappers distinguished themselves in bridging the Nile and clearing minefields during and after the Second Battle of El Alamein. Their successors served on the postwar Territorial Army until 1969.

== Origins ==
The enthusiasm for the Volunteer movement following an invasion scare in 1859 led to the creation of many Rifle, Artillery and Engineer Volunteer units composed of part-time soldiers eager to supplement the Regular British Army in time of need. One such unit was the 1st Devonshire Engineer Volunteer Corps (EVC) formed at Torquay, with the first officers' commissions dated 28 January 1862.

The 1st Devonshire EVC was attached for administrative purposes to the 1st (Exeter and South Devon) Devonshire Rifle Volunteer Corps from April 1863 until August 1869, when it joined the 1st Administrative Battalion, Gloucestershire Engineer Volunteers. With the reorganisation of the Volunteer Force in 1880, the Gloucestershire Admin Bn was consolidated as the 1st Gloucestershire (Gloucester, Somerset and Devon) Engineer Volunteer Corps, with the 1st Devon providing E Company at Torquay and F Company at Exeter. The unit became the 1st Gloucestershire (The Western Counties) Engineer Volunteers, Royal Engineers, after the Somerset unit left in 1888. The EVC titles were abandoned in 1888, when the units became 'Engineer Volunteers, Royal Engineers', proclaiming their affiliation to the Regular RE, and then simply 'Royal Engineers (Volunteers)' in 1896.

In August 1889, the Devon and Somerset companies were removed from the Gloucestershire battalion and constituted as a separate 1st Devonshire and Somersetshire RE (V), with its HQ at the Priory, Colleton Crescent, Exeter.

The 1st Devonshire and Somerset RE (V) sent a detachment of one officer and 25 other ranks to assist the regular REs during the Second Boer War in 1900, and a second section the following year.

== Territorial Force ==
When the Volunteers were subsumed into the new Territorial Force (TF) in 1908, the Devon and Somerset Engineers were split to form the Devonshire Fortress Royal Engineers at Plymouth and the divisional engineer companies for the Wessex Division, which were based in Somerset (except for part of the signal company, which remained at Exeter).

The Devonshire Fortress Engineers was organised as follows:

- HQ at Mutley Barracks, Plymouth
- No 1 Works Company at the Drill Hall, Rock Road, Torquay
- Nos 2 & 3 Works Companies at Exeter
- Nos 4 & 5 Electric Lights Companies at Plymouth

A new Drill Hall at Lambhay Green, Plymouth, designed in 1913, was completed in 1918.

== First World War ==
=== Mobilisation ===
On the outbreak of war in August 1914, the fortress engineers moved to their war stations in the coastal defences, the Devonshire Fortress Engineers coming under the command of South Western Coast Defences HQ at Devonport, Plymouth. Shortly afterwards, the men of the TF were invited to volunteer for Overseas Service and WO instructions were issued to form those men who had only signed up for Home Service into reserve or 2nd Line units. The titles of these 2nd Line units were the same as the original, but distinguished by a '2/' prefix. They absorbed most of the recruits that flooded in, and in many cases themselves went on active service later.

In December 1914 the 1/1st Devonshire (Works) Co sailed to Gibraltar to relieve a Regular RE company there. In the Spring of 1915 it was relieved by 1/2nd Devonshire (Works) Co. The 1/1st Devonshire then moved to the Western Front and joined the British Expeditionary Force (BEF). It served on the Somme in 1916. The 1/2nd Devonshire was in turn relieved by another TF company in November 1916 and embarked again for service with the BEF on 17 March 1917. The 1/4th Dorset (EL) Company was also sent to Gibraltar in April 1915 to replace a Regular company.

When the TF companies of the RE received numbers in February 1917, they were assigned as follows:

- 567th (Devon) Army Troops Company – formerly 1/1st Devon (Works) Company
- 568th (Devon) Army Troops Company – formerly 1/2nd Devon (Works) Company
- 569th (Devon) Army Troops Company – formerly 1/3rd Devon (Works) Company
- 570th (Devon) Army Troops Company – formerly 2/1st Devon (Works) Company
- 571st (Devon) Works Company – probably 2/2nd Devon (Works) Company
- 572nd (Devon) Works Company – formerly 2/3rd Devon (Works) Company
- 614th (Devon) Fortress Company – formerly 1/4th Devon (Electric Lights) Company

=== Sinai and Palestine ===
Details of the service of the Devon companies are sketchy. At the end of August 1917, 571st Company officially changed its designation from 'Works' to 'Army Troops' and most of the company embarked at Southampton on 29 September (the wagons and horses followed a month later). 570th and 571st Companies disembarked at Alexandria in October, where 569th Company was already engaged on various duties around the ports and camps. At this stage of the Sinai and Palestine Campaign, the Egyptian Expeditionary Force (EEF) was about to launch the Battle of Beersheba and begin its advance to capture Jerusalem. The three companies served on the vital lines of communications in Egypt and Palestine supporting the EEF for the rest of the war.

=== Later war ===
567th (Devon) Company was serving with X Corps in June 1917. 567th and 568th (Devon) Companies joined III Corps of Fifth Army in February 1918 when it took over part of the line from the French Army. However, their work was overtaken by the German spring offensive in March that year, when III Corps was forced to abandon all its defences and retire behind the Crozat Canal on the first day. 567th (Devon) Company was with Fourth Army, by the time of the Armistice in November 1918. 568th (Devon) Company was still serving with First Army as late as June 1919.

569th, 570th and 571st (Devon) Companies continued working on the Palestine Lines of Communications after the Armistice, 570th Company serving until at least March 1920. Having spent much of the war working in the UK, 572nd (Devon) Works Company finally embarked to join the BEF on 8 August 1918 to work on aerodrome construction for the Royal Air Force, and remained overseas until at least March 1919. 614th continued doing fortress duties in Gibraltar until it was absorbed into the Regular 33rd Fortress Company RE in 1919.

== Interwar ==
The Devonshire Fortress Engineers was reformed at Muttley Barracks, Plymouth, in the renamed Territorial Army (TA) in 1920, forming part of the Coast Defence forces in 43rd (Wessex) Divisional Area. In 1933 it was amalgamated with the Cornwall Fortress Engineers at Falmouth and became the Devonshire and Cornwall (Fortress) Engineers (D&C (F) RE) with the following organisation:

- No 1 (EL & Works) Company
- No 2 (EL) Company
- No 3 (EL) Company
- No 4 (Anti-Aircraft Searchlight) Company at Falmouth – 'from Cornwall Fortress Engineers'

The Plymouth Junior Technical School Cadet Corps was attached to the unit.

== Second World War ==
=== Mobilisation ===
Just before or shortly after war broke out in September 1939 a fifth EL&W company was added to the unit, based at Pendennis Castle under Commander, Fixed Defences, Falmouth, and No 4 Company became an independent unit (482nd (Devon & Cornwall) Searchlight Company) under the command of 55th Anti-Aircraft Brigade. The remainder of the D&C (F) RE mobilised in the Plymouth and Falmouth Defences of Southern Command. In May 1940 the fortress companies were reorganised as field companies; No 5 E&L Company left for Tiverton on 23 May 1940, having been redesignated 573rd Devon and Cornwall Army Field Company.

When VIII Corps was formed in Southern Command in June 1940, its engineers (VIII Corps Troops, Royal Engineers, or VIII CTRE) were provided by the Devonshire and Cornwall Fortress Engineers:

- 570th Corps Field Park Company
- 571st Army Field Company
- 572nd Army Field Company
- 573rd Army Field Company

However, in February 1941, the companies left VIII Corps and were sent to Egypt, where they became X CTRE when X Corps HQ arrived from England a few months later to join Eighth Army.

=== Bridging the Nile ===
On 20 July 1942, when Rommel was driving towards Egypt, General Headquarters (GHQ) ordered the construction of two bridges across the Nile to allow Eighth Army's armour to manoeuvre to the south if the Cairo defences were attacked. The task was assigned to X CTRE under Lt-Col E.N. Bickford. The sites chosen were at Helwan and Wasta, where the widths to be bridged were 2,688 and 2,760 feet (819 and 841 m) respectively, and the difference between high and low water was about 22 feet (6.7 m). Pontoons were unavailable, so local feluccas were used to make a bridge of boats. 572nd Field Company took on the bridge at Helwan with the assistance of a Seychelles Pioneer Company, while 571st Field Company with a Mauritius Pioneer Company built the Wasta bridge. 570th Field Park Company was responsible for stores and welding. In the event, Rommel's final drive was halted at the Battle of Alam Halfa, the Cairo defences were not required, and the bridges were dismantled in November.

=== Clearing minefields ===
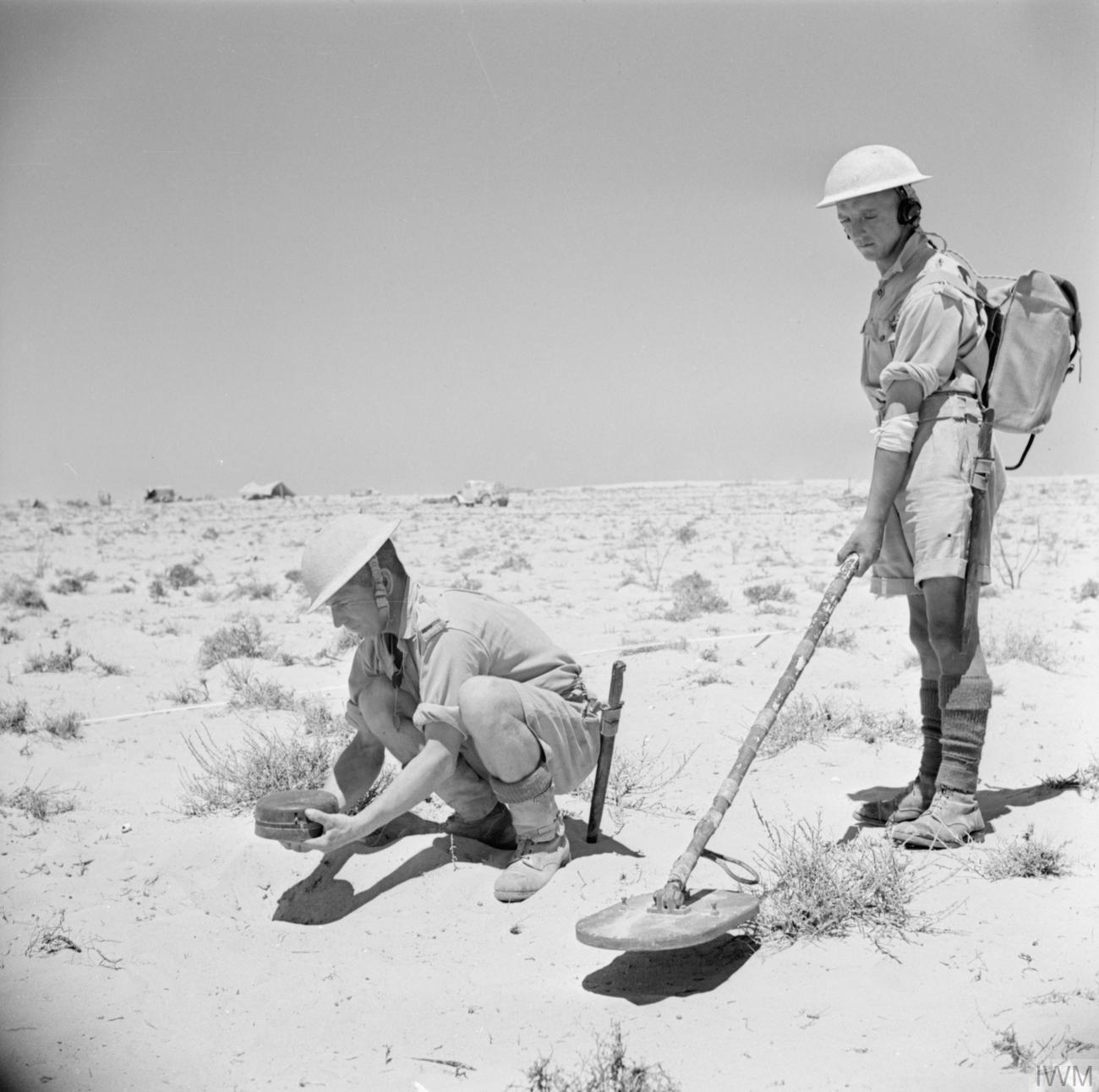
Sappers demonstrating the new Mark I mine detector in North Africa, August 1942.

On 23 October, the Eighth Army under Lieutenant-General Bernard Montgomery counter-attacked at the Second Battle of El Alamein. For the first phase, the aptly-named Operation Lightfoot, the key was to breach the extensive German minefields during the night to allow the armour formations to pass through and exploit the success of the initial bombardment and infantry assault. For this work the sappers were trained to use the recently arrived Polish mine detector (Mine detector Mark I). X Corps organised a Minefield Task Force for each of its armoured divisions: 571st Field Company was attached to 10th Armoured Division, and both 572nd and 573rd Fd Cos were with 1st Armoured Division, while 570th Fd Park Co remained with X Corps HQ.

The task of clearing lanes through the minefields went according to plan, though delayed by the scale of the minefields and the presence of pockets of enemy resistance that had not been cleared out by the attacking infantry. The southern corridor was under enemy artillery and small-arms fire, and when a truck was set on fire the illumination meant that the sappers were exposed to even more accurate fire. However, the gap was cleared by 06.30 on 24 October, and 10th Armoured passed through. Progress was slower in the northern corridor and 51st (Highland) Division had to put in a fresh attack with massed artillery support at 15.00, after which the sappers were able to clear the way for 1st Armoured to deploy during the second night. The regimental history attributes the relatively light casualties among the mine clearance parties, despite the firefights going on around them, 'to the excellence of the mine-lifting drill and the accuracy with which it was carried out'. By 4 November the German and Italian troops were in full retreat across the desert.

=== Advance to Tripoli ===
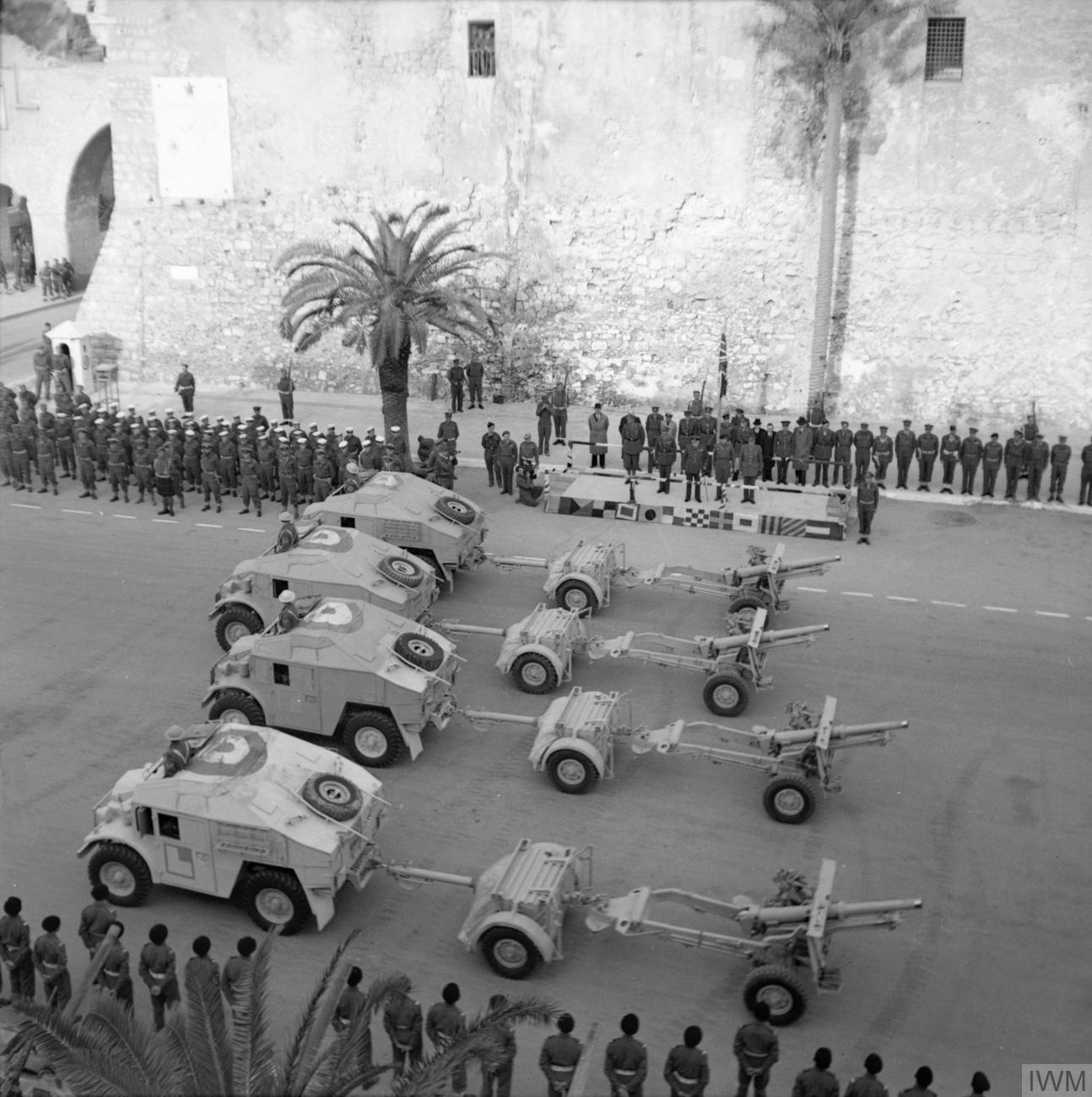
Churchill on the podium takes the salute at the Tripoli victory parade, 4 February 1943.

X CTRE followed Eighth Army's six-month advance across North Africa, repairing roads behind the advancing troops. Between Bouerat and Misourata, the unit dealt with 68 separate demolitions and craters, one involving the construction of a bridge with five 30-foot (9.1 m) spans. So many casualties were suffered from S-mines hidden among the demolitions that bulldozers were frequently called in. Captain Desmond Fitzgerald, a Regular RE officer attached to the TA Devonians of 571st Fd Co for two months from 1 January, recalled that his duties mainly involved clearing mines and booby-traps from captured landing strips before they could be used by the Royal Air Force. The company was attached to 1st Armoured Division at this time.

When the damaged port of Tripoli was captured in late January 1943, Montgomery said that his "main preoccupation was to get the harbour uncorked and ships inside, so as to get a good daily tonnage landed" and reduce reliance on the long coast road from Tobruk. 571st Army Fd Co was one of the units sent to clear debris and repair the approach roads to the quays, and then begin repairing the Spanish Mole. Despite winter storms, a shallow entrance into the harbour was ready for small craft to enter and unload by 30 January. The next task was to remove Fascist Party emblems and pictures of Benito Mussolini, and erect a special podium in the town square for a victory parade attended by Winston Churchill on 4 February. Fitzgerald recalls that the troops referred to this construction as the "oxometer" – a device for measuring bullshit.

=== Italy and North West Europe ===
X CTRE next took part in the Italian campaign of 1943–5, including the crossing of the Garigliano in January 1944. The four Devon companies left X CTRE in early 1945 when they were sent to join 21st Army Group fighting in North West Europe. Here they were redesignated 19th GHQ TRE. The units were demobilised some time after September 1945.

== Postwar ==
When the TA was reconstituted in 1947, the four Devon companies (now termed squadrons, but unusually still retaining the numbers they had borne on and off since 1917) were reformed, comprising 116 Army Engineer Regiment:

- 570 Field Park Squadron
- 571 Field Squadron
- 572 Field Squadron
- 573 Field Squadron

The regiment had its HQ at Plymouth and derived its seniority from the 1st Devonshire EVC of 1862. It formed part of 26 Engineer Group.

116 Regiment was disbanded in 1950 and its number transferred from the TA to the Supplementary Reserve (later the Army Emergency Reserve). A new 116 (Devon and Cornwall) Engineer Regiment was formed in the TA in 1961, comprising a reformed 571 Field Squadron with 409 (Cornwall) Independent Field Squadron, the latter formed in 1956 by conversion of the 409th (Cornwall) Coast Regiment, Royal Artillery. When the TA was converted into the TAVR in 1967, 571 Sqn was reconstituted as B (Devon Fortress Engineers) Squadron in the Devonshire Territorials (Royal Devon Yeomanry/1st Rifle Volunteers). However, the squadron was short-lived, because the TAVR units were reduced to cadre in 1969 and the Devon Fortress Engineers lineage was discontinued.

== Honorary Colonels ==
The following officers served as Honorary Colonel of the unit:

- Field Marshal Sir Lintorn Simmons, RE, appointed 14 July 1888
- General Sir Richard Harrison, RE, appointed 20 January 1909

== Memorial ==
There is a memorial plaque in Exeter Guildhall to the men of 570, 571, 572 and 573 Field Companies, 'formerly Devon and Cornwall Fortress Engineers', who died at home, and in North Africa and Italy during the Second World War.
