= 43rd (Wessex) Reconnaissance Regiment =

48th Reconnaissance Battalion 43rd Reconnaissance Battalion 43rd (Wessex) Reconnaissance Regiment
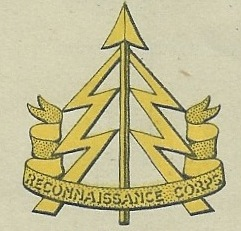
- Cap badge of the Reconnaissance Corps (Note: The Gloucester Regiment historian illustrates 43 Recce as wearing the Recce Corps cap badge on the black beret of the Royal Armoured Corps.)
- Active: 1941–1946
- Country: United Kingdom
- Branch: British Army
- Type: Reconnaissance
- Size: Regiment
- Part of: Reconnaissance Corps

Commanders
- Notable commanders: Sir Dudley Ward; Francis Lane Fox

The 43rd (Wessex) Reconnaissance Regiment (The Gloucestershire Regiment) (43 Recce) was a regiment of the British Army's Reconnaissance Corps, itself part of the Royal Armoured Corps, during World War II. It fought in North West Europe with the 21st Army Group in 1944–1945. Throughout most of its existence the regiment was part of the 43rd (Wessex) Infantry Division.

== Origins ==
The regiment was formed (as 48th Reconnaissance Battalion) on 14 October 1941 by the redesignation of the 5th Battalion, Gloucestershire Regiment, a Territorial Army (TA) infantry battalion that had fought with 48th (South Midland) Infantry Division in Battle of France and Dunkirk evacuation and then acted as the divisional recce battalion since July 1941. The regiment was initially commanded by Lieutenant Colonel Alfred Dudley Ward, later to serve with distinction in the war and destined to become a full General. The following month it was transferred to the 43rd (Wessex) Infantry Division and renumbered accordingly in January 1942. On 6 June 1942 all reconnaissance battalions were redesignated regiments, and on 1 January 1944 the Reconnaissance Corps became part of the Royal Armoured Corps. Lieutenant Colonel Francis ('Joe') Lane Fox, of the Royal Horse Guards, took command of 43 Recce on 29 September 1943.

The first casualty of WWII suffered by the 43rd Wessex Reconnaissance was Leslie George Allen on 19 June 1942 (now interred at Greenbank Cemetery, Bristol) who suffered a gunshot wound to the back of his head whilst out on patrol on a small boat off the coast of Dover.

== Organisation and equipment ==
43rd (Wessex) Division insignia, World War II.

By the time of D-Day in June 1944, all reconnaissance or "recce" regiments were organised into a headquarters squadron and three reconnaissance squadrons. HQ Squadron included a troop of eight 6-pounder anti-tank guns and a troop of six 3-inch mortars, whilst the 43rd recce regiment had the 11th Parachute Battalion as an attachment during the Battle of Arnhem. The recce squadrons each had three scout troops equipped with Humber Armoured Cars, Humber Light Reconnaissance Cars and Bren carriers, and an assault troop of riflemen in M3 Half-tracks. The total establishment was 41 officers and 755 other ranks. In the months before the Normandy landings the regiment was based at Eastbourne on the South Coast of England and trained in the area.

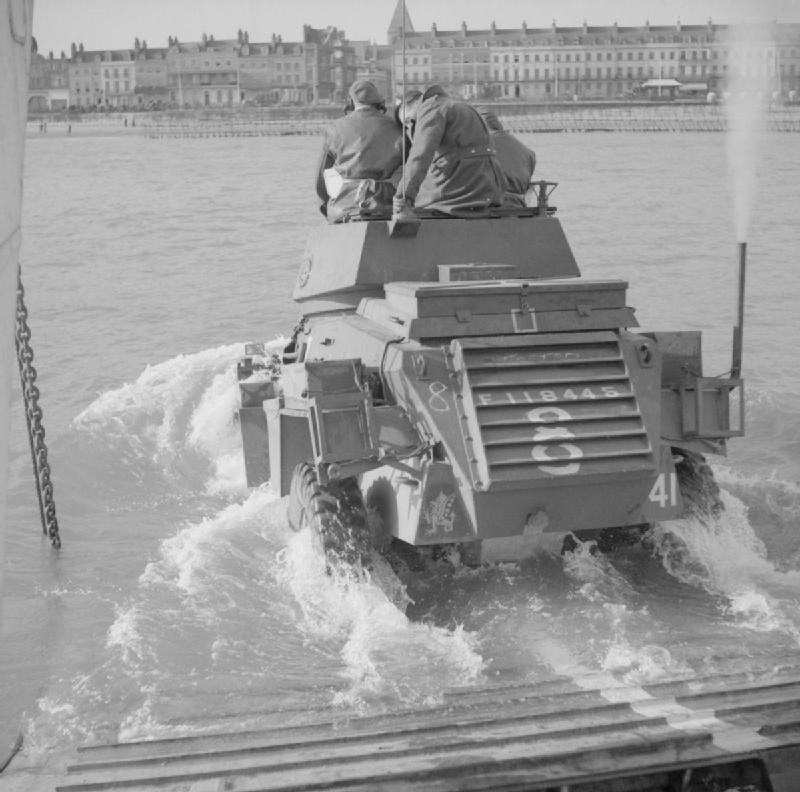
A Humber Armoured Car of 43rd Recce Regiment entering the water from a landing craft during pre-invasion wading trials at Weymouth, Dorset, 5 February 1944.

== Wreck of the Derrycunihy ==
On 18 June 1944 HQ, A and C squadrons embarked at West India Docks, London, aboard Motor Transport Ship (MTS) T72, a general purpose cargo ship named the MV Derrycunihy. T72 joined a convoy off Southend-on-Sea and arrived off Sword Beach on the evening of 20 June. High seas and enemy shelling prevented unloading for three days and it was decided to move T72 to Juno Beach for disembarkation. As the ship started engines at 07.40 on the morning of 24 June it detonated an acoustic or 'Oyster' mine dropped by one of the nightly Luftwaffe raiders. The mine exploded under the keel, splitting the ship in two, and the after part, packed with men of 43 Recce, sank rapidly. Worse still, a 3-tonner ammunition lorry caught fire, and oil floating on the water was set alight. Landing craft and the gunboat HMS Locust quickly came alongside and picked up survivors, most of whom were evacuated to SS Cap Touraine, a former French liner. The Regimental War Diary records that 'Great gallantry was displayed by all troops in the two aft holds' and lists 183 men of the regiment lost and about 120 others evacuated wounded. In addition, 25 of the ship's crew (including Army gunners) died in the disaster, which represented the biggest single loss of life off the invasion beaches.

In the days following the sinking, the survivors were formed into a composite squadron and most of 43 Recce's vehicles were landed from the beached fore part of the "Derrycunihy". B Sqn arrived from England, together with the first reinforcements. A complete squadron was transferred to 43 Recce from the replacement unit, 161st Reconnaissance Regiment.

== Normandy ==
43 Recce was not fully up to strength until the end of July 1944. In the meantime, 43rd Division had taken part in operations near Caen and was ready to move forward at the beginning of August. Throughout 3 August 43 Recce lay up under constant fire from 88 mm guns, awaiting its first chance to intervene in the campaign. The opportunity came the following morning, but as soon as B squadron moved out up the steep hill with the infantry of 5th Battalion Duke of Cornwall's Light Infantry (DCLI), a patrol of Hawker Typhoons, 'seeing the armoured cars and the infantry intermingled saw fit to intervene'. The half-tracks of the squadron's assault troop were narrowly missed in this 'friendly fire' incident. After passing the crest, two troops turned left along the road through the woods to Ondefontaine. The village proved to be still occupied by the enemy in strength, and a brisk action took place, the armoured cars and the DCLI carrier platoon being engaged by machine-guns, a Panzer IV and two Panther tanks. B Sqn's other troop had turned the other way and probed a long way forward, meeting C Sqn, which had passed through several villages until it caught up with the enemy late in the day at Montcharivel, where leading elements of 15th (Scottish) Division had also gained contact. A firefight and mortaring went on all night. 'Thus, boldly handled, the Reconnaissance Regiment in its first battle had gained information vital to the success of Major-General Thomas's plan,' the divisional historian wrote.

=== Mont Pinçon ===
Over the next few days 43 Division's infantry were engaged in bitter fighting from Ondefontaine up onto the dominating height of Mont Pinçon. 43 Recce's next action came on 10 August, in the pursuit towards the River Orne and Falaise. Starting from St Jean le Blanc, the armoured cars and half-tracks probed south, seizing bridges, lifting mines, driving through strongly-held villages firing their Besa machine guns, clashing with German self-propelled guns and taking prisoners. Finding the opposition in that direction stiffening, Lane Fox swung the axis of advance eastwards. At one point the leading squadron found themselves in the middle of a battle between 50th (Northumbrian) Division and the enemy: 'taking no notice of disorganized German infantry, they pressed on to St Pierre la Vielle. On the far side they finally came upon the enemy digging in tanks. After this most successful day, the squadron withdrew into harbour at dusk'.

Having taken and then defended Mont Pinçon, 43rd (Wessex) Division continued in XXX Corps' advance. It crossed the Noireau on 15 August by a broken railway bridge and by wading, whereupon the engineers set to work to build a bridge. Next morning 43rd Recce and the Sherman tanks of the Sherwood Rangers Yeomanry went across to continue the pursuit of the broken enemy, who were soon caught in the Falaise pocket.

=== Vernon Bridge ===
The breakout achieved, XXX Corps drove flat out for the River Seine (Operation Loopy), with 43rd (W) Division sent ahead to make an assault crossing at Vernon. US troops had already reached the west bank of the Seine, so the convoys of recce parties, assault troops and bridging material moving eastwards had to be carefully coordinated to cross with US convoys repositioning to the south. The first convoy, Group One, consisted of nearly 1500 vehicles of 129th Brigade and supporting units, led by 43rd Recce (except A Sqn which was leading Group Two). The convoy set out early on 24 August, with 9 Troop of 43 Recce and a party of Royal Engineers (REs) out in front to assess the damage to the route over the River Eure at Pacy. The road was blocked and the bridge destroyed but US Army Engineers by-passed the roadblock and, working all night under the protection of 43 Recce, the RE built a Bailey bridge. At daybreak on 25 August, B and C Sqns of 43 Recce were the first to cross the partially complete bridge, and drove flat out for Vernon, B Sqn reaching it that afternoon, the first British troops to arrive. The rest of Group One followed once the bridge at Pacy was complete. C Squadron of 43 Recce and Cromwell tanks of 15th/19th The King's Royal Hussars were directed to sweep the left (northern) flank in case there were still Germans between the Eure and the Seine.

The following infantry secured Vernon and the selected bridging sites, and after a short bombardment began crossing the river by stormboats that evening under cover of a smokescreen. Despite heavy casualties they gained a fragile toehold on the far bank, while the REs began bridging the river. By morning, other infantry had scrambled across the broken road bridge or crossed in DUKW amphibious trucks, but the bridging sites were still under fire, and the efforts had to be halted for a while. The REs' specialist tank rafts were held up in the later road convoys, but light rafts managed to get two armoured cars of 43 Recce across to help the infantry. More infantry got across the secure the rafting sites, and by late afternoon the enemy fire from the heights across the river was reduced. At 17.30 the first light bridge was complete and the division's infantry moved over to expand the bridgehead. During the night German counter-attacks began, putting considerable pressure on the left flank position covering the rafting site. However, the first two armoured cars and the first two tanks rafted across moved up in support, and other armoured cars began moving across the light bridge before daybreak on 27 August.

Next morning two squadrons of tanks were rafted across and held off an armoured counter-attack, then the infantry and 43 Recce cleared the banks and pushed through the forest until they were firmly established on the heights. By 28 August the first heavy Bailey bridge was built, allowing 11th Armoured Division to pour across to spearhead XXX Corps' advance. After the Seine crossing, 43rd (Wessex) Division was 'grounded' and rested while the rest of XXX Corps raced across northern France and Belgium

== Netherlands and Germany ==
=== Operation Market Garden ===
The whole of 43rd Division played a major part in 'Garden', the ground part of Operation Market Garden, the failed attempt to seize river crossings up to the Lower Rhine (Nederrijn) at Arnhem via a 'carpet' of airborne troops (September 1944). The division was blamed by many airborne soldiers for its dilatory advance, though the Corps commander, Lieutenant-General Brian Horrocks, defended the division, pointing out that it could not deploy any armoured vehicles (like 43 Recce's armoured cars and half-tracks) off the single road, nicknamed 'Hell's Highway', which was cut behind them on several occasions. Nevertheless, Lane Fox was, on the orders of the divisional commander, Major-General Thomas, immediately replaced as Commanding Officer of 43 Recce (1 October 1944).

In the aftermath of Market Garden, 43 (Wessex) was stationed on 'the Island' (between the Rivers Waal and Nederrijn), lining the south bank of the Rhine. 43 Recce, with 12th Battalion King's Royal Rifle Corps from 8th Armoured Brigade under command, protected the division's open western flank. The concealed squadrons sent back reports, but were forbidden to engage the enemy in order to hide the extent of the position. However, on the night of 26/27 September a furious firefight broke out when the Germans crossed the river in strength and attempted to emplace anti-tank guns in 43 Recce's hidden positions. The divisional historian records that 'While the Division faced the monotony inseparable from static defence, the Reconnaissance Regiment fought a different type of war'. This involved guarding the western end of the Island, cooperating with the Dutch Resistance and facilitating the escape across the river of British paratroops who had evaded capture. The division then took part in defeating the German counter offensive on the Island in early October.

Later, the division's units were heavily engaged in the fighting at Geilenkirchen (Operation Clipper) (18–23 November), in the Roer Triangle during Operation Blackcock (January 1945) and in the Reichswald during Operation Veritable (February 1945). The division crossed the Rhine in March 1945 and its last significant engagement of the war was in the capture of Bremen (20–27 April 1945) and the occupation of the Cuxhaven Peninsula.

== Disbandment ==
43 Recce was disbanded on 20 April 1946 When the TA was reconstituted on 1 January 1947, 5th Bn Gloucesters was reformed as an infantry battalion once more.
