= Francis Lane Fox =

British Army officer (1899–1989)

- Born: Francis Gordon Ward Jackson; 14 October 1899
- Died: 31 July 1989 (aged 89); Bramham Park, West Yorkshire, England
- Spouse: Marcia Agnes Mary Lane Fox (m. 1929; died 1980)
- Military career
- Allegiance: United Kingdom
- Branch: British Army
- Service years: 1919–1946
- Rank: Lieutenant Colonel
- Nickname: "Joe"
- Service number: 541
- Commands: Household Cavalry Training Regiment; 43rd (Wessex) Reconnaissance Regiment; Yorkshire Hussars
- Conflicts: Second World War (North West Europe)

Lieutenant-Colonel Francis Gordon Ward Lane Fox (formerly Jackson), (14 October 1899 – 31 July 1989) was a British Army officer and prominent Yorkshire landowner.

== Early life ==
Francis Lane Fox was the son of Claude Ward Jackson (1869–1937) and Una Whiting (née Wilcox). He was educated at Eton College and the Royal Military College, Sandhurst. He was commissioned into the Royal Horse Guards on 16 July 1919.

After service as a young officer of the Household Cavalry, 'Joe' Ward-Jackson (as he was then known) was appointed aide-de-camp to the Viceroy of India, Lord Irwin, in 1928. He met Lord Irwin's niece, Marcia Agnes Mary Lane Fox (1904–1980), eldest daughter and heiress of Lt-Col George Lane Fox (soon to be created Lord Bingley) when she visited India. They were married on 3 October 1929 and in 1937 Jackson changed his surname by deed poll to Lane Fox. In 1947 he was granted the Royal licence to bear the coat of arms of Fox.

== War service ==
Lane Fox was promoted to lieutenant-colonel on 26 June 1941, and took command of the Household Cavalry Training Regiment. On 20 September 1943 he assumed command of the 43rd (Wessex) Reconnaissance Regiment (43 Recce). The regiment, part of the Reconnaissance Corps, formed part of the 43rd (Wessex) Infantry Division, whose General Officer Commanding (GOC) was Major-General Ivor Thomas, which was training for the Normandy Landings.

=== The wreck of the Derrycunihy ===
Soon after D-Day, 43 Recce embarked on a transport named the MV Derrycunihy, which arrived off Sword Beach on the evening of 20 June. High seas and enemy shelling prevented unloading for three days and it was decided to move to Juno Beach for disembarkation. As the ship started engines on the morning of 24 June it detonated a mine dropped by a Luftwaffe raider. The mine explosion split the ship in two, and the after part, packed with soldiers, sank rapidly. Worse still, an ammunition lorry caught fire, and oil floating on the water was set alight. Landing craft and gunboats quickly came alongside and picked up survivors. The Regimental War Diary records that 'Great gallantry was displayed by all troops in the two aft holds'. Over 180 men of the regiment and 25 ships' crew and gunners were lost, and about 120 wounded of 43 Recce were evacuated. The disaster represented the biggest single loss of life off the invasion beaches.

When all the survivors had been taken off, Lane Fox and the Captain of the Derrycunihy argued over who should be last to leave the half-sunken ship.

=== Mont Pinçon ===
Once 43 Recce had been reinforced and reorganised, it took its place in the fighting line, seeing its first action on 4 August, following up the retreating Germans and gaining vital information for 43 Wessex Division's attack on Mont Pinçon. The divisional historian praises the Recce regiment for its boldness in this action. 43rd Wessex took Mont Pinçon after bitter fighting and on 10 August 43 Recce advanced boldly again, seizing bridges and slipping between pockets of German resistance.

=== "Hell's Highway" ===
Following the German defeat in Normandy, the Allies advanced rapidly, until they came to the canals and rivers of the Netherlands. A bold plan (Operation Market Garden) was conceived whereby airborne troops seized bridges to allow fast-moving ground forces to 'bounce' the river crossings up to and including the Rhine at Arnhem. The parachute and glider drop went in on 17 September and the ground advance was led by the Guards Armoured Division, with 43rd Wessex given the vital task of following up and keeping the precarious single road open behind them. The plan failed: the British 1st Airborne Division was only able to reach the north end of Arnhem Bridge, and eventually were driven off. When 43rd Wessex arrived, it was too late. All they could do was make a desperate attempt to cross the Rhine by boat, and when that failed to assist the evacuation of the survivors of 1st Airborne during the night of 25 September 1944.

The 43rd (Wessex) Division was blamed by many airborne soldiers for its dilatory advance However, Lieutenant-General Brian Horrocks, GOC of XXX Corps (under whose command the 43rd Division was serving), defended the division, pointing out that it could not deploy any armoured vehicles (like 43 Recce's armoured cars and half-tracks) off the single road, nicknamed "Hell's Highway," which was cut behind them on several occasions. Nevertheless, Lane Fox was immediately replaced as CO of 43 Recce (1 October 1944) by Major-General Thomas, the 43rd's GOC. The divisional history describes Lane Fox's departure as "a sad loss to the Regiment. Throughout the Normandy battle his constant presence with the forward troops his traditional high standards of honour and his indifference to personal danger had endeared him to all ranks".

In 1945, Lane Fox was appointed to command the Yorkshire Hussars, of which his father-in-law Lord Bingley was honorary colonel. He retired from the Army in 1946.

== Later life and family ==
After the death of Lord Bingley in 1947, Francis and the Hon Marcia Lane Fox took over the running of the Bramham Park estate. They had 3 children and 8 grandchildren:

- Major George Francis Lane Fox, Royal Horse Guards (born 15 May 1931, died 9 October 2012), married on 10 August 1962 to Helen Victoria Duff and had 3 sons:
  - Captain George Charles Nicholas Lane Fox (born 25 December 1963), current head of the Lane Fox-family, married to the Hon. Rachel Baring and has 5 children:
    - Sophie Grey Lane Fox (born 1991)
    - Captain George Sackville Lane Fox (born 1992), married on 22 April 2023 to Elizabeth Katie Allner
    - Frederick Evelyn Lane Fox (born 1994)
    - Charles Edward Lane Fox (born 1996)
    - Harry Patrick Lane Fox (born 1998)
  - James Richard Lane Fox (born 1966)
  - Captain Edward Sackville Lane Fox (born 1976), former private secretary to the Duke and Duchess of Sussex
- Richard Sackville Lane Fox (born 19 September 1933, died 25 October 2014), married on 11 June 1960 to the Hon. Janet Hamilton and had 2 children.
- Marcia Elizabeth Lane Fox (born 12 October 1940, died 26 August 2020), married on 12 October 1963 to Anthony Charles Wakeham and had 3 children.

Lt-Col Francis Lane Fox died on 31 July 1989, aged 89, at Bramham Park.
