= 43rd (Wessex) Infantry Division =

Wessex Division 43rd (1st Wessex) Division 43rd (Wessex) Infantry Division 43rd (Wessex) Division/District
- Formation patch of the 43rd Division during the Second World War
- Active: 1908–1919; 1920–1945; 1947–1967
- Country: United Kingdom
- Branch: Territorial Army
- Type: Infantry
- Size: Division
- Peacetime HQ: Exeter
- Nicknames: 'Fighting Wessex Wyverns' 'Yellow Devils' 'The Wicked Wyvern'
- Engagements: World War II; Operation Epsom; Operation Jupiter (Hill 112); Operation Express; Operation Bluecoat (Mont Pinçon); Vernon Bridge; Operation Market Garden; Operation Clipper; Operation Blackcock; Operation Veritable; Operation Plunder

Commanders
- Notable commanders: Arthur Percival; Sir Ivor Thomas; Sir George Erskine

The 43rd (Wessex) Infantry Division was an infantry division of Britain's Territorial Army (TA). The division was first formed in 1908, as the Wessex Division. During the First World War, it was broken-up and never served as a complete formation. It was reformed in the TA in 1920, and then served in the campaign in North West Europe from June 1944 until May 1945, during the Second World War. The division suffered heavy casualties and gained an excellent reputation. After the Second World War, the division formed part of the postwar TA, and became the 43rd (Wessex) Division/District in 1961. It was finally disbanded in 1967.

== Formation ==
The Territorial Force (TF) was formed on 1 April 1908 following the enactment of the Territorial and Reserve Forces Act 1907 (7 Edw.7, c.9) which combined and re-organised the old Volunteer Force, the Honourable Artillery Company and the Yeomanry. On formation, the TF contained 14 infantry divisions and 14 mounted yeomanry brigades. One of the divisions was the Wessex Division.

The Wessex Division was formed in Southern Command from TF units in the south-western counties of Cornwall, Devon, Dorset, Hampshire, Somerset and Wiltshire. (Note: Roughly the central and western parts of the Anglo-Saxon kingdom and earldom of Wessex.) In peacetime, the divisional headquarters was at 19 Cathedral Close in Exeter.

Wessex Division Order of Battle 1908–1914

- Divisional HQ at Exeter
- Hampshire Brigade at Southampton
  - 4th Battalion, Hampshire Regiment at Winchester (joined 12th Indian Division and served in Mesopotamia)
  - 5th Battalion, Hampshire Regiment at Southampton (served in Third Afghan War)
  - 6th (Duke of Connaught's Own) Battalion, Hampshire Regiment at Portsmouth (joined 15th Indian Division and served in Mesopotamia)
  - 7th Battalion, Hampshire Regiment at Bournemouth (served in Aden)
- South-Western Brigade at Taunton
  - 4th Battalion, Somerset Light Infantry at Bath (joined 37th Indian Brigade and served in Mesopotamia)
  - 5th Battalion, Somerset Light Infantry at Taunton (joined 75th Division and served in Palestine)
  - 4th Battalion, Dorsetshire Regiment at Dorchester (joined 42nd Indian Brigade and served in Mesopotamia)
  - 4th Battalion, Wiltshire Regiment at Trowbridge (joined 75th Division and served in Palestine)
- Devon & Cornwall Brigade at Exeter
  - 4th Battalion, Devonshire Regiment at Exeter (joined 41st Indian Brigade and served in Mesopotamia)
  - 5th (Prince of Wales's) Battalion, Devonshire Regiment at Plymouth (joined 75th Division and served in Palestine)
  - 6th Battalion, Devonshire Regiment at Barnstaple (joined 36th Indian Brigade and served in Mesopotamia)
  - 4th Battalion, Duke of Cornwall's Light Infantry at Truro (served in Aden, later with 75th Division in Palestine)
- Divisional Royal Artillery
- I Wessex Brigade, Royal Field Artillery at Portsmouth (joined 3rd (Lahore) Division and served in Mesopotamia)
  - 1st Hampshire Battery
  - 2nd Hampshire Battery
  - 3rd Hampshire Battery
  - 1st Wessex Ammunition Column
- II Wessex (Howitzer) Brigade, Royal Field Artillery at Ryde, Isle of Wight
  - 4th Hampshire (Howitzer) Battery (served in Aden)
  - 5th Hampshire (Howitzer) Battery (joined 6th (Poona) Division and served in Mesopotamia; captured at Kut)]
  - 2nd Wessex Ammunition Column
- III Wessex Brigade, Royal Field Artillery at Swindon (served in Third Afghan War)
  - 6th Hampshire Battery
  - Dorsetshire Battery
  - Wiltshire Battery
  - 3rd Wessex Ammunition Column
- IV Wessex Brigade, Royal Field Artillery at Exeter
  - 1st Devonshire Battery
  - 2nd Devonshire Battery
  - 3rd Devonshire Battery (served in Third Afghan War)
  - 4th Wessex Ammunition Column
- Wessex (Hampshire) Heavy Battery, Royal Garrison Artillery and Ammunition Column at Cosham (served on the Western Front)
- Wessex Divisional Engineers (joined 27th Division and served at Salonika)
  - 1st Wessex Field Company at Bath (became 500th Field Company)
  - 2nd Wessex Field Company at Weston-super-Mare (became 501st Field Company)
  - Wessex Divisional Telegraph Company ('Signal Company' from 1910) at Exeter
- Divisional Royal Army Medical Corps (joined 8th Division and served on the Western Front)
  - 1st Wessex Field Ambulance at Exeter (became 24th Field Ambulance)
  - 2nd Wessex Field Ambulance at Plymouth (became 25th Field Ambulance)
  - 3rd Wessex Field Ambulance at Portsmouth (became 26th Field Ambulance)
  - Wessex Clearing Hospital at Exeter
- Wessex Divisional Transport & Supply Column, Army Service Corps, at Exeter (joined 29th Division and served at Gallipoli)
  - Divisional Company at Andover (became 246 Company)
  - Devonshire and Cornwall Company at Plymouth (became 247 Company)
  - South Western Brigade Company at Bridgwater (became 248 Company)
  - Hampshire Brigade Company at Aldershot (became 249 Company)

== First World War ==
On 29 July 1914, the Wessex Division was in the Salisbury Plain Training Area carrying out its annual training camp when 'precautionary orders' were received, and next day the division took up emergency war stations in Somerset, Devon and Cornwall. The order to mobilise arrived on the evening of 4 August. Between 10 and 13 August the division concentrated on Salisbury Plain and began war training.

On 24 September, at the special request of the Secretary of State for War, Earl Kitchener of Khartoum the Wessex Division accepted liability for service in British India to relieve the Regular Army units there for service on the Western Front. The division's infantry battalions (without their brigade headquarters) and artillery brigades embarked at Southampton on 8 October and were convoyed to Bombay, disembarking on 9 November. The engineers, medical units, transport, heavy battery and brigade ammunition columns also remained in the UK and joined formations composed of Regular units brought back from India and other imperial garrisons. Meanwhile, the battalions and batteries were immediately distributed to garrisons across India, reverting to peacetime service conditions, and the Wessex Division never saw service as a whole, though it was formally numbered the 43rd (1st Wessex) Division in 1915 and the brigades were designated 128th (Hampshire) Brigade, 129th (South Western) Brigade and 130th (Devon and Cornwall) Brigade.

As soon as the Wessex Division had left for India, the home depots began raising 2nd Line units, distinguished from the 1st Line by a '2/' prefix. Recruitment and training of the 2nd Wessex Division proceeded so well that it was also sent to India in December 1914, and later received the notional title of 45th (2nd Wessex) Division.

By early 1915 the need was growing for troops to be sent to various theatres of war, and the first drafts and formed units from the 1st Wessex Division began to go on active service, particularly to the Mesopotamian Front. By the end of the war only one battalion and five batteries remained in India, and most of these then participated in the Third Anglo-Afghan War.

== Second World War ==
=== Mobilisation and training ===
43rd (Wessex) Division was reformed in 1920 and became part of the Territorial Army, which replaced the TF. In the period of international tension preceding the outbreak of the Second World War, the existing territorial divisions (known as the first-line) helped form new formations, known as the second-line. This process was known as duplicating. The division's duplicate was the 45th Infantry Division.

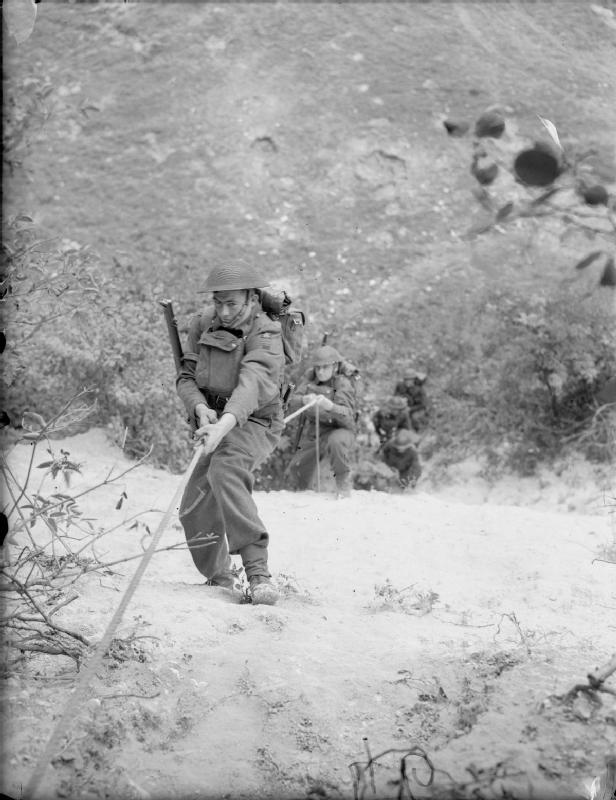
Soldiers of 4th Bn, Wiltshire Regiment, climbing the sheer face of a chalk quarry during 'toughening up' training at Leeds, Kent, 18 September 1941.

The TA was mobilised on the outbreak of war in September 1939 and the division began training in its home area. In May 1940 it was preparing to go overseas to join the British Expeditionary Force (BEF) in France, but the German invasion of the Low Countries on 10 May ended the 'Phoney War' before the division was ready. When the Battle of France was lost and the BEF was being evacuated from Dunkirk, 43rd (W) Division was one of the few reasonably well-equipped formations left in Home Forces to counter a German invasion of the United Kingdom. It formed part of the mobile GHQ Reserve disposed on the line from Northampton through North London to Aldershot, from which brigade groups could be despatched to any threatened area. During the period when invasion was most threatened, the division was stationed just north of London.

By the end of 1940 the division was stationed under XII Corps in East Kent, where it remained for the next four years, first in defensive mode, later training intensively. It was later noted that its habitual training area round Stone Street, outside Folkestone, bore a marked resemblance to the Bocage countryside in Normandy where it would later fight.

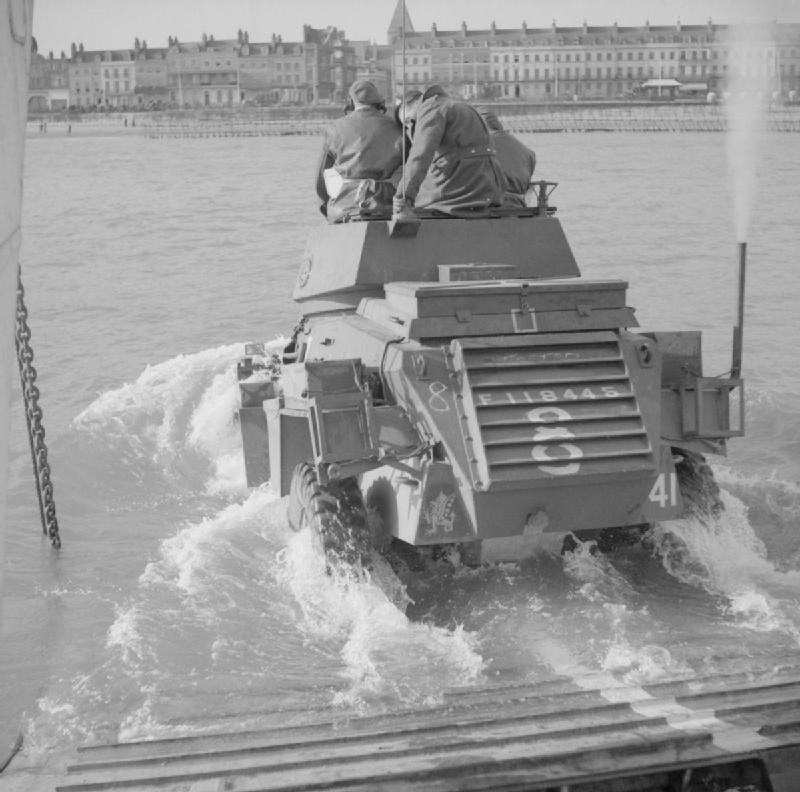
A Humber Armoured Car of 43rd Recce Regiment entering the water from a landing craft during wading trials at Weymouth, Dorset, 5 February 1944.

In 1942, however, after the German invasion of the Soviet Union and the entrance of the United States into the war, the situation changed and the 43rd Division started training for offensive operations to return to mainland Europe. Throughout most of 1942, the division was part of XII Corps, serving alongside the 46th Infantry Division and 53rd (Welsh) Infantry Division. XII Corps was, at the time, commanded by Lieutenant-General Bernard Montgomery.

In March 1942, the division also gained a new General Officer Commanding (GOC) in the form of Major-General Ivor Thomas. Thomas was a decorated officer who had served as a young battery commander in the Royal Artillery on the Western Front during the First World War where he was twice wounded and awarded the Military Cross and the Distinguished Service Order. He would command the 43rd Division until September 1945. Thomas was an effective but hard-driving commander, humourless and not universally liked, sometimes known as 'Butcher', or more jocularly by Lt-Gen Brian Horrocks and others as 'Von Thoma', after the German Lt-Gen Wilhelm Ritter von Thoma captured after the Battle of Alamein. (Horrocks also jokingly referred to Thomas's command as the 'Wicked Wyvern'). Critics of his training methods regarded 43rd (Wessex) Division as 'the most over-exercised in the Army'.

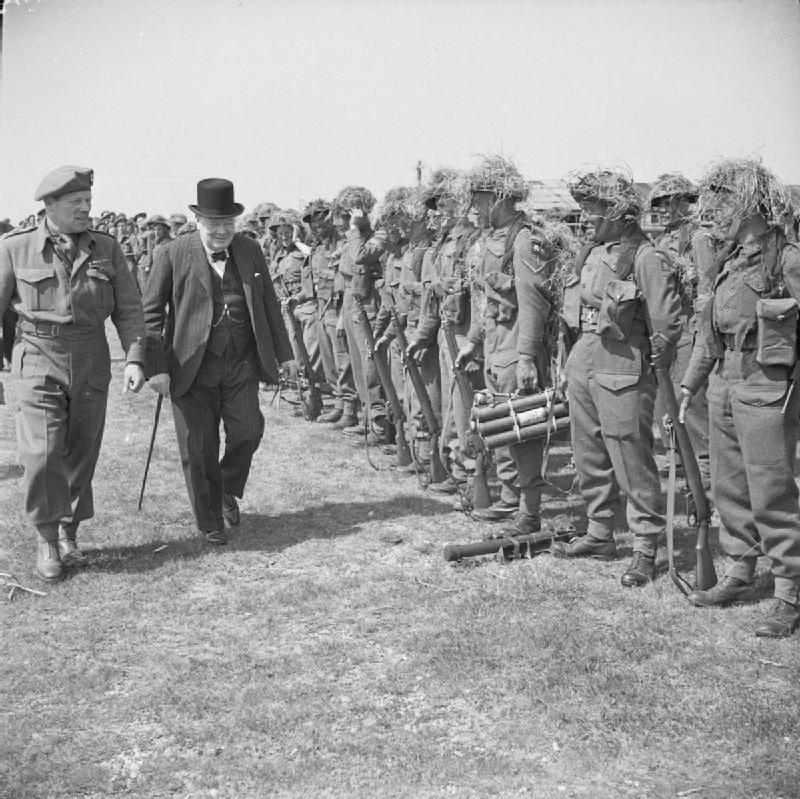
The British Prime Minister, Winston Churchill, inspects men of 4th Bn, Somerset Light Infantry, during a tour of forces preparing to invade Normandy, 12 May 1944.

In June 1942, the 128th Infantry Brigade (consisting of three battalions of the Hampshire Regiment) was transferred to 46th Infantry Division. It was replaced first by 25th and later 34th Army Tank Brigade as part of an experiment with 'Mixed Divisions'. However the experiment was abandoned (deemed unsuitable for the type of terrain in North-western Europe) in late 1943 and the 34th Tank Brigade was replaced, in October 1943, by the 214th Independent Infantry Brigade, a Home Defence formation raised during the war that had been serving in Hampshire and Dorset District. After service in the Isle of Wight, 214th Brigade had received specialised training in combined operations under the Royal Marines at Inverary, and retained an individuality within the division. 214th Brigade would remain with the 43rd Division for the rest of the war.

=== Operation Overlord ===
XII Corps and 43rd (Wessex) Division were assigned to 21st Army Group for the Allied invasion of Normandy (Operation Overlord). They were follow-up formations, with 43rd (Wessex) Division scheduled to complete its landings 14 days after D Day (D +14, 20 June). However, shipping delays and a storm between 19 and 22 June delayed its arrival; the division finally concentrated round Bayeux on 24 June.

HQ, A and C Squadrons of 43rd (Wessex) Reconnaissance Regiment were aboard the troopship Derrycunihy, which arrived off Sword Beach on the evening of 20 June. High seas and enemy shelling prevented unloading for three days and it was decided to move to Juno Beach for disembarkation. As the ship started engines it detonated an acoustic mine, splitting the ship in two, and the after part, packed with sleeping men of 43rd Recce Regiment, sank rapidly. Worse still, an ammunition lorry caught fire, and oil floating on the water was set alight. Landing craft and gunboats came alongside and picked up survivors, but the regiment lost 183 men, with another 120 evacuated wounded. Most of 43rd Recce Rgts's vehicles were landed from the beached fore part of the "Derrycunihy", and reinforcements were sent from England, but the regiment was not fully up to strength until the end of July 1944.

=== Operation Epsom ===
The division's first action, Operation Epsom starting on 26 June, involved following 15th (Scottish) Division's advance and then securing the captured objectives. However, this entailed some heavy fighting by 5th Battalion Duke of Cornwall's Light Infantry (DCLI) against a Panzer counter-attack at Cheux on 27 June. The supporting 17-pounder anti-tank guns were knocked out and the infantry had to stalk Panther tanks with their lighter 6-pounder anti-tank guns and hand-held PIATs. Other battalions mopped up the important objective of Manvieux. On 28 June 1st Battalion Worcestershire Regiment made an attack from Cheux against Mouen: they had to cross open cornfields, but had support from the whole divisional artillery and heavy mortars plus two medium artillery regiments. The infantry followed the Creeping barrage of smoke and High explosive shells and forced their way into the houses and gardens, using PIATs against those German tanks that had survived the barrage. On 29 June 129 Brigade advanced under fire to ford the River Odon and dug in, a German counter-attack against them in the evening being destroyed by the divisional artillery.

=== Hill 112 ===
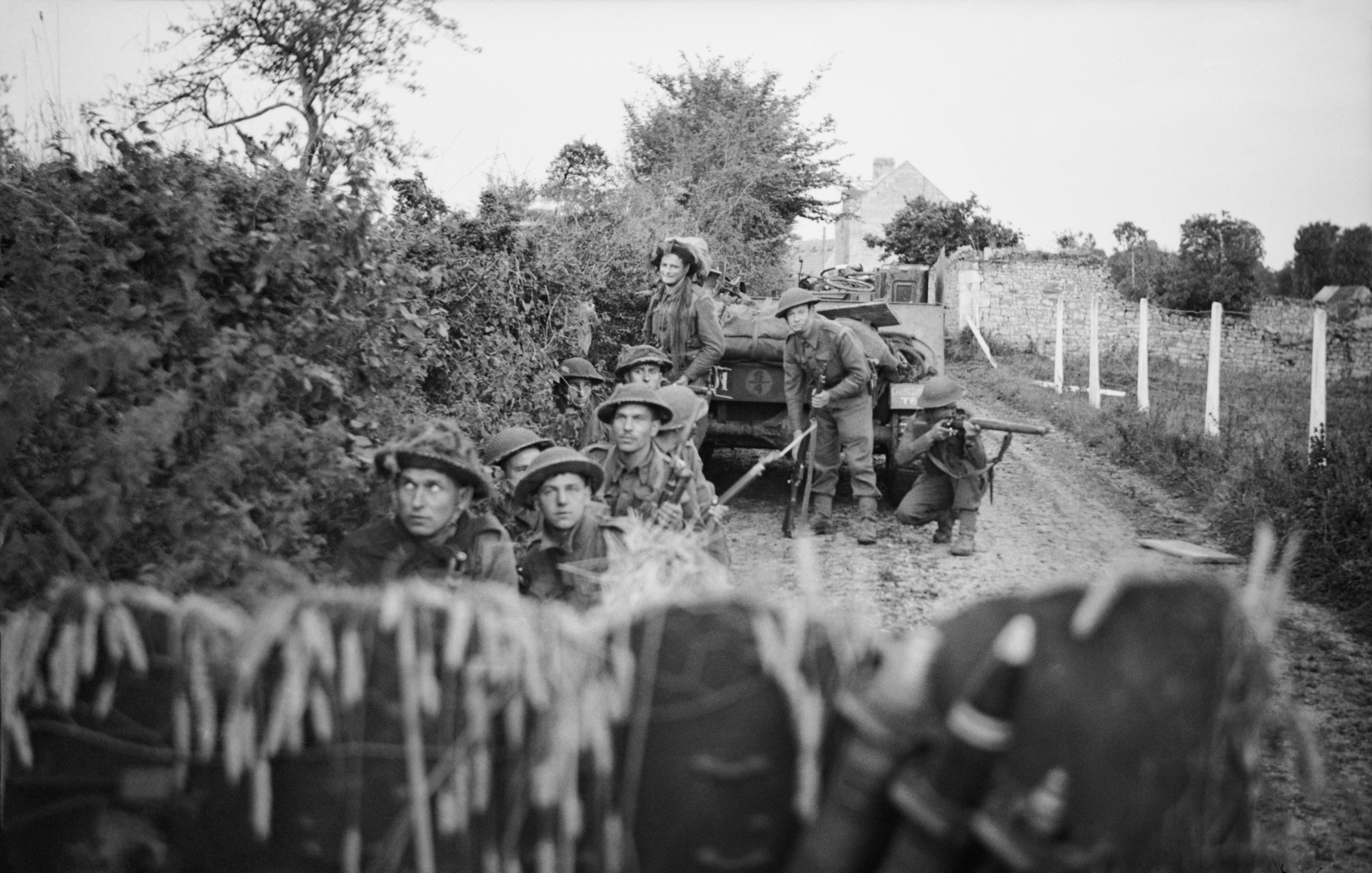
Troops of 4th battalion Dorsetshire regiment C company sheltering from mortar fire during Operation Jupiter, 10 July 1944.

The division's first major offensive action of its own was Operation Jupiter, to take Hill 112, which had been briefly captured by British armour during 'Epsom' but had to be abandoned. The attack on 10 July was supported by all the divisional artillery and mortars, plus the artillery of 15th (Scottish) Division and 11th Armoured Division and 3rd and 8th Army Groups Royal Artillery (AGRAs). In the first phase 129th Brigade on the right, with all three battalions in line, and 130th Brigade on the left with one battalion, were to capture the hill and the road from it to Château de Fontaine. They were supported by Churchill tanks from 31st Tank Brigade. Then, while 129th Brigade formed a secure south-west flank, 130th Brigade and Churchill Crocodile flamethrowing tanks from 79th Armoured Division were to advance from Château de Fontaine to capture Eterville and Maltot and the high ground to the south-east. Finally, 214th Brigade in Kangaroo armoured personnel carriers accompanied by 4th Armoured Brigade was supposed to break through to the River Orne and seize bridgeheads.

The massive barrage stunned but failed to suppress the defenders from 10th SS Panzer Division. When the Wessex infantry went forward they came under heavy fire and had to clear defenders from the dugouts and defensive positions of their outpost line on the forward slopes. 5th Battalion Dorsets and 9th Royal Tank Regiment, leading 130th Brigade against the farms on the lower ground, made quick progress, 7th Somerset Light Infantry passing through with the Churchills and Crocodiles to deal with Chateau de Fontaine. But 129th Brigade was slowed in its advance on Hill 112 itself, suffering heavy casualties on the open slopes, and then running into the recently arrived Tiger I tanks of 102nd SS Heavy Panzer Battalion, which the Churchills and corps anti-tank guns of 86th (Devon) Anti-Tank Regiment, Royal Artillery, struggled to deal with. By mid-morning 129th Brigade only had a slender toehold on the edge of the plateau. Attempting to continue 130th Brigade's advance on Maltot, 7th Hampshires and 9th RTR came under crossfire from Hill 112, while some of the Tigers reached the village first. The leading Hampshire penetrated the village, leaving strongpoints to be mopped up later by the following Dorsets, but they were driven out by counter-attacks. 4th Dorsets, making a second attack, suffered heavy casualties. Two battalions of 214th Brigade had already been drawn into the fighting around Chateau de Fontaine, leaving 5th DCLI as the last uncommitted battalion. It attacked up the slopes of Hill 112, described as 'one of the most tragic acts of self-sacrifice in the entire North West European Campaign'.

Launched at 20:30 towards 'The Orchard' on the crest of the hill, and supported by a squadron of 7th Royal Tank Regiment and all available guns, including the divisional light anti-aircraft guns, the attack reached the orchard, but could get no further. The infantry and anti-tank guns held off counter-attacks through the night from the newly-arrived 9th SS Panzer Division, and were reinforced in the morning by a company of 1st Worcesters and briefly by a squadron of Sherman tanks from the Royal Scots Greys. By mid-afternoon all the anti-tank guns on the hill had been knocked out, the tanks had to retire to the reverse slope, and the defence was almost over. The order was given to withdraw and 60 survivors of 5th DCLI were brought down. Both sides remained dug in on the slopes, with the hilltop left in No man's land. The division had to hold its positions under mortar fire for another 14 days, described by the commander of 214th Brigade as comparable only 'to the bombardment at Passchendaele'. This defence was followed by a final set-piece attack, Operation Express, in which 4th and 5th Wiltshires and 7th RTR succeeded in capturing Maltot on 22 July.

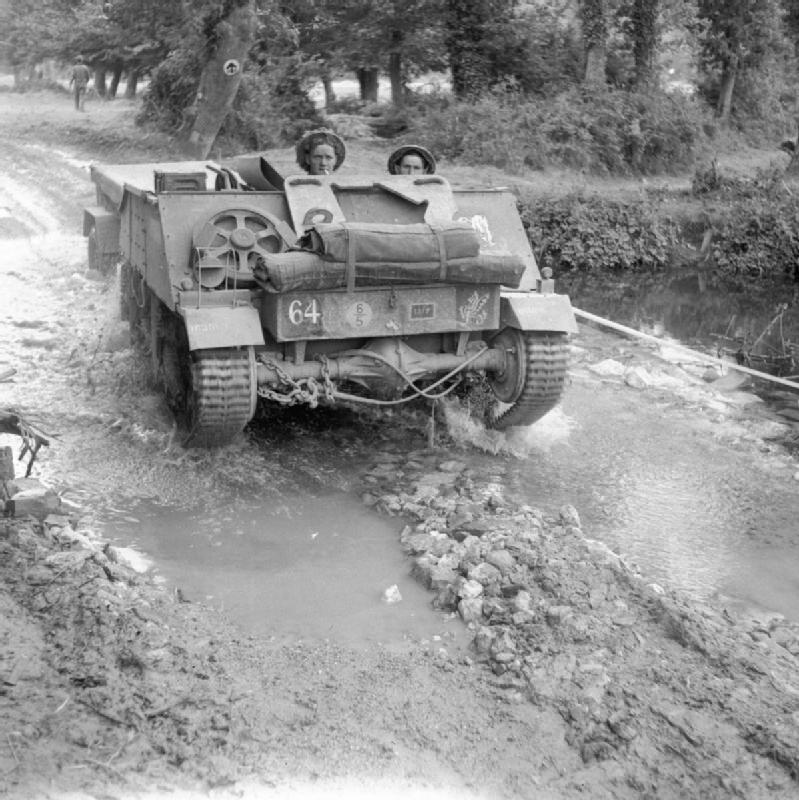
A Lloyd carrier of 8th Bn, Middlesex Regiment, the divisional machine gun battalion, advances during operations in the Odon valley, west of Caen, 16 July 1944.

Overall, 43rd (Wessex) Division performed well in Normandy and was considered by many senior British officers to be one of the best divisions of the British Army during the war. For the rest of the war Bernard Montgomery, commanding all British and Canadian troops in the campaign, preferred to use formations such as 43rd (Wessex) and 15th (Scottish) to spearhead his assaults. This was mainly due to issues of morale because veteran formations such as the 7th Armoured and 51st (Highland), both of which had seen extensive service in North Africa and Italy (and fought poorly in Normandy, according to senior officers), were judged as tired and war-weary with morale being almost dangerously fragile. With formations that had spent years in the United Kingdom training such as the 43rd (Wessex), 15th (Scottish), 11th Armoured and 59th (Staffordshire) Divisions the problem of morale was less of an issue.

=== Mont Pinçon ===
After a short rest 43rd (Wessex) Division moved to XXX Corps to launch an attack towards the dominating height of Mont Pinçon as part of Operation Bluecoat. 8th Armoured Brigade was assigned to support the infantry. Starting at 08.00 on 30 July, the division was to force its way through enemy positions at Briquessard and advance through Cahagnes towards Ondefontaine. 130th Brigade led, reinforced by 4th Somerset Light Infantry and Sherman tanks of the Sherwood Rangers Yeomanry, followed by 214th Brigade and then 129th Brigade. Initial casualties were heavy, particularly from mines, and the advance achieved only 1,000 yards (910 m) on the first day. It took until the following morning to clear the mines and restart the advance with 214th Brigade and the tanks of 4th/7th Dragoon Guards. At 17.30 the brigade broke through, and 1st Worcesters riding on the tanks got beyond Cahagnes by nightfall. 7th Somerset Light Infantry cleared the village in the dark and, with the aid of the divisional artillery, fought off a counter-attack accompanied by heavy armour (probably Jagdpanthers) that had to be stalked with PIATs.

The division fought its way forward during 1 August, then at 02.00 on 2 August 129th Brigade began its advance on Ondefontaine. It was a day of slow but steady progress against rifle and machine gun fire from commanding positions on the ridge in front, followed by another pre-dawn attack towards Ondefontaine, while 214th Brigade began working its way towards Mont Pinçon. 5th DCLI and B Squadron 4th/7th DG, supported by the divisional artillery and mortars, reached the top of the ridge and engaged enemy infantry and armour, while 1st Worcesters worked round the flank and took the crest. 43rd Recce Regiment (reformed after the Derrycunihy disaster) then went through to unhinge the Ondefontaine defences. The division was now facing east, with Mont Pinçon only 4 miles (6.4 km) away.

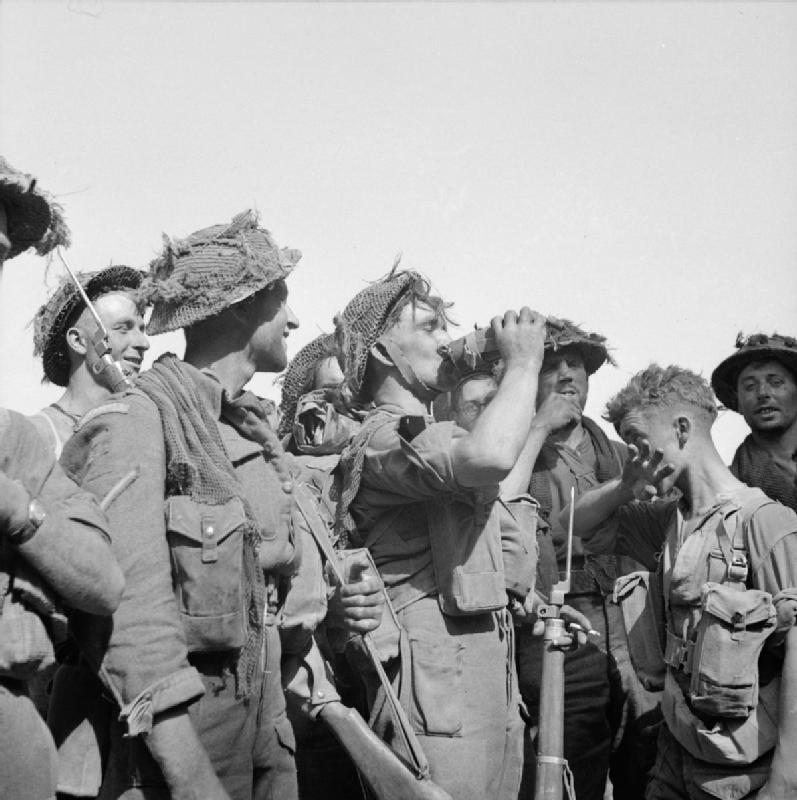
Sergeant Clifford Brown of the Somerset Light Infantry quenches his thirst with other members of his platoon during the attack on Mont Pinçon, 7 August 1944.

At 08.00 on 5 August, 4th Wiltshires moved out with B Squadron 13th/18th Royal Hussars, picking their way through the narrow lanes, while A Sqn took a parallel route carrying 5th Wiltshires. 4th Wiltshires found a bridge blown and went ahead without their tanks towards the strongly-held village of St Jean-le-Blanc, breaking up a counter-attack by calling down artillery fire. About 16.00 the battalion pioneers managed to bridge the stream and a Troop of B Sqn crossed, but withdrew to 'harbour' at dusk. Meanwhile, 5th Wiltshires got to the bridge over the Druance at the foot of Mont Pinçon but failed to capture it by the end of the day. Generals Ivor Thomas and Brian Horrocks (who had just taken command of XXX Corps) were anxious to push on, and had already cancelled Operation Blackwater, designed to reach the River Noireau, because it was too risky with Mont Pinçon still in enemy hands.

A new attack was planned for 6 August, with 130th Brigade making a feint to the north, while 129th Brigade continued from the west. In the end, the dominating position fell to a surprise attack. 4th Somerset Light Infantry and the reduced 5th Wiltshires fought their way forward through sweltering weather all day. 5th Wiltshires secured the crossroads at La Variniere and 4th Wiltshires was due to pass through them, when at about 18.00 A Sqn 13th/18th Hussars managed to get two Troops up a steep track to the top of the hill. By 18.30, seven Shermans were on the summit, attempting to mount an all-round defence and calling for infantry support. A staff officer ran up to Lt-Gen Horrocks at XXX Corps HQ, shouting 'We've got it, sir!' As fog descended on the hill, the 4th Wiltshires and the rest of A and B Sqns of the Hussars picked their way up the almost undefended track, followed by 4th Somerset LI. By daybreak the summit was firmly held, despite heavy German bombardment, and 5th Wiltshires and C Sqn still held the crossroads below. 214th Brigade relieved the exhausted troops that morning.

Having taken and then defended Mont Pinçon, 43rd (Wessex) Division participated in XXX Corps' advance. It crossed the Noireau on 15 August by a broken railway bridge and by wading, whereupon 204 Field Company RE set to work with a waterproofed bulldozer to build a tank ford and a trestle bridge named 'Genesis'. 553 Field Company and 207 Field Park Company then built the division's first Bailey bridge across the site of the railway bridge. The main opposition came from mortars and booby-trapped mines. Next morning 43rd Recce and the Sherwood Foresters were ready to continue the pursuit of the broken enemy, who were soon caught in the Falaise pocket.

=== Vernon Bridge ===
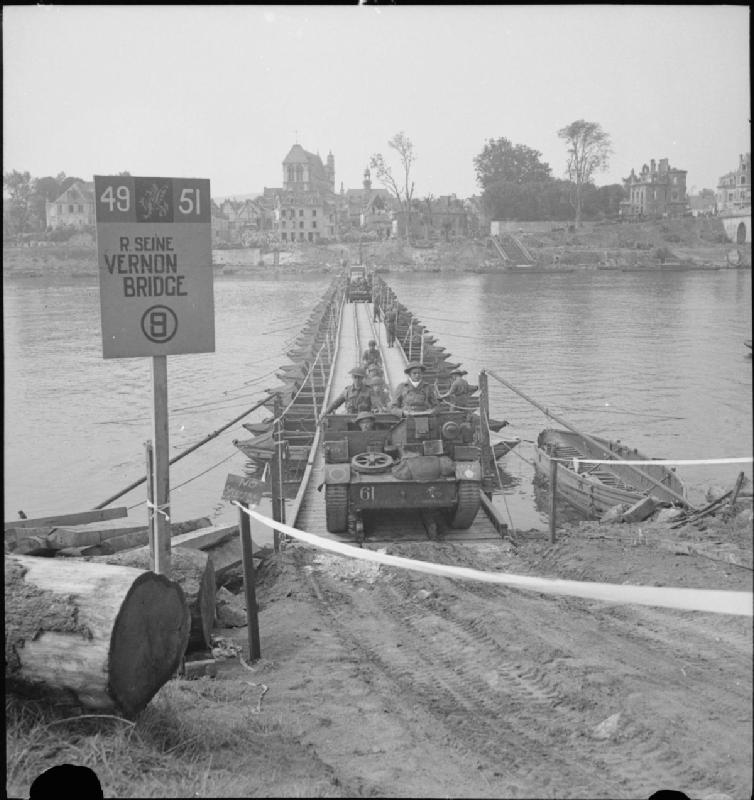
4th Dorsets cross 'David', the Class 9 FBE bridge at Vernon, 27 August 1944. The numbers 49 and 51 either side of the Wessex Wyvern divisional badge are the identification serials of 204 and 553 Field Companies RE.

The breakout achieved, XXX Corps drove flat out for the River Seine (Operation Loopy), with 43rd (W) Division sent ahead to make an assault crossing at Vernon. For this operation it was assisted by the bridging specialists of 15th (Kent) GHQ Troops Royal Engineers, a medium artillery regiment and the Cromwell tanks of 15th/19th The King's Royal Hussars, the armoured reconnaissance regiment of 11th Armoured Division. US troops had already reached the west bank of the Seine, so the convoys of assault troops and bridging material moving eastwards had to be carefully coordinated to cross with US convoys repositioning to the south. The first convoy, Group One, consisted of nearly 1500 vehicles of 129th Brigade with its usual proportion of divisional artillery, engineers and support services, reinforced by 1st Worcesters. Some of the assault infantry rode in the 536 Company RASC Group B DUKW amphibious trucks that were to carry them over the river. The group arrived at Vernon on the afternoon of 25 August, ready to begin the assault that evening against the defenders from 49th German Infantry Division.

15th (Kent) GHQTRE was tasked with manning the DUKWs during the initial assault and then operating rafts until the first bridge could be laid. They also had storm boats in reserve but these had to be used in the first wave because launching points for DUKWs were hard to find. A 15-minute bombardment by the guns of 94th (Dorset Yeomanry) Field Regiment, 121st (West Riding) Medium Regiment (further back in Group Two) and C Sqn, 15th/19th Hussars, together with the heavy mortars of 8th Middlesex, was followed by a smoke barrage to cover the crossing at 19.00. On the right, 5th Wiltshires began crossing in eight storm boats manned by 15th (Kent) GHQTRE, but they grounded before reaching the far side, and were raked by machine gun fire. By the end of an hour only one boat remained. Only about a company had got across, and they were overrun during the night. Three of the four available 536 Company DUKWs also grounded, the survivor ferrying across the rest of 5th Wiltshires in the dark. On the left, 4th Somerset LI got across in the storm boats relatively easily, but found that their bridgehead was on an island, and they were still cut off from the east bank, apart from a few men who scrambled over the wreckage of the railway bridge. 1st Worcesters failed to get over the broken road bridge into the village of Vernonnet, which was strongly held. In the dark 260th Field Company managed to bulldoze a slipway for the 536 Company RASC DUKWs, speeding up the crossing, and 129th Brigade got about a battalion and a half across in total, setting up a perimeter along the escarpment above the bridging site.

The Wessex field companies now began work under fire on a Class 9 (9 tonne maximum load) Folding Boat Equipment (FBE) bridge while the infantry fought to expand the bridgehead and clear Vernonnet. The Worcesters got over the broken bridge, and light rafts began to get 6-pounder anti-tank guns and armoured cars of the recce regiment across, but work on the bridge was halted by heavy fire until 5th DCLI and 7th Somerset LI from newly-arrived 214th Brigade struggled across the broken road bridge into Vernonnet. By nightfall the bridgehead was reasonably secure, the FBE bridge named 'David' was complete and 15th (Kent) GHQTRE's rafting troops were arriving to get a tank ferry into operation before morning. 7th Army Troops Royal Engineers had also arrived to begin a Class 40 Bailey Bridge.

Next morning (27 August) a squadron each of 15th/19th Hussars' Cromwells and 4th/7th DGs' Shermans were rafted across and held off an armoured counter-attack, the infantry and 43rd Recce cleared the banks and pushed through the forest until they were firmly established on the heights. By 28 August, 7th ATRE working under shellfire had built their Class 40 bridge, codenamed 'Goliath', and 11th Armoured was beginning to pour across to spearhead XXX Corps' advance. A second Class 40 named 'Saul' was built by 15th (Kent) GHQRE. After the Seine crossing, 43rd (Wessex) Division was 'grounded' while the rest of XXX Corps raced across northern France and Belgium. The division rested and received reinforcements (many of them experienced men drafted from the disbanded 59th (Staffordshire) Division).

=== Market Garden ===
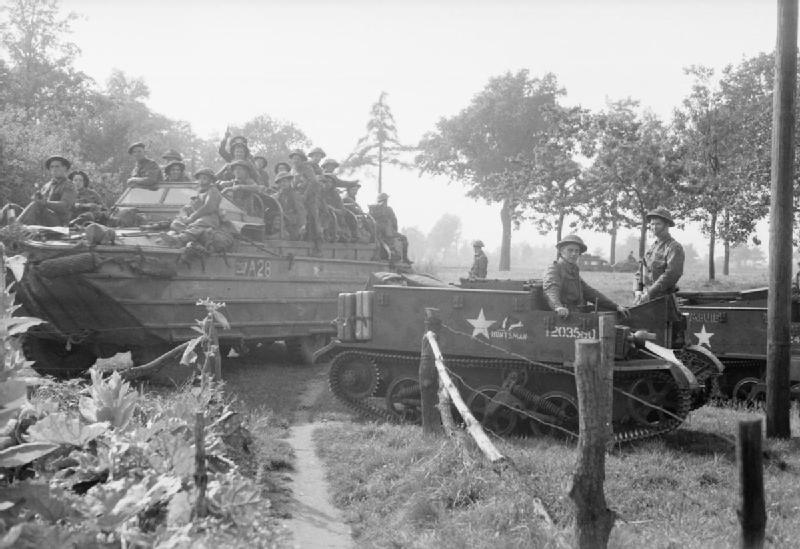
Universal Carriers and DUKWs carry the men of 5th Bn, Duke of Cornwall's Light Infantry, into battle during Operation Market Garden, 18 September 1944.

When 43rd (Wessex) Division next moved, the war was now 250 miles (400 km) away. The first elements moved up to Brussels to protect headquarters and carry out engineering works, then the division concentrated at Diest to take part in Operation Market Garden, beginning on 17 September. In 'Garden', the ground part of the operation, XXX Corps was to link river crossings up to the Nederrijn at Arnhem via a 'carpet' of airborne troops. 43rd (Wessex) Division accompanied by 8th Armoured Bde was to follow Guards Armoured Division, carrying out assault crossings if any of the bridges were found to be destroyed, and guarding the 'corridor' to Arnhem. The advance up the only road ('Club Route') was slow but on 21 September 43rd (Wessex) Division caught up with the Guards at Nijmegen. Further progress was blocked by strong German forces, and 1st Airborne Division holding out at Arnhem was in a desperate plight. 43rd (Wessex) Division was ordered to pass through the Guards the following morning and make an all-out effort to reach the Nederrijn by a side road. The Germans were found to be dug in at Oosterhout and the countryside was so boggy that it was impossible to move vehicles off the road, making outflanking moves too slow. Despite the shortage of artillery ammunition coming up the precarious line of communication, the whole of the divisional artillery and heavy mortars were used, but it was evening before the division got through. 5th DCLI, supported by a squadron of 4th/7th DG, was ordered to make a dash over the last 10 miles (16 km) to get in touch with the Polish Parachute Brigade at Driel on the south bank of the Nederrijn. The journey took only 30 minutes, but the road behind the column was cut by German tanks that had to be hunted down and destroyed before support could be brought up. Attempts to launch DUKWs with supplies for 1st Airborne were unsuccessful.

The whole of 23 September was taken up with getting support through to 5th DCLI and the Poles and in clearing the main road, though 43rd Recce Rgt was able to exploit westwards. During the night 5th Dorsets and the divisional engineers ferried a few hundred Poles across the Nederrijn in assault boats to reinforce 1st Airborne Division's shrinking perimeter. 4th Dorsets and the engineers made another assault crossing on the night of 24/25 September, suffering heavy casualties and getting few supplies across. By now 1st Airborne had been effectively destroyed, and the only course now was to evacuate the survivors. Their radios had been inoperable, and the only communication link had been through 64th (London) Medium Regiment, RA, attached to 43rd (Wessex) Division. Through this link the code word for the evacuation was passed, and during the night of 25/26 September a feint attack was made by 5th Wiltshires while around 2300 survivors of 1st Airborne and the Poles were ferried back to the south bank; few of 4th Dorsets made it back.

The division was blamed by many airborne soldiers for its dilatory advance to the river, though the Corps commander, Lt-Gen Horrocks, defended the division, pointing out that it could not deploy any armoured vehicles (either 8th Armoured Bde or 43rd Recce Rgt's armoured cars and half-tracks) off the single road, nicknamed 'Hell's Highway', which was cut behind them on several occasions, and praising the division's hard fighting. Nevertheless, Maj-Gen Thomas replaced the commanding officer of 43rd Recce immediately after the battle.

In the aftermath of Market Garden, 43rd (Wessex) Division was stationed on 'the Island' (between the Rivers Waal and Nederrijn). 43rd Recce Rgt, with 12th Battalion King's Royal Rifle Corps from 8th Armoured Bde under command, protected the division's open western flank. The concealed squadrons sent back reports, but were forbidden to engage the enemy in order to hide the extent of the position. However, on the night of 26/27 September a furious firefight broke out when the Germans crossed the river in strength and attempted to emplace anti-tank guns in 43rd Recce's hidden positions.

The Germans launched a serious counter-attack from the east on 1 October, attacking 129th Bde strung out guarding the road from Nijmegen to the Nederrijn. 4th Somerset LI and 5th Wiltshires fought them off at Elst for 48 hours, the divisional artillery breaking up some of the attacks, and RAF medium bombers following up. Further north, 5th Dorsets beat off 116th Panzer Division and 7th Hampshires had to dislodge enemy troops who fortified themselves in some brick kilns, with the help of RAF Typhoons. On 5 October 43rd (Wessex) handed most of its positions over to the US 101st Airborne Division, leaving the anti-tank and mortar platoons and 5th DCLI, the divisional reserve, to help out. The attacks ended after one last attempt on 6 October. 43rd Wessex continued to hold the western part of the Island. The divisional historian records that "While the Division faced the monotony inseparable from static defence, the Reconnaissance Regiment fought a different type of war". This involved guarding the western end of the Island, cooperating with the Dutch Resistance and facilitating the escape across the river of British paratroops who had evaded capture.

=== Operation Clipper ===
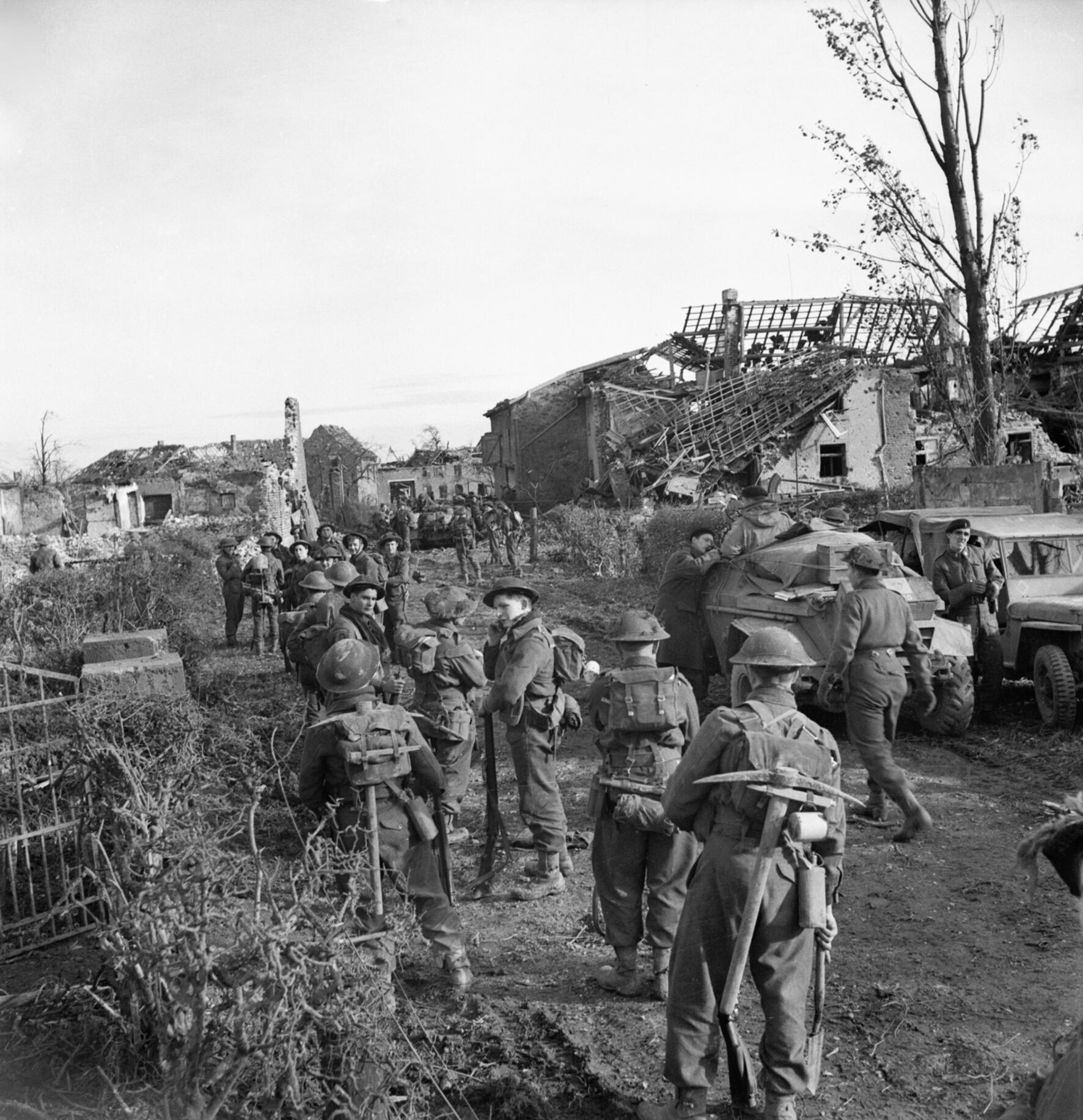
Troops of 7th Somerset Light Infantry resting during the assault on Geilenkirchen, 18 November 1944.

43rd (Wessex) Division was then shifted east with XXX Corps to cooperate with the US Ninth Army by capturing the Geilenkirchen salient (Operation Clipper). XXX Corps had 43rd Wessex and 84th US Divisions under command for this attack, which entailed breaching the Siegfried Line defences and capturing a string of fortified villages. 84th US Division attacked on the morning of 18 November, supported by British specialist armour, and was through the line of pillboxes by midday. 214th Brigade then attacked on its left in the afternoon, led by 7th Somerset LI and tanks of 4th/7th DG, and took its first objective, the village of Neiderheide. But many of the tanks and most of the supply vehicles got bogged down while 1st Worcesters were threading their way through Gilrath to form up for the second phase towards Tripsrath. Without tanks, and the artillery having shifted to another target, 1st Worcesters struggled forward under shellfire and forced their way into the village at nightfall. The traffic jam of bogged vehicles disrupted the attacks by 5th Dorsets and 5th DCLI, but they got into Bauchem and Hocheide respectively, and patrols reached Geilenkirchen itself, which was surrounded. After driving off some counter-attacks by 15th Panzer Grenadier Division during the night, Geilenkirchen was captured after a stiff fight next day. But thereafter heavy rain turned the whole battlefield into mud while the infantry struggled to consolidate their positions under heavy shellfire from the Siegfried Line guns. One wood captured and grimly held first by 4th Dorsets and then 5th Dorsets for seven days became known as 'Dorset Wood'. On 22 November 5th DCLI suffered heavy casualties trying to take the high ground near Hoven to deny the enemy observation over the two Allied divisions. Overnight both sides shared the village of Hoven, before counter-attacks came in at dawn from 10th SS Panzer Division and 21st Panzer Division. Horrocks himself authorised the withdrawal of the DCLI before they were overwhelmed. Any further attempt to take Hoven was impossible due to the waterlogged state of the country, which then had to be defended in conditions resembling the worst of the Western Front in the First World War. Horrocks organised an ad hoc battalion from XXX Corps' service units to relieve Wessex infantry for rest. Planning was under way to renew the offensive when the Germans attacked in the Ardennes (the Battle of the Bulge) on 16 December.

=== Operation Blackcock ===
The division then later played a comparatively small part in the mainly American Battle of the Bulge, where it was placed on the River Meuse as a reserve. Once the German Ardennes Offensive had been halted, 43rd (Wessex) Division returned to the offensive in early 1945 in Operation Blackcock to reduce the Roer Triangle, though exploitation was prevented by bad weather.

=== Operation Veritable ===
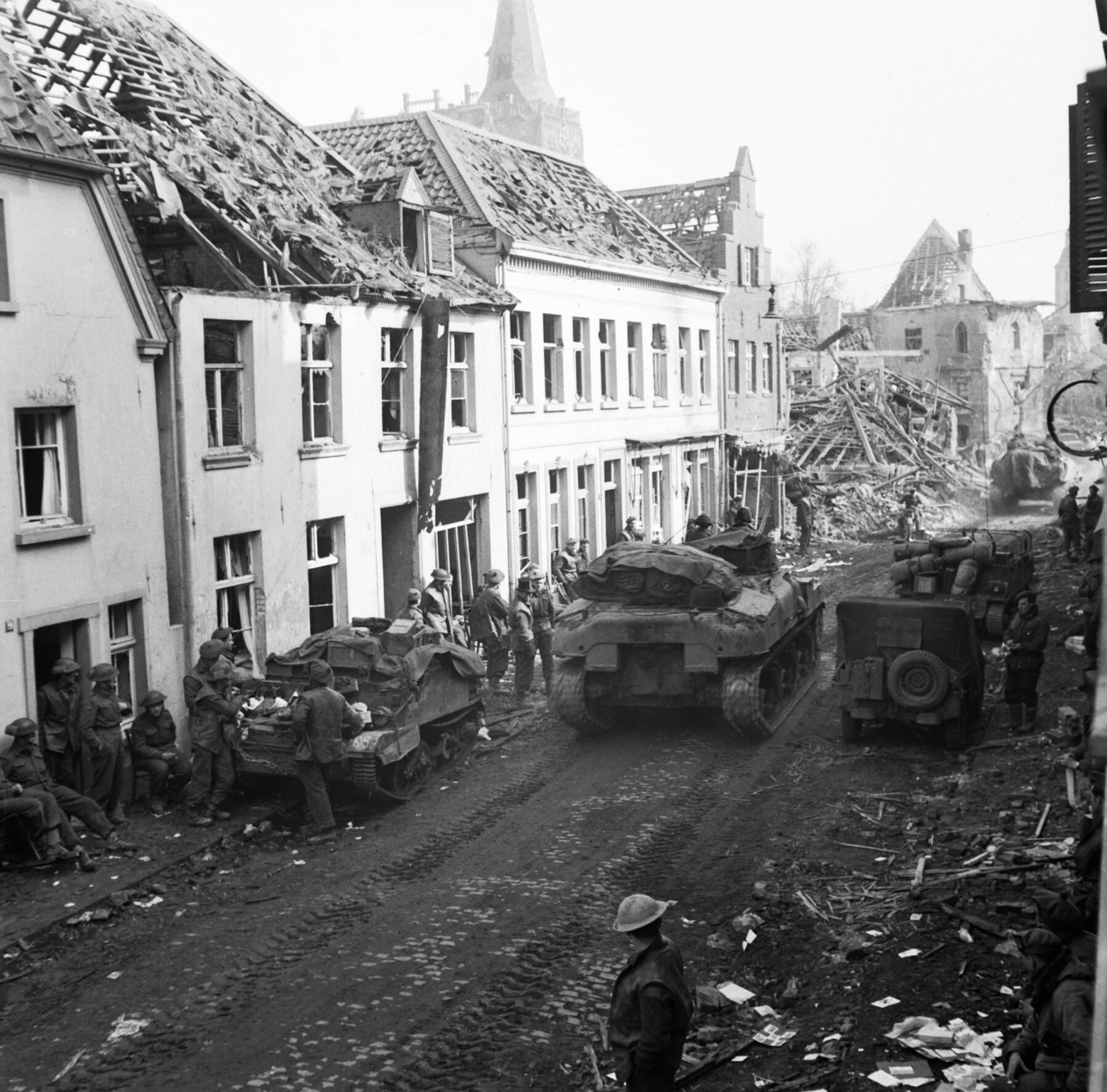
43rd (Wessex) Division passing through Xanten, 11 March 1945.

The 43rd later played a large part in Operation Veritable attached to First Canadian Army, through the month-long fighting in the Reichswald to capture Kleve, roll up the Siegfried Line defences, cross the Goch escarpment and seize Xanten on the Rhine.

=== Across the Rhine ===
43rd (Wessex) Division was given a follow-up task in the assault crossing of the Rhine (Operation Plunder). Its leading brigade crossed the river on 25 March behind 51st (Highland) Division, which had carried the assault on the night of 23/24 March. It found itself in immediate combat, but had broken through by 29 March. During the subsequent pursuit, 43rd (Wessex) Division was given the task of opening 'Club Route' for XXX Corps. The division was divided into five battle groups for the first 25 miles (40 km) drive, incorporating units of 8th Armoured Brigade. The advance began on 30 March: German rearguards were either overcome or bypassed, and the Twente Canal was crossed, with troops of 129th Infantry Bde and 8th Armoured Bde liberating Lochem on 1–2 April. The pursuit continued through April and ended with the capture of Bremen and XXX Corps' drive into the Cuxhaven peninsula. Hostilities ended on 5 May after the German surrender at Lüneburg Heath.

After a period as occupation forces in XXX Corps' district, 43rd (Wessex) Division's HQ and TA units were demobilised at the war's end. Throughout the North West Europe Campaign the 43rd (Wessex) Division, like so many other Allied divisions that fought from Normandy to Germany, had suffered very heavy casualties with the majority of them, 80% in some units, being suffered by the average Tommy in the infantry battalions. From June 1944 to May 1945 the 43rd (Wessex) Division, or the Yellow Devils or British SS Division as known by the Germans, had suffered well over 12,500 casualties, with almost 3,000 killed in action.

43rd (Wessex) Infantry Division Order of Battle 1939–1945

- 128th Infantry Brigade (left 6 June 1942)
  - 1/4th Battalion, Hampshire Regiment
  - 2/4th Battalion, Hampshire Regiment
  - 5th Battalion, Hampshire Regiment
  - 128th Infantry Brigade Anti-Tank Company (formed 19 June 1940, disbanded 20 December 1941)
- 129th Infantry Brigade
  - 4th Battalion, Somerset Light Infantry
  - 4th Battalion, Wiltshire Regiment
  - 5th Battalion, Wiltshire Regiment
  - 129th Infantry Brigade Anti-Tank Company (formed 14 May 1940, disbanded 20 December 1941)
- 130th Infantry Brigade
  - 7th Battalion, Hampshire Regiment
  - 4th Battalion, Dorsetshire Regiment
  - 5th Battalion, Dorsetshire Regiment
  - 130th Infantry Brigade Anti-Tank Company (formed 17 May 1940, disbanded 20 December 1941)
- 25th Tank Brigade (from 1 June 1942, left 2 September 1942)
  - 51st (Leeds Rifles) Royal Tank Regiment
  - 11th Royal Tank Regiment
  - 142nd Regiment Royal Armoured Corps
- 34th Tank Brigade (from 3 September 1942, left 10 September 1943)
  - North Irish Horse (left 3 September 1942)
  - 147th Regiment Royal Armoured Corps
  - 153rd Regiment Royal Armoured Corps
  - 151st Regiment Royal Armoured Corps (from 3 September 1942)
- 214th Infantry Brigade (from 5 September 1943)
  - 7th Battalion, Somerset Light Infantry
  - 5th Battalion, Duke of Cornwall's Light Infantry
  - 9th Battalion, Somerset Light Infantry (left 30 September 1943)
  - 1st Battalion, Worcestershire Regiment (from 30 September 1943)
- Divisional Troops
  - 1/8th Battalion, Middlesex Regiment (joined as Machine Gun Battalion from 18 November 1941, redesignated 8th Battalion May 1942, left 1 October 1942, rejoined as Support Battalion 1 October 1943, again as MG Battalion 28 February 1944)
  - 48th Battalion, Reconnaissance Corps (converted from 5th Battalion, Gloucestershire Regiment 20 November 1941, redesignated 43rd Battalion 1 January 1942, later 43rd Regiment 6 June 1942, finally 43rd (Wessex) Reconnaissance Regiment (The Gloucestershire Regiment), Royal Armoured Corps 1 January 1944)
- Royal Artillery
  - 94th (Queen's Own Dorset Yeomanry) Field Regiment, Royal Artillery
  - 112th (Wessex) Field Regiment, Royal Artillery
  - 141st (Queen's Own Dorset Yeomanry) Field Regiment, Royal Artillery (left 8 June 1942)
  - 179th Field Regiment, Royal Artillery (from 9 June 1942)
  - 59th (Duke of Connaught's Own) Anti-Tank Regiment, Royal Artillery
  - 110th Light Anti-Aircraft Regiment, Royal Artillery (converted from 7th Battalion, Dorsetshire Regiment, joined 23 March 1941)
- 43rd (Wessex) Divisional Engineers Royal Engineers
  - 204th (Wessex) Field Company, Royal Engineers
  - 260th Field Company, Royal Engineers
  - 553rd Field Company, Royal Engineers (from 13 January 1940)
  - 207th (Wessex) Field Park Company, Royal Engineers
  - 13th Bridging Platoon, Royal Engineers (from 1 October 1943)
  - 43 (Wessex) Division Postal Unit
- 43rd (Wessex) Divisional Signals, Royal Corps of Signals
- Royal Army Service Corps
  - 54, 504, 505, 506 Companies
  - 536 DUKW Company attached 16 September 1944
- Royal Army Medical Corps
  - 129, 130, 213 Field Ambulances
  - 14, 15, 38 Field Dressing Stations
  - 38 Field Hygiene Section
- Royal Army Ordnance Corps
  - 43 Ordnance Field Park
  - 306 Mobile Laundry and Bath Unit
- Royal Electrical and Mechanical Engineers
  - 129, 130, 214 Infantry Brigade Workshops
- 43 Wessex Division Provost Company, Royal Military Police
- 57 Field Security Section

== Postwar ==
The TA was reconstituted from 1 January 1947 and its units and formations including 43rd (Wessex) Infantry Division were reformed. (Note: Beckett claims that Territorial Army units that were in suspended animation were formally reactivated on 1 January 1947, though no personnel were assigned until commanding officers and permanent staff had been appointed in March and April 1947.) However, the TA saw large numbers of amalgamations from 1950 onwards. In 1961 the division became a district headquarters as 43rd (Wessex) Division/District, and it was disbanded on the reduction of the TA into the Territorial and Army Volunteer Reserve on 1 April 1967, when many individual TA units lost their identities. (Note: For example, the Royal Monmouthshire Royal Engineers absorbed 43rd (Wessex) Division/District RE.) The district headquarters itself formed the core of the structure for the creation of South West District under HQ UK Land Forces in 1972.

43rd (Wessex) Infantry Division Order of Battle 1947

- 128 Infantry Brigade
  - 4th Battalion, Royal Hampshire Regiment at Winchester
  - 4th Battalion, Oxfordshire and Buckinghamshire Light Infantry at Oxford
  - 4th/6th Battalion, Royal Berkshire Regiment at Reading
- 129 Infantry Brigade
  - 4th Battalion, Somerset Light Infantry at Bath
  - 5th Battalion, Gloucestershire Regiment at Gloucester
  - 4th Battalion, Wiltshire Regiment at Trowbridge
- 130 (West Country) Infantry Brigade
  - 4th Battalion, Devonshire Regiment at Exeter
  - 5th (Prince of Wales's) Battalion, Devonshire Regiment at Plymouth
  - 4th/5th Battalion, Duke of Cornwall's Light Infantry at Truro
  - 4th Battalion, Dorsetshire Regiment at Dorchester
- Royal Armoured Corps
  - Royal Wiltshire Yeomanry at Swindon
- Royal Artillery
  - 294 (Queen's Own Dorset Yeomanry) Field Regiment at Sherborne
  - 296 (Royal Devon Yeomanry) Field Regiment at Exeter
  - 387 (Queen's Own Oxfordshire Hussars) Field Regiment at Oxford
  - 383 (Duke of Connaught's Royal Hampshire) Anti-Tank Regiment at Portsmouth
  - 396 (Devon) Light Anti-Aircraft Regiment at Devonport
  - 883 Locating Battery at Bristol
- 110 Field Engineer Regiment Royal Engineers
  - 204 Field Squadron
  - 226 Field Squadron
  - 260 Field Squadron
  - 207 Field Park Squadron
- 43rd (Wessex) Infantry Division Signal Regiment at Taunton Royal Corps of Signals
  - 1 Squadron at Exeter
  - 2 Squadron at Taunton
  - 3 Squadron at Torquay, later Bristol
- 43 (Wessex) Infantry Divisional Column at Bristol Royal Army Service Corps
  - 504 Company at Swindon
  - 505 Company at Didcot
  - 506 Company at Plymouth
  - 1567 Company at Plymouth
- 43 Ordnance Field Park, Royal Army Ordnance Corps
- 43 Divisional Royal Electrical and Mechanical Engineers
- 43 Divisional Royal Army Medical Corps

In 1985 the division's memory was perpetuated when a new 43rd (Wessex) Brigade was formed as a National Defence Brigade HQ at Wyvern Barracks, Exeter, to command TA units in South West District. In 1998 it moved to Bulford Camp and undertook wider responsibilities. It was disbanded at Jellalabad Barracks, Tidworth, in December 2014 and merged into 1st Artillery Brigade and Headquarters South West.

== Commanders ==
The following officers commanded the division at various times:

Appointed	General officer commanding
April 1908	Brigadier-General William J. Kirkpatrick
January 1909	Major-General Charles J. Blomfield
February 1911	Major-General Colin G. Donald
June 1919	Major-General Sir Charles P. A. Hull
September 1920	Major-General Sir Louis J. Bols
September 1924	Major-General Sir Edward Northey
October 1926	Major-General Sir George D. Jeffreys
October 1930	Lieutenant-General Reginald J. T. Hildyard
October 1934	Major-General Baptist B. Crozier
December 1938	Major-General Arthur Floyer-Acland
February 1940	Major-General Arthur Percival
April 1940	Major-General Robert Pollok
February 1941	Major-General Charles Allfrey
March 1942	Major-General Ivor Thomas
September 1945	Major-General George W.E.J. Erskine
March 1946	Major-General John B. Churcher
1 January 1947	Major-General George W. Symes
January 1949	Major-General C.F. Charles Coleman
September 1951	Major-General Cecil L. Firbank
September 1954	Major-General Eric K.G. Sixsmith
October 1957	Major-General Hugh A. Borradaile
February 1960	Major-General John H. Cubbon
February 1963	Major-General John R. Holden
December 1964	Major-General Michael C.K. Halford

== Insignia ==
The banner of the kings of Wessex bore a golden Wyvern, a dragon with two eagle-like legs and the barbed tail of a snake. The 43rd (Wessex) Division adopted the golden wyvern on a blue square as its formation sign in 1935.

== Memorials ==
The Hill 112 memorial was erected by the divisional engineers and later taken over by the Commonwealth War Graves Commission with an endowment from the Memorial Fund. The first memorial in England was at Castle Hill, Mere, in Wiltshire, acquired on a 199-year lease from the Duchy of Cornwall and entrusted to the Parish Council of Mere. Next the fund acquired Wynyard's Gap near Crewkerne, Somerset. Finally, Sir Richard Onslow (formerly of the Duke of Cornwall's Light Infantry) presented Rough Tor on Bodmin Moor to the National Trust as a memorial. The Roll of Honour is in the War Memorial Chapel in Salisbury Cathedral.

A memorial stone stands at the end of a lane named 'Somerset' in Lochem, Netherlands, showing the Wessex Wyvern and listing 4th Bn Somerset Light Infantry, 4th Bn Wiltshire Regiment and units of 8th Armoured Bde who liberated Lochem on 1–2 April 1945. The horizontal inscription reads 'All the way from Normandy'.

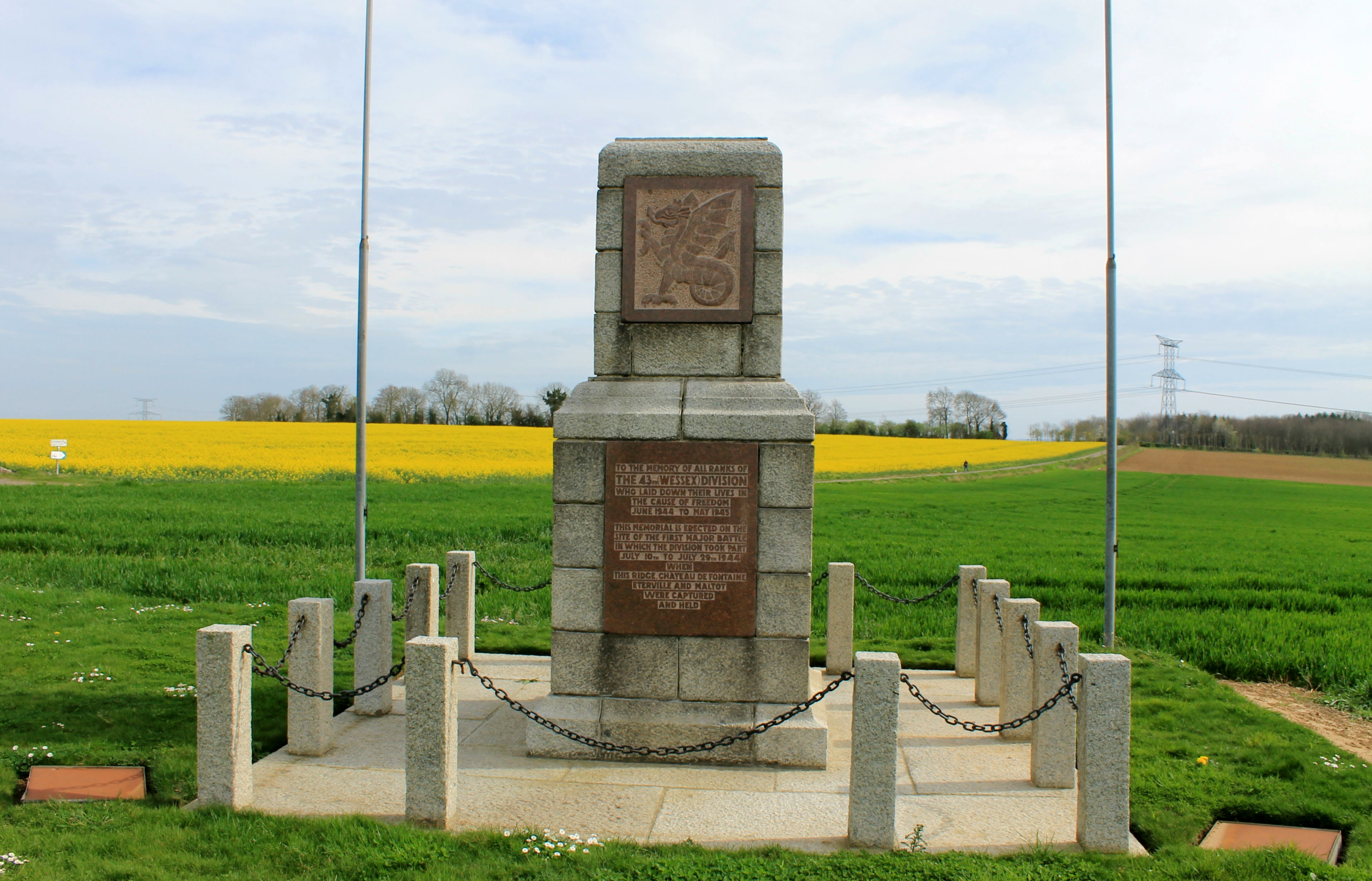
43rd (Wessex) Division memorial on Hill 112

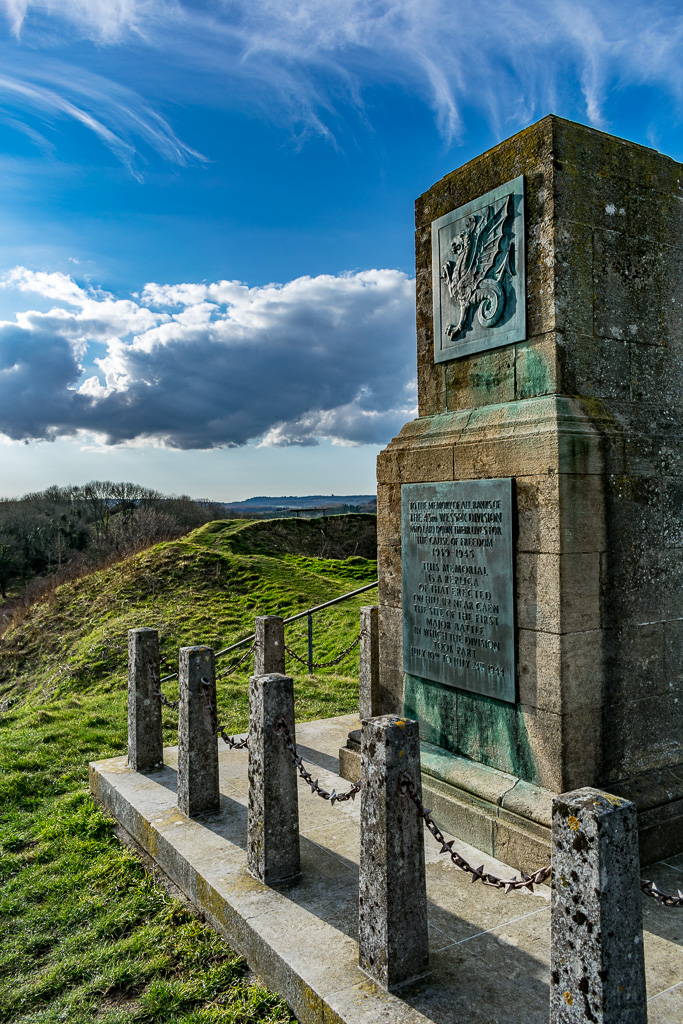
43rd (Wessex) Division memorial at Castle Hill, Mere

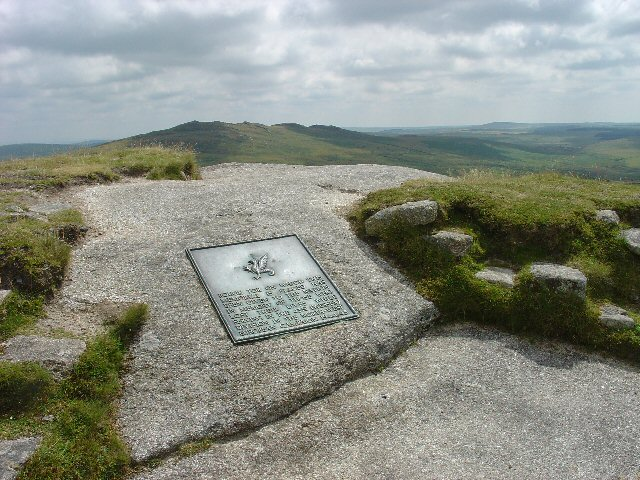
43rd Division memorial at the summit of Rough Tor, Bodmin Moor

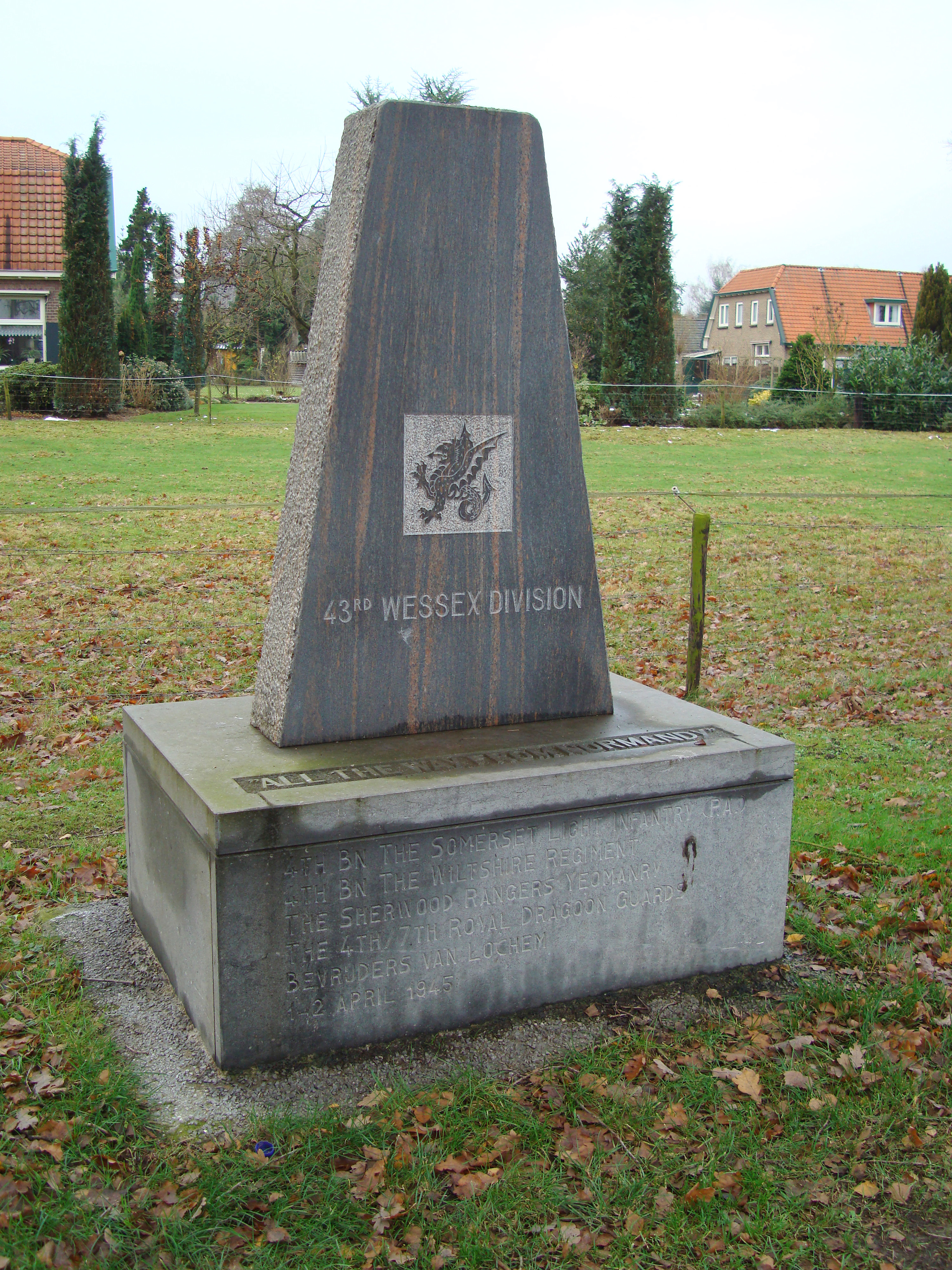
Liberation memorial at Lochem, Netherlands

== See also ==
- List of British divisions in World War I
- List of British divisions in World War II
- British Army Order of Battle (September 1939)

== Bibliography ==
- Becke, Maj A.F. History of the Great War: Order of Battle of Divisions, Part 2a: The Territorial Force Mounted Divisions and the 1st-Line Territorial Force Divisions (42–56), London: HM Stationery Office, 1935/Uckfield: Naval & Military Press, 2007, ISBN 1-847347-39-8.
- Beckett, Ian F.W. (2008) Territorials: A Century of Service, First Published by DRA Printing of 14 Mary Seacole Road, The Millfields, Plymouth PL1 3JY on behalf of TA 100, ISBN 978-0-9557813-1-5, 175, 180.
- Buckley, John (2013) Monty's Men: The British Army and the Liberation of Europe, London: Yale University Press, ISBN 978-0-300-13449-0.
- Christopherson, Stanley (James Holland, ed.), (2014) An Englishman at War: The Wartime Diaries of Stanley Christopherson, DSO, MC, TD, London: Bantam, ISBN 978-0593068373.
- Collier, Basil (1957), History of the Second World War, United Kingdom Military Series: The Defence of the United Kingdom, London: HM Stationery Office.
- Ellis, Major L.F., History of the Second World War, United Kingdom Military Series: Victory in the West, Vol I: The Battle of Normandy, London: HM Stationery Office, 1962/Uckfield: Naval & Military, 2004, ISBN 1-845740-58-0.
- Ellis, Major L.F. History of the Second World War, United Kingdom Military Series: Victory in the West, Vol II: The Defeat of Germany, London: HM Stationery Office, 1968/Uckfield: Naval & Military, 2004, ISBN 1-845740-59-9.
- Essame, Major-General H., (1952) The 43rd Wessex Division at War 1944–45, London: William Clowes.
- Ford, Ken, (2011) Assault Crossing: The River Seine 1944, 2nd Edn, Bradford: Pen & Sword, ISBN 978-1-84884-576-3
- Forty, George, (1998) British Army Handbook 1939–1945, Stroud: Sutton, ISBN 0-7509-1403-3.
- Horrocks, Lt-Gen Sir Brian, (1960) A Full Life, London: Collins.
- Hunt, Eric (2003) Battleground Europe: Normandy: Mont Pinçon, Barnsley: Leo Cooper, ISBN 0-85052-944-1.
- Joslen, H. F. (2003) [1960]. Orders of Battle: Second World War, 1939–1945. Uckfield, East Sussex: Naval and Military Press. ISBN 978-1-84342-474-1.
- Litchfield, Norman E.H. (1992) The Territorial Artillery 1908–1988 (Their Lineage, Uniforms and Badges), Nottingham: Sherwood Press, ISBN 0-9508205-2-0.
- Lord, Cliff; Watson, Graham, (2003) Royal Corps of Signals: Unit Histories of the Corps (1920–2001) and its Antecedents, Solihull: Helion, ISBN 1-874622-92-2.
- McKee, Alexander (1966) Caen: Anvil of Victory, London: Souvenir Press, 1964/Pan, ISBN 0-330-23368-8.
- Nalder, Maj-Gen R.F.H. (1958) The Royal Corps of Signals: A History of its Antecedents and Developments (Circa 1800–1955), London: Royal Signals Institution.
- Pakenham-Walsh, Major-General R.P., (1958) History of the Corps of Royal Engineers, Vol IX, 1938–1948, Chatham: Institution of Royal Engineers.
- Ryan, Cornelius A Bridge Too Far, London: Hamish Hamilton, 1974/Coronet 1975, ISBN 0-340-19941-5.
- Saunders, Tim (2003) Battleground Europe: Normandy: Operation Epsom: Normandy, June 1944, Barnsley: Pen & Sword Books, ISBN 0-85052-954-9.
- Saunders, Tim (2000) Battleground Europe: Normandy: Hill 112, Battles of the Odon – 1944, Barnsley: Pen & Sword Books, ISBN 978-0-85052-737-7.
- Watson, Graham E.; Rinaldi, Richard A. (2018) The Corps of Royal Engineers: Organization and Units 1889–2018, Tiger Lily Books, ISBN 978-171790180-4.
- Westlake, Ray (1992). British Territorial Units 1914–18. Men-at-Arms Series. Vol. 245. Osprey. ISBN 978-1-85532-168-7.
- Young, Lt-Col Michael (2000) Army Service Corps 1902–1918, Barnsley: Leo Cooper, ISBN 0-85052-730-9.
