= Charles Coleman (British Army officer) =

British Army general (1903–1974)

Lieutenant-General Sir Charles Coleman KCB CMG DSO OBE

General Officer Commanding-in-Chief, Eastern Command
- In office 1956–1959

Chief of Staff, Northern Army Group
- In office 1954–1956

Commandant, British Sector, Berlin
- In office 1951–1954

General Officer Commanding, South Western District/43rd (Wessex) Infantry Division
- In office 1949–1951

Commander, 160th Infantry Brigade
- In office 1947–1948

Commander, 160th Infantry Brigade
- In office June 1944 – 1946

Personal details
- Born: Cyril Frederick Charles Coleman; 16 April 1903 Stonehouse, Plymouth, Devon, England
- Died: 17 June 1974 (aged 71) Cambridge Military Hospital, Aldershot, Hampshire, England
- Awards: Knight Commander of the Order of the Bath; Companion of the Order of St Michael and St George; Distinguished Service Order; Officer of the Order of the British Empire; Knight 4th Class of the Military Order of William (Netherlands)

Military service
- Allegiance: United Kingdom
- Branch/service: British Army
- Years of service: 1923–1959
- Rank: Lieutenant-General
- Unit: Welch Regiment
- Commands: Eastern Command; British Forces in Berlin; 43rd (Wessex) Infantry Division; 160th Infantry Brigade; 4th Battalion, Welch Regiment
- Battles/wars: Second World War

Lieutenant-General Sir Cyril Frederick Charles Coleman, KCB, CMG, DSO, OBE (16 April 1903 – 17 June 1974) was a senior British Army officer.

== Early life ==
Charles Coleman was born in Stonehouse, Plymouth, Devon, in 1903, the son of Albert Edward Coleman of Downderry, Cornwall, and Adelaide Maxwell Moore, of Seaforth, Lancashire. He was educated at Plymouth College and at the Royal Military College, Sandhurst, and was commissioned as a second lieutenant into the Welch Regiment in 1923.

== Military career ==
Coleman served with his regiment in China, Malaya and India during the interwar period. On 30 August 1925 he was promoted to lieutenant. He was appointed adjutant of the 2nd Battalion of his regiment from 1932 to 1935.

During the Second World War, Coleman commanded the 4th Battalion, Welch Regiment from 1941 to 1944 and took over as acting commander of the 160th Infantry Brigade, his battalion's parent formation, in late 1943, before Brigadier Lashmer Whistler arrived in January 1944 to take command, with Coleman returning to commanding the 4th Welch. In June 1944 Coleman succeeded Whistler, who had been reassigned to command the 3rd Division, in command of the brigade, leading it throughout the campaign in North-West Europe from Normandy very nearly to the borders of Denmark by way of Falaise, Antwerp, Nijmegen, 's-Hertogenbosch, Wessem, the Ardennes, the Reichswald, the Rhine, the Weser, and Hamburg. He was awarded the Distinguished Service Order (DSO) in 1945 and the Dutch Knight 4th Class of the Military Order of William in 1947. As his brigade major wrote after his death, the respect the men of the brigade had for him "probably gave him as much pleasure and satisfaction as any of his later achievements". Certainly he wrote very warmly of the achievements of the 53rd (Welsh) Infantry Division, of which his brigade formed a part, in his preface to the history of its part in the Second World War, published in 1955, and as its author makes clear, he made a considerable contribution to this account.

In 1945, Coleman briefly served as the acting General Officer Commanding (GOC) of the 53rd Division. In 1946 he attended the Staff College, Camberley before returning to command the 160th Brigade from 1947 to 1948. From 1949 to 1951 he was GOC South-Western District and 43rd (Wessex) Infantry Division. He was appointed a Companion of the Order of the Bath (CB) in 1950. He served as Commandant of the British Sector in Berlin from 1951 to 1954 and was appointed a Companion of the Order of St Michael and St George (CMG) in 1954. From 1954 until 1956 he served as Chief of Staff to the Northern Army Group (British Army of the Rhine). He was appointed a Knight Commander of the Order of the Bath (KCB) in 1957. His final appointment was as GOC-in-C Eastern Command from 1956 to 1959. He served as colonel of the Welch Regiment from 1958 to 1965.

Coleman retired from the army in 1959, but he was appointed to serve as the Lieutenant-Governor and Commander-in-Chief of Guernsey from 1964 to 1969.

Coleman played hockey for Wales and was a keen shot. He married Margaret Mary, daughter of Bruce Petrie of Singapore, in 1935. They had three daughters.

Coleman died on 17 June 1974 in the Cambridge Military Hospital, Aldershot and was buried at St Mary's Church, Bentworth. He was survived by his wife.

Military offices
Preceded by George Symes	GOC 43rd (Wessex) Infantry Division; 1949–1951	Succeeded by Cecil Firbank
Preceded by Lord Bourne	Commandant, British Sector in Berlin; 1951–1954	Succeeded by Sir William Oliver
Preceded by Sir Francis Festing	GOC-in-C Eastern Command; 1956–1959	Succeeded by Sir James Cassels
Honorary titles
Preceded by Cyril Lomax	Colonel of the Welch Regiment; 1958–1965	Succeeded by Frank Brooke
Government offices
Preceded by Sir Geoffrey Robson	Lieutenant Governor of Guernsey; 1964–1969	Succeeded by Sir Charles Mills
