= Michael Halford =

British Army general (1914–1999)

Major-General Michael Halford DSO OBE
- Born: 28 October 1914
- Died: 4 January 1999 (aged 84)
- Military career
- Allegiance: United Kingdom
- Branch: British Army
- Service years: 1934–1967
- Rank: Major-General
- Service number: 62867
- Unit: York and Lancaster Regiment
- Commands: Hallamshire Battalion; 147th Infantry Brigade; 43rd (Wessex) Division/District
- Conflicts: Second World War
- Awards: Distinguished Service Order; Officer of the Order of the British Empire

Major-General Michael Charles Kirkpatrick Halford, DSO, OBE (28 October 1914 – 4 January 1999) was a British Army officer.

== Military career ==
Halford was commissioned into the York and Lancaster Regiment on 30 August 1934. He served as commanding officer of the Hallamshire Battalion of the York and Lancaster Regiment during the Italian campaign of the Second World War for which he was appointed a Member of the Order of the British Empire and a Companion of the Distinguished Service Order.

After the war, he became commander of 147th Infantry Brigade in July 1960, chief of staff at Western Command in July 1963 and General Officer Commanding 43rd (Wessex) Division/District in December 1964 before retiring in February 1967.

He was advanced to Officer of the Order of the British Empire in the 1957 Birthday Honours and served as honorary colonel of the York and Lancaster Regiment from 1966 to 1979.

Military offices
Preceded by John Holden	GOC 43rd (Wessex) Division/District; 1964–1967	Succeeded by Thomas Acton (as GOC South West District)
