= Castle Hill, Mere =

Castle in England

Castle Hill
- Mere, Wiltshire, England
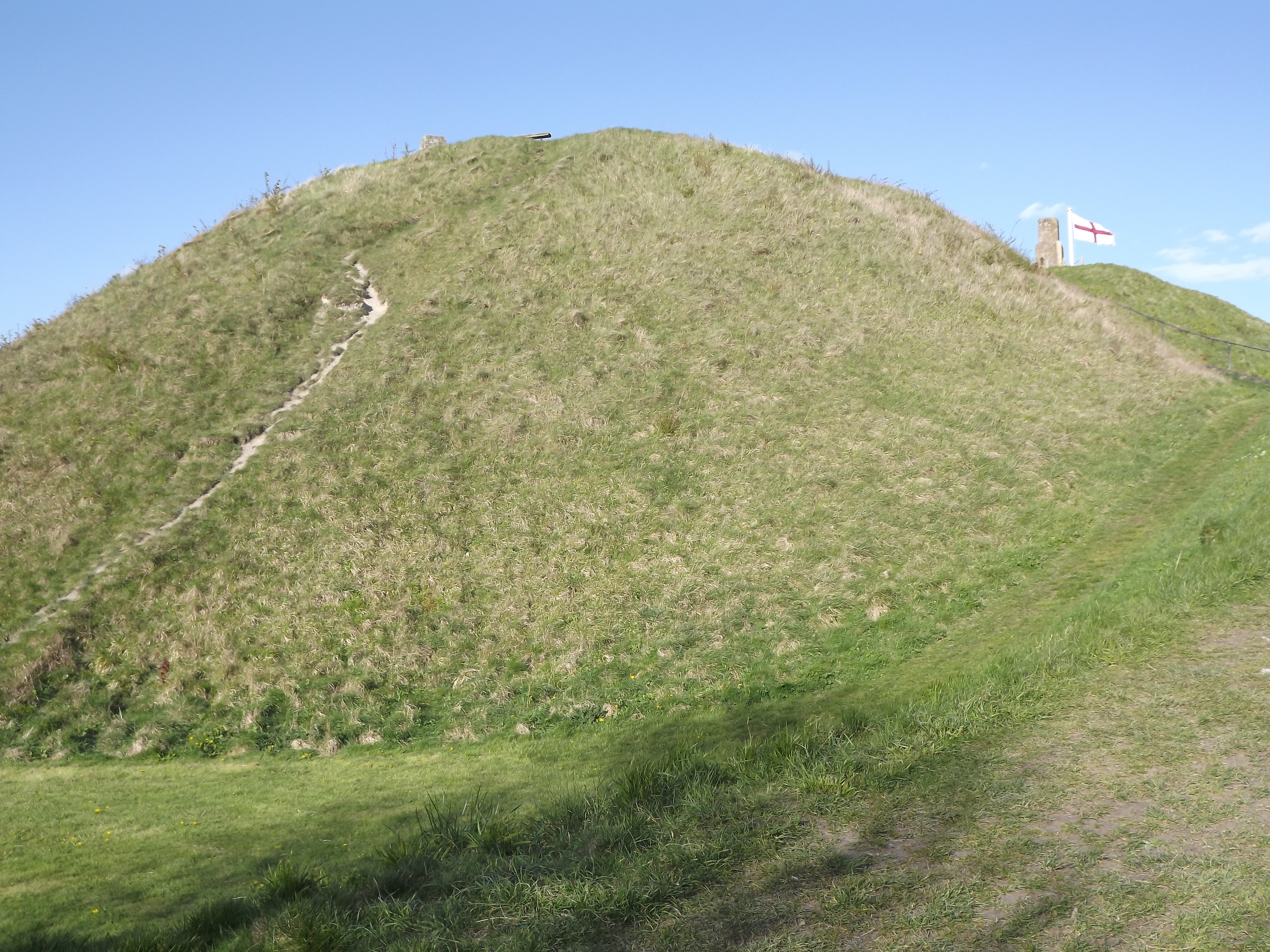
- Mere Castle

Site information
- Type: Enclosure
- Owner: Duchy of Cornwall
- Open to the public: Yes
- Condition: Only earthworks remain

Location
- Shown within Wiltshire
- Coordinates: 51.091°N 2.2728°W

Castle Hill, also called Mere Castle, was a medieval fortification built by Richard, the Earl of Cornwall, in 1253 on a hill overlooking the town of Mere, Wiltshire, England. The castle was constructed in stone, with six towers, inner buildings and gates. It was abandoned in the 14th century and stripped of its stone and metalwork. Only earthworks remain in the 21st century.

== History ==
=== Construction ===
The village of Mere was a small and unimportant settlement in the early 13th century. In 1243 Richard, the Earl of Cornwall, acquired the manor. Richard was the brother of Henry III and immensely rich. In 1253 he began to build a castle at Mere.

The castle was built on Long Hill, a chalk ridge overlooking the village; the hill was flattened and scarped, with a five-metre-deep (16 ft) ditch cut into the west side. As archaeologist Phil Mcmahon describes, documentary sources imply the castle was "a rectangular stone-built structure with six towers, incorporating a hall, an inner and outer gate, a deep well and a chapel", and it may have resembled a smaller version of Framlingham Castle. The castle was probably entered from the west, with a possible road running up the south side of the hill. At the same time the village was expanded into a planned town with an unofficial market. The castle was renovated in 1300, possibly in response to the threat of rebellion in England at the time.

=== Decline ===
Richard's son Edmund inherited the property, but on his death it was taken back by the Crown. Edward II gave it to his royal favourite, Piers Gaveston, whom he made Earl of Cornwall. Edward II and Gaveston fell from power in 1327 and John, Edward's second son, took possession as the new Earl of Cornwall. Edward III then reacquired the castle, which became a permanent part of the Duchy of Cornwall.

During the 14th century, however, the castle had declined and became abandoned. In 1398 Richard II had the lead taken from the castle roofs for reuse at Portchester Castle. In 1660, visitors' accounts imply that the stonework had all been dismantled, and 18th-century accounts suggest that this was reused for construction work in the town below, which had prospered from the wool and later linen trade.

=== 21st century ===
In the 21st century the site is protected under law as a scheduled monument. It is owned by the Duchy of Cornwall, and leased to the local parish council. A flagpole (which was previously illuminated at night) and a memorial to the 43rd (Wessex) Infantry Division are located on the castle site. A ceremony is held at the castle site each Easter.

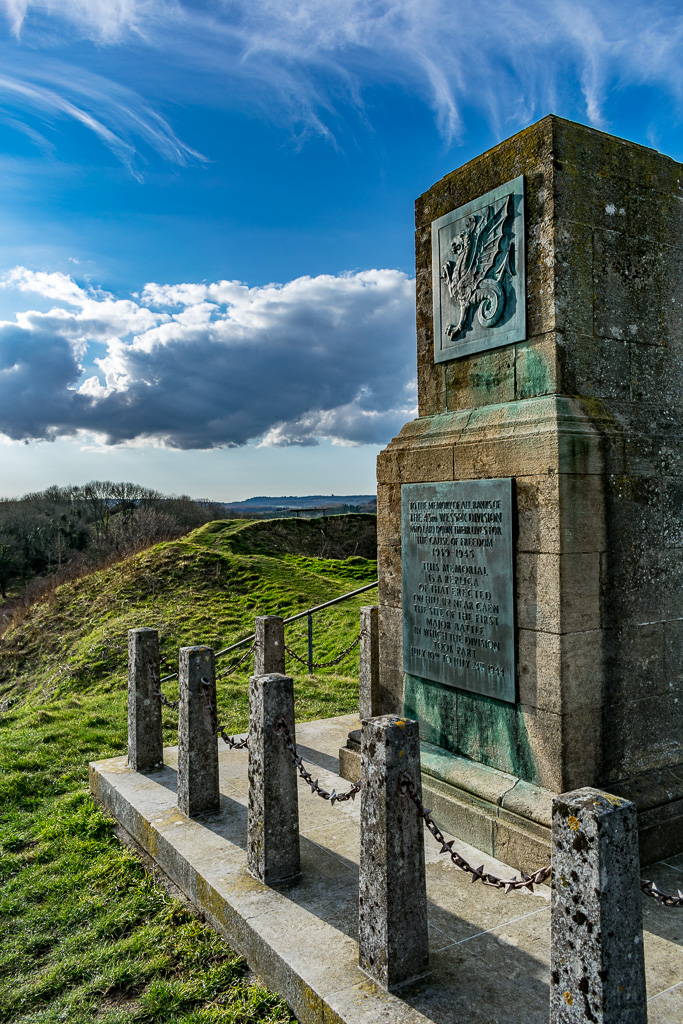
Memorial to the 43rd (Wessex) Infantry Division

== Archaeological investigation ==
Archaeological excavations of the site were carried out in 1887 by T. H. Baker and C. N. Wyld, but most of the results of their work were subsequently lost.

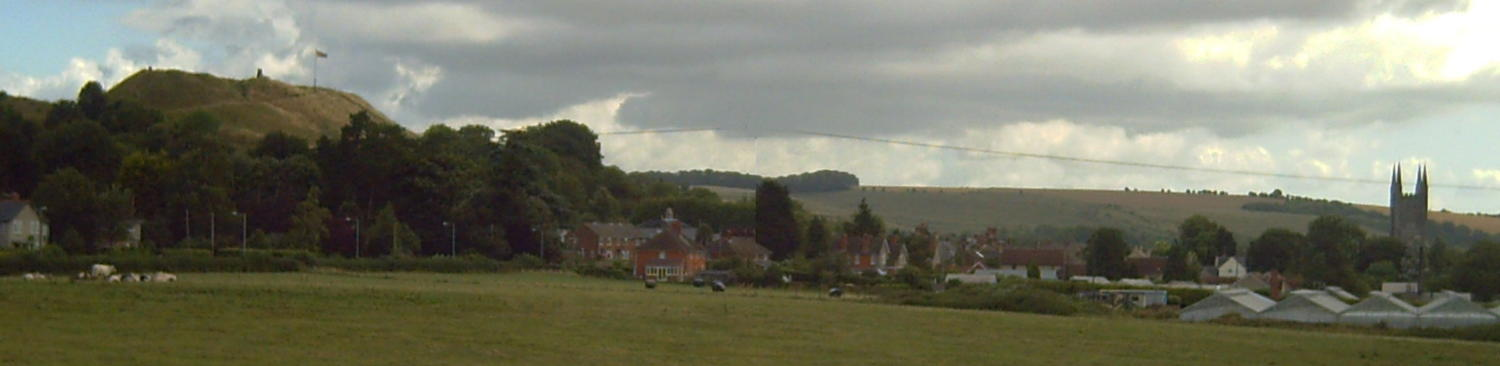
Mere Castle (l) overlooking the town of Mere (r)

== See also ==
- Castles in Great Britain and Ireland
- List of castles in England
