= MV Derrycunihy (1943) =

British military transport ship lost in 1944 Normandy landings

History
- Name: Derrycunihy
- Owner: McCowan & Gross Ltd
- Operator: Ministry of War Transport
- Port of registry: (United Kingdom) London
- Builder: Burntisland Shipbuilding Company
- Yard number: 275
- Laid down: 22 June 1943
- Launched: 11 November 1943
- Completed: 26 February 1944
- Identification: MTS T72
- Fate: Sunk off Normandy by enemy action 24 June 1944

General characteristics
- Tonnage: 10,200

MV Derrycunihy (MTS T72) was a British cargo ship impressed as a military transport during the Second World War. She was sunk off the Normandy beaches with great loss of life in 1944.

== Construction ==
Derrycunihy was a general-purpose cargo ship of 10,200 tons built (yard number 275) by Burntisland Shipbuilding Company for McGowan & Gross of London. Because of critical shipping requirements during the Second World War she had been built at great speed: her keel was laid on 22 June 1943, she was launched on 11 November the same year, and was delivered on 26 February 1944. She immediately came under the overall control of the Ministry of War Transport as Motor Transport Ship (MTS) T72, and guns were fitted fore and aft (manned by Royal Navy gunners).

== Disaster off Normandy ==
Shortly after D-Day the ship was selected to transport one of the regiments required for the build-up of troops in the Normandy bridgehead. On 18 June 1944 HQ, A and C squadrons of the 43rd (Wessex) Reconnaissance Regiment ("43 Recce") embarked at West India Docks, London, aboard the Derrycunihy. She joined a convoy off Southend-on-Sea, and arrived off the British landing area Sword on the evening of 20 June. High seas and enemy shelling prevented unloading for three days and it was decided to move T72 to Juno Beach for disembarkation. As the ship started engines at 07.40 on the morning of 24 June it detonated an acoustic or "Oyster" mine dropped by one of the nightly Luftwaffe raiders. The mine exploded under the keel, splitting the ship in two, and the after part, packed with sleeping men of 43 Recce, sank rapidly. Worse still, a 3-tonner ammunition lorry caught fire, and oil floating on the water was set alight. Landing craft and the gunboat HMS Locust quickly came alongside and picked up survivors, most of whom were evacuated to SS Cap Touraine, a former French liner.

When all the survivors had been taken off, Captain Richardson of the Derrycunihy and the commanding officer of 43 Recce, Lieutenant-colonel Francis Lane Fox, argued over who should be last to leave the half-sunken ship.

The Regimental War Diary records that "Great gallantry was displayed by all troops in the two aft holds" and lists 183 men of the regiment lost and about 120 others evacuated wounded. In addition, 25 of the ship's crew, (including Army gunners and a Royal Observer Corps Seaborne Observer), died in the disaster, which represented the biggest single loss of life off the Normandy invasion beaches.

== Aftermath ==
In the days following the sinking, most of 43 Recce's vehicles were landed from the beached fore part of the Derrycunihy, and reinforcements were sent from England, but 43 Recce was not fully up to strength until the end of July 1944 and was unable to assist its parent division in the bitter Battle for Caen.

The sunken after-part of the Derrycunihy remains as a wreck site off Sword. Another ship built at Burntisland for the Ministry of War Transport, the Empire Calshot (1945) was bought by McGowan & Gross after the war and renamed Derrycunihy.
