= John Cubbon =

British Army general

Major-General John Cubbon CB CBE
- Born: 1911
- Died: 1997 (aged 85−86)
- Military career
- Allegiance: United Kingdom
- Branch: British Army
- Service years: 1931–1965
- Rank: Major-General
- Service number: 52600
- Commands: 2/5th Battalion, Royal Leicestershire Regiment; 6th (Royal Welch) Parachute Battalion; 1st Battalion, Parachute Regiment; 18th Infantry Brigade; 43rd (Wessex) Infantry Division; Middle East Land Forces
- Conflicts: Second World War; Malayan Emergency; Aden Emergency
- Awards: Companion of the Order of the Bath; Commander of the Order of the British Empire

Major-General John Hamilton Cubbon, CB, CBE (1911–1997) was a British Army officer.

== Military career ==
Cubbon was commissioned into the Cheshire Regiment in 1931. He served as adjutant of the 7th Battalion, the Cheshire Regiment with the British Expeditionary Force in September 1939 at the start of the Second World War. He then commanded the 2/5th Battalion the Leicestershire Regiment from October 1944 to April 1945 during the Italian campaign.

After the war, in 1946, he became commanding officer of 6th (Royal Welch) Parachute Battalion and, in 1948, he became commanding officer of 4/6th Parachute Battalion which was re-designated as the 1st Battalion, Parachute Regiment later that year. He went on to be commander of 18th Infantry Brigade in Malaya in 1956 during the Malayan Emergency, General Officer Commanding 43rd (Wessex) Infantry Division in February 1960 and General Officer Commanding Middle East Land Forces in Aden in May 1963 during the Aden Emergency before retiring in June 1965.

He was appointed a Companion of the Order of the Bath in the 1962 Birthday Honours.

Military offices
Preceded by Hugh Borradaile	GOC 43rd (Wessex) Infantry Division; 1960–1963	Succeeded by John Holden
