= 214th Infantry Brigade (United Kingdom) =

214th Independent Infantry Brigade (Home) 214th Independent Infantry Brigade 214th Infantry Brigade
- Formation sign used by the 214th Independent Infantry Brigade.
- Country: United Kingdom
- Branch: British Army
- Type: Infantry
- Size: Brigade
- Part of: 43rd (Wessex) Infantry Division
- Engagements: The Odon; Caen; Bourguebus Ridge; Mont Pinçon; The Nedderrijn; The Rhineland; The Rhine

Commanders
- Notable commanders: Hubert Essame; Richard Goodwin

Insignia
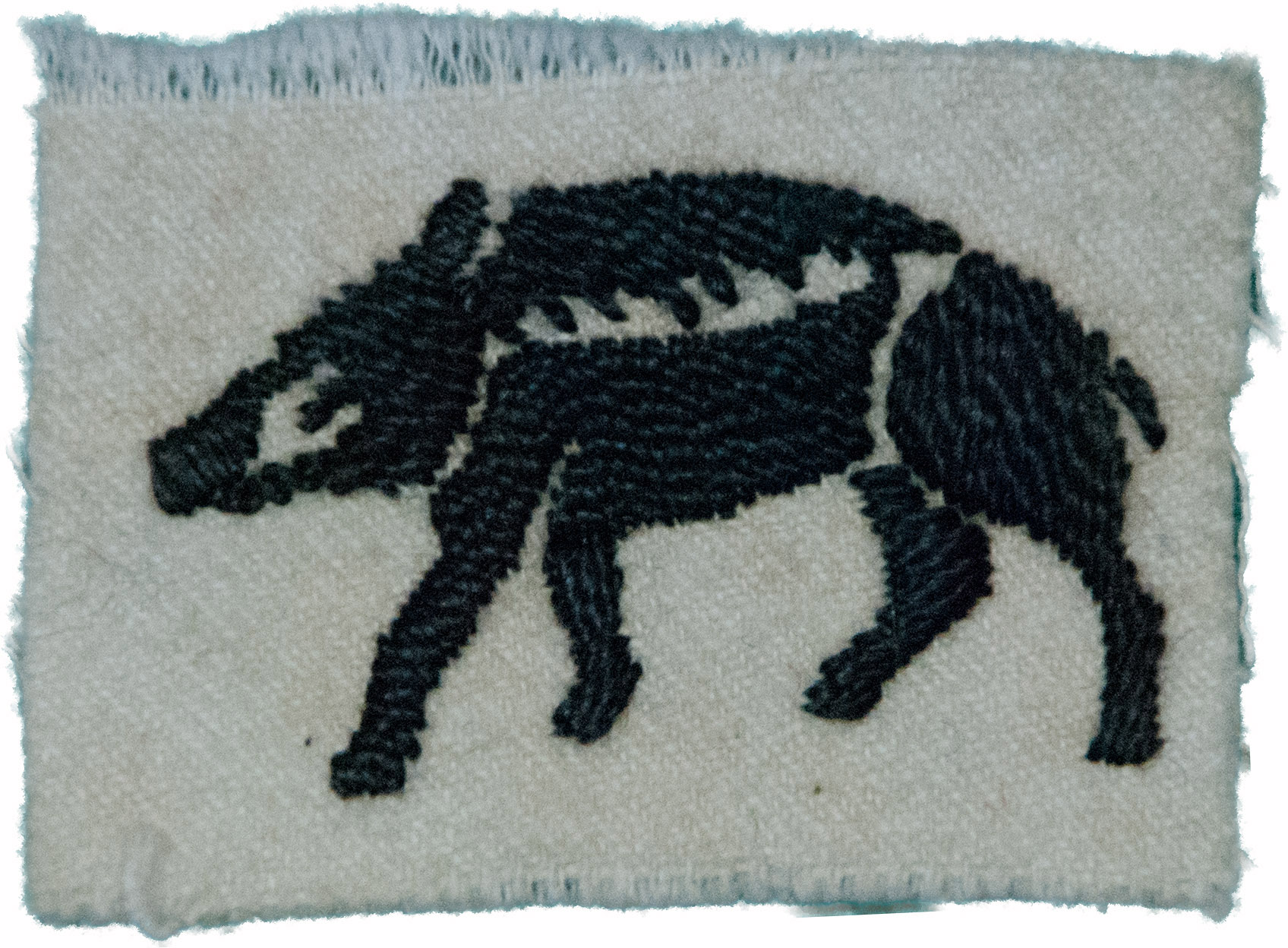
- Formation sign worn when in the Hampshire County Division.

- Formation sign worn when in the 43rd (Wessex) Infantry Division.

The 214th Infantry Brigade was an infantry brigade of the British Army raised during the Second World War that saw active service on the North West Europe.

== History ==
=== Formation ===
The brigade was formed for service in the United Kingdom on 11 October 1940, when the No 14 Infantry Training Group was redesignated as the 214th Independent Infantry Brigade (Home). It was initially composed of newly raised battalions. On 1 December 1941, it was redesigned as the 214th Independent Infantry Brigade.

=== Service ===
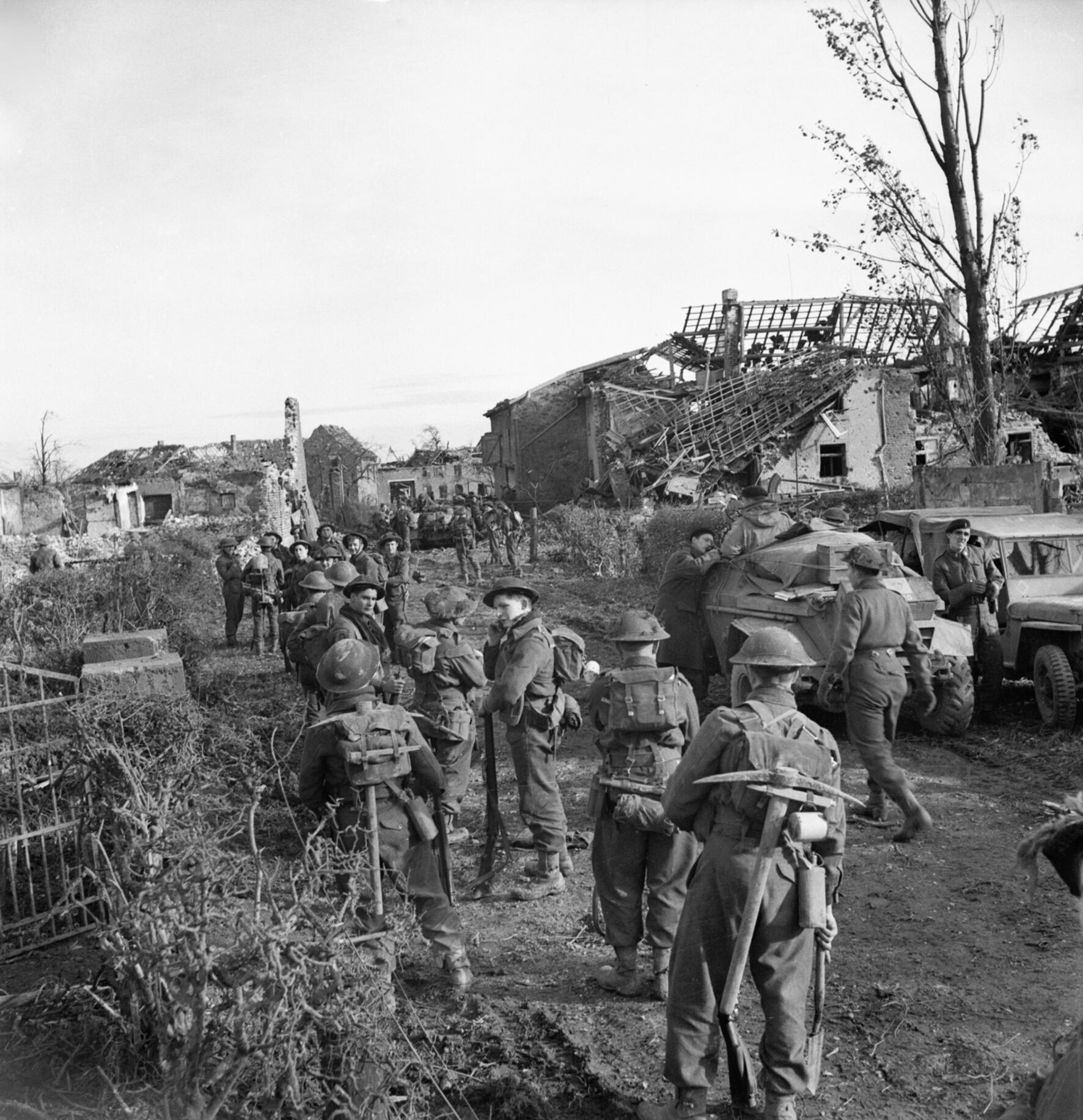
Men of the 7th Battalion, Somerset Light Infantry resting during the assault on Geilenkirchen in Germany, 18 November 1944.

On 5 September 1943, the brigade joined the 43rd (Wessex) Infantry Division, replacing the 34th Tank Brigade, and along with the 129th Infantry Brigade and 130th Infantry Brigade reformed the 43rd Division as a standard infantry division, after an experiment as Mixed (infantry and tank) division was abandoned. The brigade landed in Normandy on 24 June 1944, under the command of Brigadier Hubert Essame, and fought during Operation Overlord, It fought against the German 9th SS Panzer Division Hohenstaufen at Hill 112, in July 1944, during the Battle for Caen.

The 214th Brigade, along with the rest of the 43rd Division, were the first British units to cross the River Seine, with an assault crossing at the French town of Vernon opposed by the 49th Infantry Division. This enabled the armour of XXX Corps to thrust across northern France and into Belgium. The brigade was later involved in Operation Market Garden, and supported the Guards Armoured Division. The brigade was later placed along the Meuse as a reserve, during the Battle of the Bulge. It then went on to be engaged in the fighting in the Klever Reichswald (Operation Veritable) and the crossing of the Rhine (Operation Plunder). By the end of hostilities they had reached the Cuxhaven peninsula of northern Germany.

== Order of battle ==
The 214th Brigade had the following composition:

- As part of Area Commands and the Hampshire County Division.
  - 19th Battalion, Royal Fusiliers (11 October 1940 — 30 November 1941)
  - 20th Battalion, Royal Fusiliers (11 October 1940 — 30 November 1941)
  - 21st Battalion, Royal Fusiliers (11 October 1940 — 15 July 1941)
  - 6th Battalion, Oxfordshire and Buckinghamshire Light Infantry (11 October 1940 — 26 November 1941)
  - 11th Battalion, West Yorkshire Regiment (15 July — 25 November 1941)
  - 11th Battalion, Hampshire Regiment (13 November 1941 — 30 November 1941)
  - 12th Battalion, Hampshire Regiment (25 November 1941 — 30 November 1941)
- As part of the 214th Independent Infantry Brigade under various commands
  - 19th Battalion, Royal Fusiliers (1 December 1941 — 1 January 1942, converted to the 98th Anti-Tank Regiment, Royal Artillery)
  - 20th Battalion, Royal Fusiliers (1 December 1941 — 1 January 1942)
  - 11th Battalion, Hampshire Regiment (1 December 1941 — 8 September 1942)
  - 12th Battalion, Hampshire Regiment (1 December 1941 — 5 September 1942)
  - 7th Battalion, Wiltshire Regiment (30 November 1941 — 11 September 1942)
  - 5th Battalion, Duke of Cornwall's Light Infantry (6 September 1942 — 5 September 1943)
  - 7th Battalion, Somerset Light Infantry (12 September 1942 — 5 September 1943)
  - 9th Battalion, Somerset Light Infantry (2 June 1942 — 5 September 1943)
  - 12th Battalion, Devonshire Regiment (7 — 25 June 1943)
- As part of 43rd (Wessex) Infantry Division
  - 5th Battalion, Duke of Cornwall's Light Infantry (from 6 September 1943)
  - 7th Battalion, Somerset Light Infantry (from 6 September 1943)
  - 9th Battalion, Somerset Light Infantry (6 — 30 September 1943)
  - 1st Battalion, Worcestershire Regiment (from 30 September 1943)

== Commanders ==
The 214th Brigade had the following commanders:

- Brigadier J.M. Prower (from 11 October 1940)
- Brigadier J.O. Carpenter (from 25 February 1941)
- Brigadier H. Essame (from 15 September 1942)
- Lieutenant-Colonel G. Taylor (acting) (from 16 June 1945)
- Brigadier R.E. Goodwin (from 22 June 1945)
