= Cecil Firbank =

British Army general (1903–1985)

Major-General Cecil Firbank CB CBE DSO* DL
- Born: 1903
- Died: 1985 (aged 81−82)
- Military career
- Allegiance: United Kingdom
- Branch: British Army
- Service years: 1924−1958
- Rank: Major-General
- Service number: 28072
- Unit: Somerset Light Infantry
- Commands: 2nd Battalion, Lincolnshire Regiment; 71st Infantry Brigade; School of Infantry; 43rd (Wessex) Infantry Division
- Conflicts: Second World War
- Awards: Companion of the Order of the Bath; Commander of the Order of the British Empire; Distinguished Service Order & Bar

Major-General Cecil Llewellyn Firbank, CB, CBE, DSO & Bar, DL (1903–1985) was a British Army officer.

== Military career ==
Born in Oakhill, Mendip District, Somerset, Firbank entered the Royal Military College, Sandhurst, and was commissioned into the Somerset Light Infantry on 30 January 1924. Eric Bols and Robert King were among his fellow graduates, both also future major-generals.

During the Second World War, he commanded the 2nd Battalion, the Lincolnshire Regiment in North West Europe in 1944 and then commanded the 71st Infantry Brigade also in North West Europe from April 1945 during the Second World War for which he was appointed a Companion of the Distinguished Service Order & Bar.

After the war he became Commandant, School of Infantry in September 1948, General Officer Commanding 43rd (Wessex) Infantry Division in September 1951 and Director of Infantry in October 1955 before retiring in December 1958 .

He was appointed a Commander of the Order of the British Empire in the 1951 Birthday Honours and a Companion of the Order of the Bath in the 1953 Coronation Honours.

He was honorary colonel of the Somerset and Cornwall Light Infantry from 1963 to 1968.

Military offices
Preceded by Michael West	Commandant of the School of Infantry; 1948–1951	Succeeded by Richard Elton Goodwin
Preceded by Charles Coleman	GOC 43rd (Wessex) Infantry Division; 1951–1954	Succeeded by Eric Sixsmith
