= Eric Sixsmith =

British Army officer

Major-General Eric Sixsmith CB CBE
- Born: 15 October 1904; Cardiff
- Died: 6 April 1986 (aged 81); Yeovil
- Military career
- Allegiance: United Kingdom
- Branch: British Army
- Service years: 1924–1961
- Rank: Major-General
- Service number: 30697
- Unit: Cameronians (Scottish Rifles)
- Commands: 2nd Battalion, Royal Scots Fusiliers; 2nd Battalion, Cameronians (Scottish Rifles); 43rd (Wessex) Infantry Division
- Conflicts: Second World War
- Awards: Companion of the Order of the Bath; Commander of the Order of the British Empire

Major-General Eric Keir Gilborne Sixsmith, CB, CBE (15 October 1904 – 6 April 1986) was a British Army officer.

== Military career ==
Educated at Harrow School and the Royal Military College, Sandhurst, Sixsmith was commissioned into the Cameronians (Scottish Rifles) on 27 August 1924.

He commanded the 2nd Battalion, Royal Scots Fusiliers in Italy and then the 2nd Battalion, Cameronians (Scottish Rifles) in Italy and then became Deputy Director of Staff Duties at the War Office during the Second World War.

After the war he became Deputy Director of Personnel Administration at the War Office in January 1948, Chief of Staff and Deputy Commander, British Forces in Hong Kong in January 1952 and Chief of Staff for Far East Land Forces in April 1952. After that he became General Officer Commanding 43rd (Wessex) Infantry Division in September 1954 and Assistant Chief of Staff, Organization and Training at Supreme Headquarters Allied Powers Europe in November 1957 before retiring in January 1961.

He was appointed a Member of the Order of the British Empire in the 1941 Birthday Honours, advanced to Commander of the Order of the British Empire in 1946 Birthday Honours and appointed and a Companion of the Order of the Bath in the 1951 Birthday Honours.

== Works ==
- Sixsmith, Eric Keir Gilborne (1970). British Generalship in the Twentieth Century. Arms & Armour Press.
- Sixsmith, Major General E. K. G. (1973). Eisenhower as Military Commander. B. C. T. Batsford Limited. ISBN 978-0713412123.
- Sixsmith, Eric Keir Gilborne (1976). Douglas Haig. Weidenfeld and Nicolson.

Military offices
Preceded by Cecil Firbank	GOC 43rd (Wessex) Infantry Division; 1954–1957	Succeeded by Hugh Borradaile
