= Hubert Essame =

British Army officer and historian

Major-General Hubert Essame CBE DSO MC
- Born: 24 December 1896; St Thomas, Exeter, Devon, England
- Died: 2 March 1976 (aged 79); West Wittering, West Sussex, England
- Military career
- Allegiance: United Kingdom
- Branch: British Army
- Service years: 1915–1949
- Rank: Major-General
- Service number: 5114
- Unit: Northamptonshire Regiment
- Commands: 214th Infantry Brigade (1942–1945); 1st Battalion, East Lancashire Regiment (1941–1942)
- Conflicts: First World War; Second World War
- Awards: Commander of the Order of the British Empire; Distinguished Service Order; Military Cross; Mentioned in Despatches

Major-General Hubert Essame, CBE, DSO, MC (24 December 1896 – 2 March 1976) was a British Army officer who fought in the First and Second World Wars. He was also a military lecturer, historian and broadcaster.

== Military career ==
Born on 24 December 1896, Hubert Essame was the son of Ernest H. Essame of Wokingham. He was educated at Nottingham High School.

Essame joined the British Army during the First World War as a volunteer in 1915, and enlisted into the 2nd Battalion, Northamptonshire Regiment. He first saw active service on the Western Front in May 1916, and on 2 October he was commissioned as a second lieutenant into the Northamptonshire Regiment. He was wounded twice over the course of the war, mentioned in despatches in December 1917, and awarded the Military Cross (MC) in July 1918. The citation for the medal reads:

For conspicuous gallantry and devotion to duty during several days of rearguard actions. As Adjutant to the battalion, his personal courage and unflagging energy were a splendid example to all ranks. Although knocked over by a shell early in the operations, he overcame the shock by sheer will power, and continued his duties totally regardless of personal danger. His coolness and ability in the hazardous task of collecting information and keeping control of the situations as they arose, and the value of his services to his commanding officer cannot be estimated.

In November 1924, Essame was promoted to captain. Between 1926 and 1929 he served as adjutant in the Auxiliary Forces in India, before attending the Staff College, Quetta, from 1929 to 1930. In 1934 he served as a staff officer at the War Office and with various Territorial Army units.

In 1941, during the Second World War, Essame became commanding officer of the 1st Battalion, East Lancashire Regiment. Relinquishing command of the battalion, he was promoted to brigadier in September 1942 and became commander of the 214th Infantry Brigade, leading the brigade in fighting in northern Europe. He was awarded the Distinguished Service Order in October 1944. In June 1945, a month after the end of the war in Europe, he briefly served as General Officer Commanding (GOC) of the 43rd (Wessex) Infantry Division in place of the original GOC, Major General Ivor Thomas. Essame was appointed a Commander of the Order of the British Empire in October 1945.

Between 1946 and 1949, Essame was President of the Regular Commissions Board, before retiring from the army with the rank of major general on 24 June 1949.

== Other work ==
Following his retirement from the army, Essame worked as a military historian. He was a lecturer in military history at King's College London, and published several books and articles. He was an advisor to television producers for military programmes.

=== Publications ===
- The 43rd Wessex Division at War (1952)
- The North West Europe campaign, 1944–1945 (1962)
- The Battle for Normandy (1965)
- The Battle for Germany (1969)
- Normandy Bridgehead (1971)
- Battle for Europe, 1918 (1972)
- Patton the Commander (1974)
- Corps Commander (1977)
