= John Holden (British Army officer) =

British Army general (1913–1995)

Major-General John Holden CB CBE DSO
- Born: 1913
- Died: 1995 (aged 81–82)
- Military career
- Allegiance: United Kingdom
- Branch: British Army
- Rank: Major-General
- Service number: 71215
- Unit: Royal Tank Regiment
- Commands: 43rd (Wessex) Division/District
- Conflicts: Second World War
- Awards: Companion of the Order of the Bath; Commander of the Order of the British Empire; Distinguished Service Order

Major-General John Reid Holden, CB, CBE, DSO (1913–1995) was a British Army officer.

== Military career ==
Holden was commissioned into the Royal Tank Corps (later the Royal Tank Regiment) in January 1937. He saw action in the Middle East Campaign during the Second World War for which he was appointed a Companion of the Distinguished Service Order.

After the war he became Chief of British Mission to Soviet Forces in Europe in October 1961, Director of the Royal Armoured Corps in January 1965 and General Officer Commanding 43rd (Wessex) Division/District in February 1963 before retiring in December 1964.

He was appointed a Commander of the Order of the British Empire in the 1961 New Year Honours and a Companion of the Order of the Bath in the 1965 Birthday Honours.

Military offices
Preceded by John Cubbon	GOC 43rd (Wessex) Division/District; 1963–1964	Succeeded by Michael Halford
