= Hugh Borradaile =

British Army general (1907–1993)

Major-General Hugh Borradaile CB DSO
- Borradaile in 1960
- Born: 22 June 1907; Exeter, Devon, England
- Died: 13 December 1993 (aged 86); Langport, Somerset, England
- Military career
- Allegiance: United Kingdom
- Branch: British Army
- Service years: 1926–1963
- Rank: Major-General
- Service number: 38523
- Unit: Devonshire Regiment
- Commands: 5th Battalion, East Lancashire Regiment; 7th Battalion, Somerset Light Infantry; 1st Battalion, Devonshire Regiment; 24th Infantry Brigade; 43rd (Wessex) Infantry Division
- Conflicts: Second World War
- Awards: Companion of the Order of the Bath; Distinguished Service Order

Major-General Hugh Alastair Borradaile, CB, DSO (22 June 1907 – 13 December 1993) was a British Army officer.

== Military career ==
Borradaile was born on 22 June 1907. He was commissioned into the Devonshire Regiment on 30 August 1926. He commanded the 5th Battalion, the East Lancashire Regiment and then the 7th Battalion, the Somerset Light Infantry during the Normandy campaign in the Second World War.

After the war he became Assistant Chief of Staff, Allied Control Commission Germany in 1945, commanding officer of the 1st Battalion, the Devonshire Regiment in 1946 and Deputy Chief of Intelligence Division, Allied Control Commission Germany in 1948. He went on to become became Chief Administration Officer, Anti-Aircraft Command in October 1951, commander of 24th Infantry Brigade in September 1953 and Deputy Military Secretary at the War Office in July 1955. After that he became General Officer Commanding 43rd (Wessex) Infantry Division in October 1957 and Vice Adjutant-General at the War Office in February 1960 before retiring in March 1963.

He was appointed a Companion of the Order of the Bath in the 1959 Birthday Honours and was honorary colonel of the Devonshire and Dorset Regiment from 1962 to 1967.

In retirement he was Master of the Worshipful Company of Drapers from 1971 to 1972.

Military offices
Preceded by Eric Sixsmith	GOC 43rd (Wessex) Infantry Division; 1957–1960	Succeeded by John Cubbon
