= Acoustic mine =

Mine that monitors acoustic activity for potential targets

An acoustic mine is a type of naval mine which monitors audio activity in its vicinity. Depending on its design, it will either passively listen to its environment, depending only on the noise that is made by passing ships or actively send out audio pulses, not unlike a sonar, listening to the lapse in time in which the echo returns to it.

The mine may freely drift, be moored at a certain location and depth, or lie at the bottom of the ocean floor.

== Usage ==
The first acoustic mines were deployed by the German navy in the Thames Estuary in October 1940. These mines could be set to broad spectrum or narrow spectrum sound signature. The broad setting would be triggered by the sound of any passing ship's propeller; the narrow would be set to only explode when the propeller of a large ship was detected.

The US Navy deployed acoustic mines as an anti-submarine device from 1948.

== Mechanism ==
In naval warfare, an acoustic mine is defined as one being equipped with a hydrophone that functions as a listening device. This hydrophone listens for particular noises made by any ship or vessel's machinery (propellers). It can also detects structural sounds from the hull of a passing ship. An acoustic mine is mainly operated by a sensitive diaphragm located inside the hydrophone. This diaphragm is actuated when a certain noise reaches a predetermined intensity and duration. This initiates the closing of a switch causing an electrical circuit to flow and the mine to detonate.

== Counter measures ==
When first encountering this type of mine in the 1940s the British Royal Navy responded with a series of devices that produced loud noises underwater to trigger the mines . Experiments were conducted with jackhammers, sirens, handgrenades, and bundles of loose metal pipes. They eventually settled on the jackhammer (known as breakers in the UK). This was initially set up to hammer against a bulkhead of a minesweeper but this resulted in the mine exploding dangerously close to the vessel. The hammer was then located in a metal box that was extended over the bows of the ship so that its sound preceded the ship itself. Towing the hammer in a floating vessel off to the side of the ship was also used. An off the shelf electrically powered breaker called a Kango was used and the approach became known as the "Kango sweep".

== Bibliography ==
- Brown, David K. (2002). "Question 49/01". Warship International. XXXIX (4): 348–349. ISSN 0043-0374.
- Levie, Howard S. Mine Warfare at Sea. Norwell, MA. Kluwer Academic Publishers, 1992. ISBN 079231526X
