= 1st Somersetshire Engineers =

1st Somersetshire Engineer Volunteers 43rd (Wessex) Divisional Engineers 110 Engineer Regiment
- Active: 1868–1967
- Country: United Kingdom
- Branch: Territorial Army
- Role: Field Engineering
- Garrison/HQ: Nailsea; Weston-super-Mare; Bath
- Engagements: Second Boer War; World War I: Western Front; Salonika; World War II: Normandy; Arnhem; Reichswald; Rhine Crossing

The 1st Somersetshire Engineers was a volunteer unit of Britain's Royal Engineers (RE) whose history dated back to 1868. As the engineer component of the 43rd (Wessex) Division, the unit served in both World Wars, distinguishing itself at the assault crossing of the River Seine at Vernon in August 1944 and in the doomed attempt to relieve the 1st Airborne Division at Arnhem. A detachment also served as airborne engineers in Sicily, Italy and at Arnhem. Their successors served on in the Territorial Army until 1967.

== Origins ==
The enthusiasm for the Volunteer movement following an invasion scare in 1859 saw the creation of many Rifle, Artillery and Engineer Volunteer units composed of part-time soldiers eager to supplement the Regular British Army in time of need. One such unit was the 1st Somersetshire Engineer Volunteer Corps (EVC) formed at Nailsea on 5 September 1868. The unit soon had two companies at Nailsea and one at Weston-super-Mare, where the headquarters was moved in 1873.

From the beginning, the 1st Somerset EVC was attached to the 1st Administrative Battalion, Gloucestershire Engineer Volunteers. With the reorganisation of the Volunteer Force in 1880, the Gloucestershire Admin Bn was consolidated as the 1st Gloucestershire (The Western Counties) Engineer Volunteers, Royal Engineers, with the 1st Somerset providing G and H Companies at Nailsea and I Company at Weston-super-Mare. The EVC titles were abandoned in 1888, when the units became 'Engineer Volunteers, Royal Engineers', proclaiming their affiliation to the Regular RE, and then simply 'Royal Engineers (Volunteers)' in 1896.

In August 1889, the Devon and Somerset companies were removed from the 1st Gloucestershire and constituted as a separate 1st Devonshire and Somersetshire RE (V), with its HQ at Exeter. The unit sent a detachment of one officer and 25 other ranks to assist the regular REs during the Second Boer War in 1900, and a second section the following year.

== Territorial Force ==
When the Volunteers were subsumed into the new Territorial Force (TF) in 1908, the Devon and Somerset Engineers were split to form the Devonshire Fortress Royal Engineers at Plymouth and the Somerset-based divisional engineers for the Wessex Division. The latter unit was organised as follows:

Wessex Divisional Engineers

- HQ and 1st Wessex Field Company at the Victoria Drill Hall, Upper Bristol Road, Bath, Somerset
- 2nd Wessex Field Company at Churchill Road, Weston-super-Mare
- Wessex Divisional Telegraph (later Signal) Company
  - HQ and No 1 Section at The Priory, Colleton Crescent, Exeter
  - No 2 (Devon and Cornwall) Section attached to the Devon and Cornwall Brigade
  - No 3 (South Western) Section attached to the South Western Brigade
  - No 4 (Hampshire) Section attached to the Hampshire Brigade

The divisional Commander Royal Engineers (CRE) was Lt-Col Sidney Keen, TD.

== World War I ==
=== Mobilisation ===
At the end of July 1914, the Wessex Division was at its annual training camp on Salisbury Plain when warning orders were received on 29 July, By the time war was declared on 4 August, the division was already at its war stations, defending the ports of southern England. Full mobilisation followed and, by 10 August, the division was back on Salisbury Plain undergoing war training.

On 31 August 1914, the formation of 2nd Line units for each existing TF unit was authorised. Initially these were formed from men who had not volunteered for overseas service, together with the recruits who were flooding in. The titles of these units would be the same as the original, but distinguished by a '2/' prefix. An additional 1/3rd (Wessex) Field Company and its 2nd Line had also been formed before the end of September. Later, the 2nd Line were sent overseas and replaced by 3rd Line or Reserve units. At least one such unit, later designated 508th (Wessex) Reserve Field Company, was formed in January 1917 but was probably absorbed into the central training organisation after August.

On 24 September 1914, at the special request of Lord Kitchener, the Wessex Division (later numbered 43rd (Wessex) Division) volunteered to serve in India in order to relieve Regular Army units for service on the Western Front. The infantry and artillery embarked on 9 October, but the divisional engineers, signallers and other support services were left in the UK.

=== 27th Divisional Engineers ===
During the winter of 1914–15, three new Regular Army Divisions were formed in England from the units returned from India. The Wessex Divisional Engineers were assigned to the first of these, 27th Division:

27th Divisional Engineers

- 1/1st Wessex Field Company
- 1/2nd Wessex Field Company
- 1/1st South Midland Field Company – joined from the South Midland Division, TF, on 4 December 1914; left 17 March 1915
- 17th Field Company – Regular unit transferred from 5th Division on 24 March 1915
- 1st Wessex Divisional Signal Company

Lieutenant-Colonel Keen assumed the role of CRE of 27th Division on 23 November 1914 and the engineers joined the division at Magdalen Hill Camp, Winchester, on the 27th. The division embarked from Southampton on 19–21 December, concentrating near Arques in France by 25 December.

==== Western Front ====
27th Division served on the Western Front for almost a year, taking part in the Action at St Eloi (14–15 March) and the Second Battle of Ypres (22 April–25 May). On 17 November, the division embarked from Marseille for the Macedonian front.

==== Salonika ====
27th Division completed its disembarkation at Salonika on 17 February 1916. In August the forward Allied troops were thrown into disarray by a Bulgarian attack, and the British took up positions along the River Struma. 27th Division was then ordered to destroy two railway bridges across its tributary, the River Angista, to delay the Bulgarian advance towards the Struma. A mixed party of six officers and 77 other ranks, drawn from 17th Field Company, RE, the divisional mounted squadron (Surrey Yeomanry) and the cyclist company, went out from the Struma bridgehead at Neohori, and blew up the first bridge early in the morning of 20 August. The second bridge was damaged enough to stop trains crossing. The party withdrew with only one officer and one man wounded.

A second, larger raid, was then mounted, by a detachment of 17th Fd Co, Yeomanry, mounted infantry and cyclists, covered by 3rd Bn King's Royal Rifle Corps and two guns of 99th Battery Royal Field Artillery. The party moved out from Neohori bridge before dawn on 23 August and burned two out of three target bridges over the Angista before being attacked. A planned movement to bridges further away was abandoned, but one party of sappers and mounted infantry slipped upstream unseen and destroyed the third Angista bridge.

27th Division's first offensive action was on 30 September 1916 when it made a dawn attack across the River Struma to capture the villages of Karajakoi Bala and Karajakoi Zir. 1/1st Wessex Fd Co then erected Wire entanglements around the captured villages before Bulgarian counter-attacks came in after dark. The attack was then continued to extend the position to include the village of Yenikoi, by 4 October.

The next attack was across the Virhanli Stream against Tumbitza Farm on the night of 16/17 November. 10th Battalion Cameron Highlanders was ordered to attack across a pontoon bridge laid by No 4 Section of 1/2nd Wessex Fd Co, but in the dark they found the stream was too wide. The infantry were already exhausted from carrying the pontoons, which had to be left hidden when the force withdrew. A second attempt was made in thick fog on the morning of 6 December by 2nd Bn Gloucestershire Regiment. No 4 Section erected the bridge in 10 minutes, but the attackers were beaten back. A renewed attack at dawn on 7 December also failed, the bridge being destroyed by Bulgarian shellfire, even though the Wessex sappers discovered that the stream was only waist-deep and could be forded.

The TF field companies were numbered on 1 February 1917, the two in 27th Division becoming 500th (1st Wessex) and 501st (2nd Wessex) respectively.

27th Division was not involved in the Second Battle of Doiran, and little else happened on the British part of the Macedonian Front in 1917. 27th Division spent almost two years in the malarial Struma Valley, the only significant action occurring when the division took part in the capture of Homondos on 14 October. The front became active again in September 1918 when the Allies began the final offensive and 27th Division was engaged in the capture of the Roche Noire Salient, followed by the passage of the Vardar and pursuit to the Strumica Valley.

==== Black Sea ====
The Armistice of Salonica was signed by Bulgaria on 29 September 1918, ending hostilities on the Macedonian Front. 27th Division withdrew back down the Struma, but in December it embarked for the Black Sea, the first brigade accompanied by 17th Fd Co reaching Batum on 22 December. The rest of the division arrived by the end of January. The force was part of the British intervention in the complex situation of independent regimes that had emerged in the Caucasus region following the collapse of the Russian and Ottoman Turkish empires. Detachments of the division were scattered across the Azerbaijan Democratic Republic, Democratic Republic of Georgia and First Republic of Armenia. British troops began to withdraw in August 1919 and 27th Division was disbanded between 7 and 24 September after handing over to an Inter-Allied force at Batum.

=== 45th (2nd Wessex) Divisional Engineers ===
See main article 58th Divisional RE

The divisional engineers for the 2nd Wessex Division duplicated those of the 1st:

- 2/1st Wessex Field Company
- 2/2nd Wessex Field Company
- 2/1st Wessex Divisional Signal Company

The division was rapidly recruited, and it followed the 1st Line division to India in December 1914 (where it was later renumbered 45th (2nd Wessex) Division). Once again, the engineers and other support troops were left behind, and on 23 February 1916, 45th Divisional RE joined 58th (2/1st London) Division, becoming part of 58th Divisional RE for the rest of the war. The field companies later received the numbers 503 and 504, and the signal company became the 58th. They served with the division on the Western Front from February 1917 until the end of the war.

=== 57th (2nd West Lancashire) Divisional Engineers ===
See main article 57th (2nd West Lancashire) Division

A new 1/3rd Wessex Field Company was raised in September 1914 and the 2/3rd by the end of the year. They were eventually assigned to the 57th (2nd West Lancashire) Division, 1/3rd joining from Christchurch, Hampshire on 9 December 1915, and 2/3rd from Taunton in Somerset on 26 February 1916. In February 1917 they were numbered 502nd and 505th respectively. They served with the division on the Western Front from February 1917 until the end of the war.

== Interwar ==
43rd (Wessex) Division was reconstituted in the renamed Territorial Army (TA) in 1920. The divisional engineers were organised as follows:

- HQ at Upper Bristol Road, Bath
- 204th (Wessex) Field Company at Bath
- 205th (Wessex) Field Company at Weston-super-Mare
- 206th (Hampshire) Field Company at Portsmouth
- 207th (Wessex) Field Park Company at Bath – absorbed into divisional RE HQ 1924; reformed 1939

The signal company was transferred to the new Royal Corps of Signals formed in 1920 as 43rd (Wessex) Divisional Signals. In 1938, 206th (Hampshire) Field Company left to join Hampshire Fortress Royal Engineers where it became No 2 (206th) (Electric Light and Works) Company.

== World War II ==
=== Mobilisation ===
Immediately after the outbreak of war, a new 45th Infantry Division was formed (7 September 1939), once again as a 2nd Line duplicate of 43rd Division. The 1st and 2nd Line Field Companies were mixed across the two divisions.

=== 43rd (Wessex) Divisional Engineers ===
43rd (Wessex) Divisional insignia (WWII)

The divisional engineers were organised as follows:

- 204th (Wessex) Field Company at Bath
- 260th (Wessex) Field Company 2nd Line unit at Chippenham
- 553th Field Company – joined 13 January 1940
- 207th (Wessex) Field Park Company at Bath
- 13th Bridging Platoon – joined 1 October 1943

260th Fd Co usually operated with 129 Brigade, 553 Fd Co with 130 Bde and 204 Fd Co with 214 Bde.

For almost five years, the division remained in the UK on Home Defence and training, mainly at Stone Street near Folkestone in Kent. During that time, the three field companies 'bridged and re-bridged almost every river in Kent', and developed techniques for mine clearance.

==== Normandy ====
43rd (Wessex) Division finally embarked for Normandy on 17 June 1944. It completed landing on 24 June and immediately went into the Battle of the Odon (Operation Epsom). 260th Fd Co constructed a rough crossing of logs and stones over the River Odon under heavy fire and suffered severe casualties, but the success could not be exploited. As the division established itself along the valley of the Odon, the engineers built tank bridges to avoid bottlenecks over the few available stone bridges.

After weeks of bitter fighting around Hill 112 (Operation Jupiter) and Mont Pinçon (Operation Bluecoat), 43rd Division finally captured the latter on 7 August and prepared to bear down on the northern rim of the Falaise Pocket. 204th Fd Co discovered how strong the opposition would be when No 1 Platoon found itself under heavy machine gun fire from both flanks while clearing the route to Le Plessis Grimault at the foot of Mont Pinçon. They deployed to attack but found their firepower inadequate and the company commander withdrew the platoon by sections to the vehicles, aboard which they then shot their way through, followed by 207th Field Park Company's armoured bulldozer.

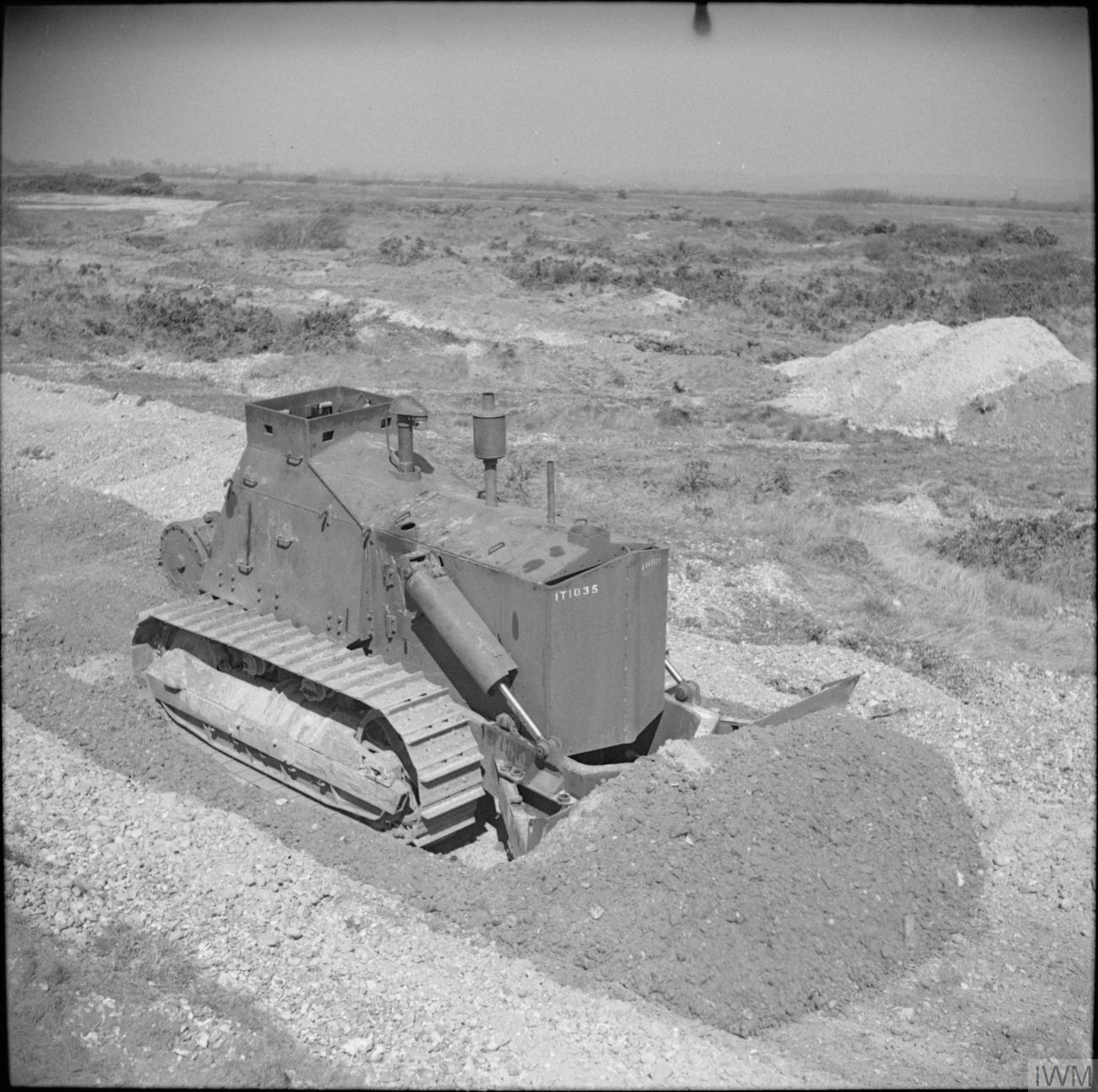
British D7 armoured bulldozer

By 14 August, the division had pushed to the north bank of the River Noireau, where the crossings had been measured by the RE Reconnaissance Party. During the night of 15/16 August, the infantry waded across and established a bridgehead, while 204 Fd Co advanced with a waterproofed bulldozer, three tipper lorries of flexboards, four landing stage units and two boat units, and No 1 Platoon got to work on clearing mines, building a tank ford and a trestle bridge. Downstream, the river split into two streams, but No 2 Platoon erected two Class 9 trestle bridges. Meanwhile, 553 Fd Co began work on the division's first Bailey bridge across the demolished road bridge. They found that the bridge abutments were too small to take the baseplates, which had to be set back, meaning that a 120-foot (37 m) span rather than 80 foot (25 m) was required. Work could not be started until daylight and it took two days to clear all the booby-trapped mines, 204 Fd Co losing a complete section of men. Lieutenant Martin and Sapper Murphy discovered that the mines had a new tamper-proof TMIZ 43 igniter, which led to a new recovery drill throughout the army, probably saving hundreds of lives.

==== Vernon Bridge ====
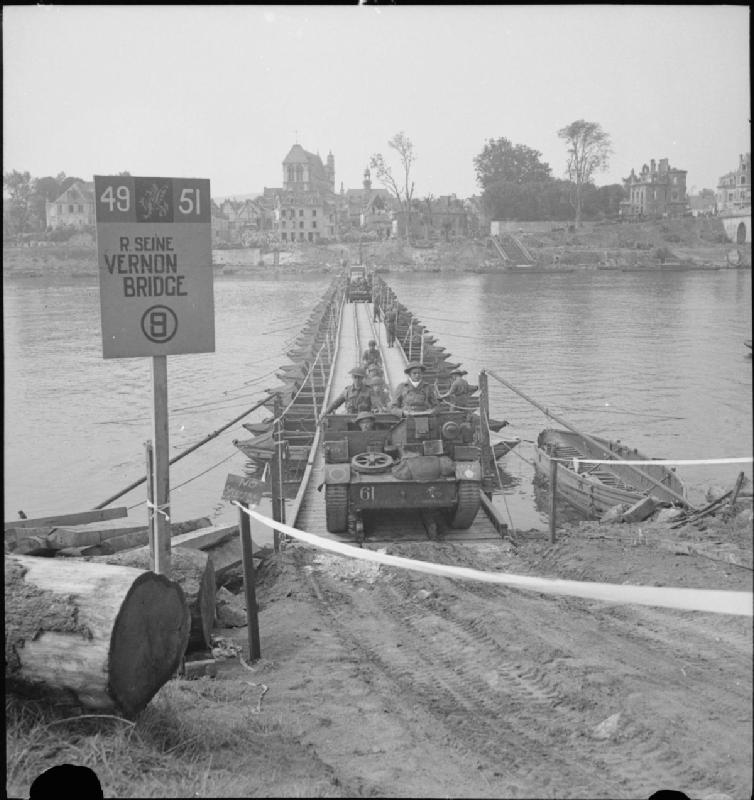
4th Bn Dorsets cross 'David', the Class 9 FBE bridge at Vernon, 27 August 1944. The numbers 49 and 51 either side of the Wessex Wyvern divisional badge are the identification serials of 204 and 553 Field Companies RE.

43rd Division was now given the opportunity to spearhead XXX Corps' advance to the Seine ('Operation Loopy'). Bridging the river would be a major operation, and the force was split into three large convoys of divisional troops, engineers and bridging equipment. 43rd Divisional Engineers were in the first, the Assault Group, which set off early on 24 August. En route, the bridges over the Eure at Pacy had been destroyed, but this had been planned for, and extra Bailey equipment had been taken. While 260th Fd Co dealt with the craters and boobytrapped roadblocks, 11th Fd Co from XXX Corps spent the night assembling the Bailey bridge. At first light the convoy drove on to the Seine at full speed.

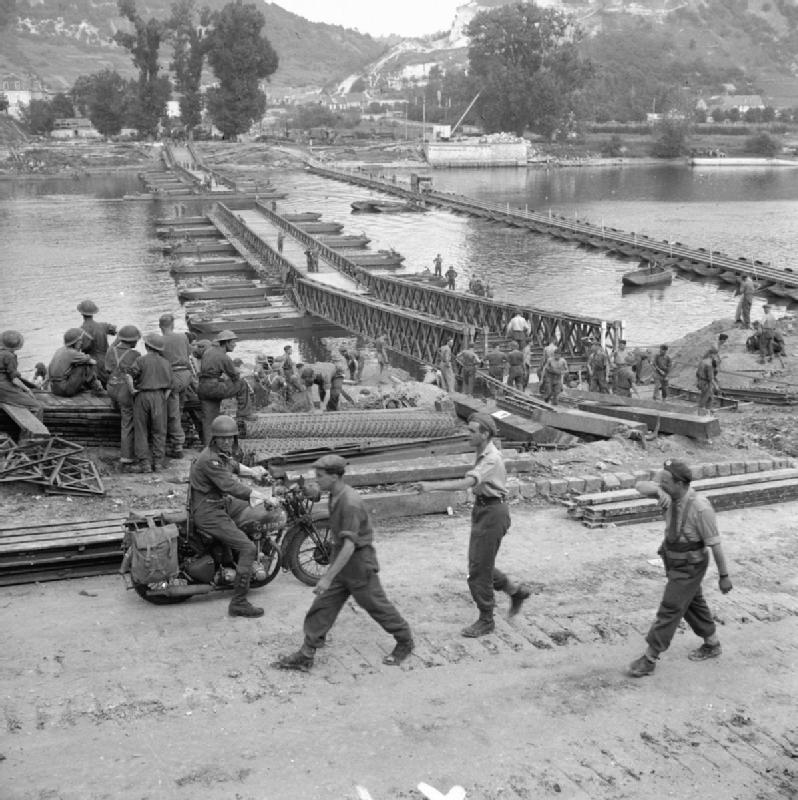
The first Bailey bridge nears completion alongside 'David', 28 August 1944

The assault was ordered for 19.00 on 25 August, with a reinforced brigade crossing on a two-battalion front, one either side of the destroyed road bridge. While 15th (Kent) GHQ Troops Royal Engineers ferried the assault troops across, and other RE units prepared to build a heavy Bailey bridge, 43rd Divisional Engineers had the task of constructing a Class 9 Folding Boat Equipment (FBE) bridge on rafts. It emerged that DUKW amphibious vehicles could not enter the river, so the assault had to be carried out with powered storm boats, until 260 Fd Co had bulldozed ramps in the river bank. 553rd and 204th Fd Companies began work on the bridge after an approach had been bulldozed under intense machine gun and mortar fire. Close support rafts built by 553rd Fd Co were taken over next morning by 15th (Kent) GHQT RE to continue the ferrying operation and support the hard-pressed assault troops on the far side.

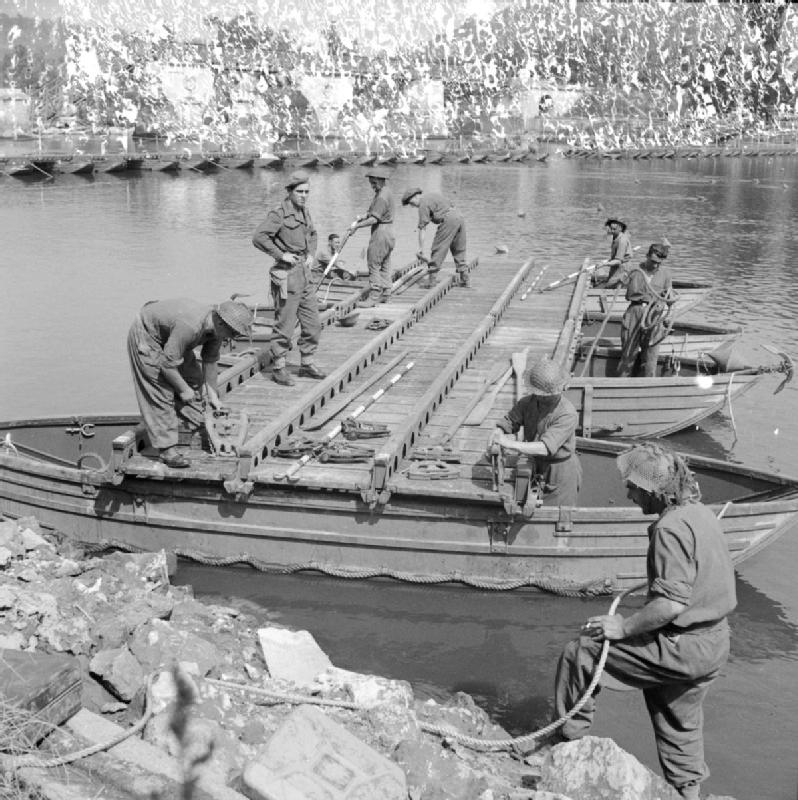
Sappers repair the pontoon bridge at Vernon, damaged by German mortar fire

During the morning of 26 August, 553rd and 204th Fd Companies completed the rear trestle and approach to the bridge, but when attempts were made to bring in the rafts to form the first bridge, they were raked by fire in mid-stream and about two-thirds of the crews became casualties. By mid-day, half the rafts were in position, but casualties were so heavy that the CRE of 43rd Division, Lt-Col Tom Evill, temporarily withdrew his men. In the afternoon the enemy fire slackened, and the Class 9 bridge (named 'David') was complete by 17.20. Light traffic began to flow, but with little hope of the Bailey bridge ('Goliath') being ready quickly, the Corps Chief Engineer, Brig B.C. Davey, ordered a Bailey pontoon raft to be built as a ferry. With all of the available bridging engineers fully employed, Davey set 207th Fd Park Co to start unloading equipment and reconnoitring approaches while specialist sappers were called up from the rear. The first vehicle rafted across was an RE bulldozer to prepare a ramp; however, it became bogged down and a new ramp had to be built. By 06.00 on 27 August the first tanks were being ferried across to drive off German counter-attacks.

German shellfire continued, with 'David' receiving a direct hit that sank two boats and caused a traffic delay of one and three-quarter hours, and another shell causing 20 casualties among sappers working on 'Goliath'. The latter was open to traffic by 19.30 and a second Class 40 Bailey bridge by noon on 29 August. 11th Armoured Division crossed over and passed through 43rd Division to continue the pursuit across Northern France into Belgium.

==== Arnhem ====
43rd Division had a crucial role in the plan for Operation Market Garden, which aimed to seize a 60-mile road corridor to the Lower Rhine at Arnhem using bridges captured by airborne forces. Anticipating that many of the bridges would be destroyed and would hold up the advance of Guards Armoured Division in the lead, 43rd Division following up was responsible for assault crossings and bridging where necessary. A huge number of sappers were assembled, with 2277 vehicles to carry the necessary equipment. The operation began on 17 September and 43rd Division passed through Guards Armoured after Nijmegen and fought their way across the low-lying country known as 'The Island', leading elements reaching the banks of the Lower Rhine late on 23 September. By now the 1st Airborne Division was in a desperate plight, hemmed into a small pocket on the other side of the river, with no bridges. Only 16 unpowered assault boats were available, but that night 204th Fd Co and the 5th Bn Dorsetshire Regiment used these to ferry men of the 1st Polish Parachute Brigade across to reinforce 1st Airborne.

It was now recognised that the Airborne position across the river was untenable, and that assault bridging was unfeasible under direct enemy observation, so the decision was made to evacuate what remained of 1st Airborne. The plan was for 43rd Division to take a firmer grip on the opposite bank during the night of 24/25 September, with 204 Fd Co ferrying across more of the Polish paratroopers and 4th Bn Dorsets using the remaining stormboats together with 20 more assault bats due to arrive from the rear. However, in the darkness two of the lorries bringing the boats took a wrong turning and were captured by the enemy, two more slipped off the muddy road, and only one arrived safely, bringing boats but no paddles. The crossing of the Poles was therefore cancelled and all the boats concentrated for 4th Dorset. Under heavy fire only a few of the boats made it, and only a handful of the infantry reached the Airborne perimeter. Although 204 Fd Co got about 2 tons of stores across, all the available DUKWs were bogged.

The evacuation proceeded the following night under the control of 43rd Division's CRE, Lt-Col W.C.A. Henniker. He had 260 Fd Co and 23rd Canadian Fd Co operating a boat ferry to the Airborne perimeter, and another manned by 553 Fd Co and 20 Canadian Fd Co at the site of 4th Dorsets' crossing. At each site there were 16 assault boats manned by 43rd Divisional Engineers and 21 motorised stormboats provided by the Canadians. Throughout the night, partly shielded by darkness and rain but under heavy mortar fire, the sappers crossed and recrossed the river bringing back a steady stream of wounded or exhausted men. Over 2000 men of 1st Airborne were evacuated, but few of the 4th Dorsets could be found.

After the battle ended, Lt-Col Henniker and his divisional sappers were given the role of protecting the vital bridges at Nijmegen that were XXX Corps' lifeline. Reinforced with two batteries from 73rd Anti-Tank Regiment and B Company 8th Bn Middlesex Regiment (the divisional machine-gun battalion), they constituted the 'close bridge garrison', with little between themselves and active German forces a short distance upstream. German Frogmen succeeded in attaching explosive charges to the bridges under cover of darkness, which caused damage that the sappers had to repair.

==== Geilenkirchen ====
In November, XXX Corps attacked south-eastwards out of The Island towards Geilenkirchen (Operation Clipper), using 43rd Division and the US 84th Division. In preparation for the attack, 43rd Divisional Engineers had to lift a defensive minefield previously laid by 84th Division. 'By the morning of 14 November, 204 Fd Co had picked up a considerable number of these American mines and loaded them on lorries. Major Evill, the Company Commander, decided to dump them near the Custom House on the German border, where 129 Brigade Headquarters was established'. During the afternoon some 700 of these mines exploded simultaneously, killing 14 sappers of No 1 Platoon, wounding six others and fatally injuring the brigade commander, Brig G.H.L. Mole.

Preparations for the attack continued with the sappers constructing tracks across the muddy country, which were named 'Savile Row', 'Bond Street' (after famous London streets) and 'Wyvern Road' (from the divisional badge). After six days of heavy fighting (18–23 November), including driving off counter-attacks by Panzer troops, the objectives were taken. The divisional engineers struggled to get roads open through the mud and destroyed villages, and the weather brought the end of the operation.

==== Rhineland ====
43rd Division took part in operation Operation Blackcock in January 1945 to clear the Roer Triangle, and thanks to the weight of artillery and armoured support it took its objectives with little opposition. A large crater on the main road revealed in aerial photographs caused concern, and the sappers had constructed a large Bailey bridge ('Sydney') on sledges to push into position. Only then did they discover that the 'crater' was a dust spot on a photograph and did not exist.

On 16 February 1945, as part of Operation Veritable, 43rd Division 'carried out a brilliant 8000 yards advance which brought them to the escarpment overlooking the fortified town of Goch', regarded as the turning-point of the operation. At the foot of the escarpment lay an anti-tank ditch that had to be crossed before an attack could be launched on Goch. 204 Field Co and two platoons of 260 Fd Co were ordered to prepare six crossings during the night of 17/18 February. Five were completed by dawn but the sixth, at a road crossing, took longer, and lorries delivering material after daybreak came under fire before it was completed for 15th (Scottish) Division to pass through for the assault.

43rd Division was next tasked with capturing Xanten. Again, the town was protected by an anti-tank ditch. Lieutenant-Colonel Henniker had 553 Fd Co build a 70-foot (20 m) Bailey on skids improvised by 207 Fd Pk Co. This was towed down the road by two AVREs of 81st Assault Squadron, RE, from 79th Armoured Division, accompanied by an AVRE with a 'Jumbo' scissors bridge, two more AVREs with fascines, two armoured bulldozers and 20 three-ton lorries loaded with rubble. The intention was to launch the Bailey bridge over the gap where the road crossed the ditch, while the AVREs and a platoon of 260th Fd Co would make a second crossing. If the Bailey was unsuccessful the bulldozers would fill the crater with rubble. Half an hour before first light on 8 March, the engineer column advanced up the road behind the barrage with the assaulting infantry, supported by Churchill Crocodiles. It emerged that the gap in the road was in fact two craters, too long for the Bailey on skids, and the fascines failed to provide a passable crossing for tracked vehicles, despite the efforts of 260th Fd Co. However, the AVRE bridgelayer was successful in bridging the ditch some 50 yards (45 m) from the crater, and the Crocodiles, tanks and infantry passed over. The redundant Bailey section on the road was pulled back with difficulty before 260 Fd Co's lorries could begin delivering rubble. Under heavy fire they constructed a crossing for wheeled vehicles by midday on 9 March. Xanten fell by the end of the day and by 10.40 on 11 March, no Germans remained west of the Rhine and they blew their last bridges over the river.

==== Germany ====
Preparations for the Rhine crossing (Operation Plunder) involved 'probably the largest accumulation of engineer equipment ever assembled in the history of the Army'. The assault on XXX Corps' front was to be carried out by 51st (Highland) Division, after which 43rd Wessex was to pass through and continue the advance. However, 43rd Divisional Engineers was allotted to assist 51st (Highland) in the crossing on 25 March, before rejoining its division when it concentrated on the far side on 27 March.

For the pursuit, 43rd Division was organised in five groups led by the Armoured Thrust Group, accompanied by 260th Fd Co. This force had to fight through tenacious rearguards from the German 6th Parachute Division, but reached the Twente Canal by 1 April. Rather than force this major obstacle, 43rd Division made a flank march to the end of the canal at Hengelo, where 204 Fd Co was to construct a bridge if necessary, though the town fell quickly.

On 14 April, the division crossed the River Lethe at Cloppenburg, where 204th Fd Co incurred severe casualties bridging the river under shellfire. The following day the division decisively crushed the last organised counter-attack against its troops. For the rest of the month 43rd Division protected the left flank of XXX Corps' drive towards Bremen. On 30 April, the 43rd Division closed up to the small River Wörpe at Grasburg, which the leading infantry crossed while 204th Fd Co repaired the road bridge. The next day the advance was held up by numerous large craters in the causeway carrying the road, each of which had to be bridged under fire from Self-propelled guns, which was not complete until 3 May. On 4 May, the division's infantry crossed the Oste-Hamme Canal by a footbridge, while 553 Fd Co built a Class 40 Bailey Bridge before the end of the day. The division's further advance to capture Bremerhaven the next day was forestalled by the German surrender at Lüneburg Heath.

=== 45th Divisional Engineers ===
45th Divisional insignia (WWII)

The new 45th Infantry Division was formed on 7 September 1939 as a 2nd Line duplicate of 43rd Division. It was placed on a lower establishment in December 1941, and disbanded in August 1944. Its engineers were organised as follows:

- 205th (Wessex) Field Company, 1st Line unit at Weston-super-Mare – joined 55th (West Lancashire) Division 1 August 1944
- 259th (Wessex) Field Company, 2nd Line unit at Uffculme – joined 55th (West Lancashire) Division 1 August 1944
- 562nd Field Company (joined 1 January 1940 – left 8 December 1941
- 261st (Wessex) Field Park Company 2nd Line unit at Uffculme – joined 1st Airborne Division on 15 December 1941, replaced in 45th by a field stores section

55th Division had been a home defence and training formation on a low establishment for most of the war. Although it was raised to a higher establishment in 1944 when the two Wessex RE companies joined, it never went overseas, and served in Home Forces until the end of the war.

=== 1st Airborne Divisional Engineers ===
British Airborne units' insignia

This division was organised in November 1941 and 261st Field Park Company was one of the first units to join. It trained in the UK until April 1943 when it sailed to North Africa to prepare for Operation Husky (the Allied invasion of Sicily). For this assault, 261st Fd Park Co made special equipment, including dummy parachutists. The night before the landings, part of the company flew with the RAF scattering these dummies over various parts of the island.

1st Airborne Division made an unopposed landing at Taranto on 7 September 1943, quickly securing the 'heel' of Italy. Sections of the railway were still working, and 'an enterprising patrol, travelling in a train driven by a sapper of 261st Field Park Company, raided deeply into enemy territory and released 300 prisoners of war'.

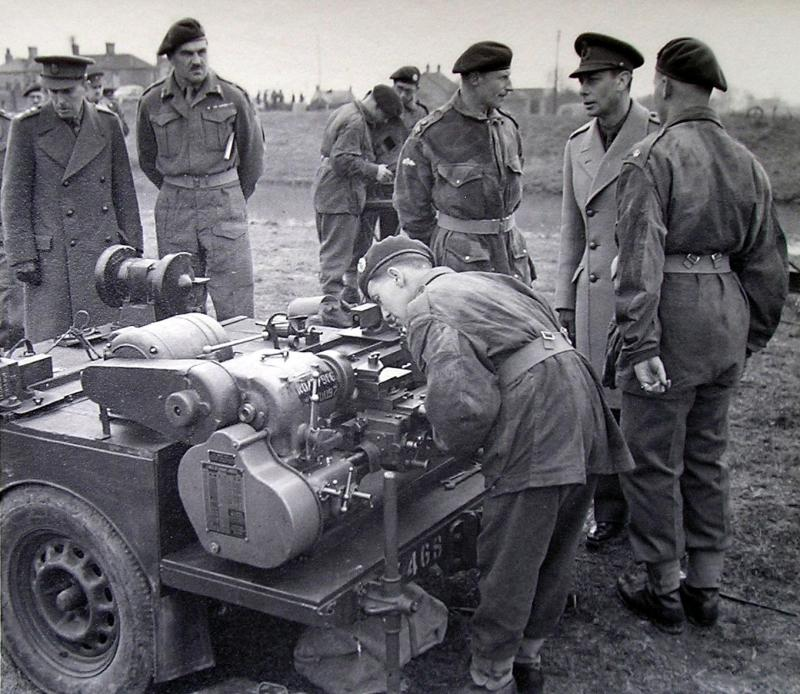
King George VI, accompanied by senior officers, visits men of the 261st Field Park Company, Royal Engineers, 1st Airborne Division, March 1944. Stood second from the left is the division's GOC, Major General Roy Urquhart.

Three small detachments from 261 (Airborne) Field Park Company went to Arnhem during Operation Market Garden, attached to the field company with each of the division's three brigades. They were flown into the Landing Zone by glider from RAF Tarrant Rushton on 18 September (the second day of the operation). Detachment 2 was unable to join 1st Parachute Squadron RE, which was cut off at Arnhem bridge, but the other two made contact successfully.

During the final stages of the defence of the Arnhem bridgehead, the sappers held the western side under Brigadier Pip Hicks, along with members of the Glider Pilot Regiment, remnants of 1st Bn Border Regiment and a few Polish paratroopers. Of the detachment from 261 Co, two died, 12 were evacuated, and six remained missing at the end of the operation.

In March 1945, the company was redesignated an Airborne Park Squadron and it accompanied the division to Norway at the end of the war (Operation Doomsday). It was disbanded in November 1945.

== Postwar ==
In 1946, 43rd Divisional Engineers was combined with VIII Corps Troops, Royal Engineers to form 29th Army Troops RE, including 204 and 207 Companies, before they were demobilised. When the TA was reconstituted in 1947, 43rd Divisional Engineers were reformed at Bath as 110 Engineer Regiment, with the following organisation:

- 204 Field Squadron
- 226 Field Squadron at Oxford
- 260 Field Squadron, disbanded 1956
- 207 Field Park Squadron

The regiment was reorganised as 43rd (Wessex) Division/District RE in 1961, with 226 Sqn becoming an independent unit and 207 Sqn disbanded. The unit and its remaining squadron were disbanded when the TA was reduced into the Territorial and Army Volunteer Reserve (TAVR) in 1967. Some of the personnel formed 3 Troop in 100 Fd Sqn (Militia), others joined the Somerset Yeomanry and Light Infantry in TAVR.

== Honorary Colonels ==
The following officers served as Honorary Colonel of the unit:

- Field Marshal Sir Lintorn Simmons, RE, appointed to 1st Devonshire and Somersetshire EVC 14 July 1888
- Capt. H. B. O. Saville, CB, VD appointed to Wessex Divisional Engineers
- Col. Robert Brindley Pitt, CBE, MC, TD, AMInstCE, AMIMechE, appointed to 43rd (Wessex) Divisional Engineers 26 June 1937.

== External sources ==
- The Drill Hall Project.
- Great War Forum
- Pegasus Archive
