= 45th (2nd Wessex) Division =

2nd Wessex Division 45th (2nd Wessex) Division
- Active: October 1914 – 1919
- Country: United Kingdom
- Branch: Territorial Force
- Type: Infantry
- Size: Division
- Engagements: First World War

The 45th Infantry Division was an infantry division of the Territorial Force, part of the British Army. It was formed in the First World War as a duplicate of the 43rd (Wessex) Division and was originally formed as the 2nd Wessex Division in 1914–1915 before later being renamed as the 45th (2nd Wessex) Division and the brigades numbered. It was sent overseas to India in December 1914 to relieve Regular Army units for service in France. The division remained there for the rest of the war, supplying drafts of replacements to the British units fighting in the Middle East and later complete battalions.

== History ==
In accordance with the Territorial and Reserve Forces Act 1907 (7 Edw. 7, c.9) which brought the Territorial Force into being, the TF was intended to be a home defence force for service during wartime and members could not be compelled to serve outside the country. However, on the outbreak of war on 4 August 1914, many members volunteered for Imperial Service. Therefore, TF units were split into 1st Line (liable for overseas service) and 2nd Line (home service for those unable or unwilling to serve overseas) units. 2nd Line units performed the home defence role, although in fact most of these were also posted abroad in due course.

On 15 August 1915, TF units were instructed to separate home service men from those who had volunteered for overseas service (1st Line), with the home service personnel to be formed into reserve units (2nd Line). On 31 August, 2nd Line units were authorized for each 1st Line unit where more than 60% of men had volunteered for overseas service. After being organized, armed and clothed, the 2nd Line units were gradually grouped into large formations thereby forming the 2nd Line brigades and divisions. These 2nd Line units and formations had the same name and structure as their 1st Line parents. On 24 November, it was decided to replace imperial service (1st Line) formations as they proceeded overseas with their reserve (2nd Line) formations. A second reserve (3rd Line) unit was then formed at the peace headquarters of the 1st Line.

The 2nd Wessex Division was formed in October 1914 as a 2nd Line duplicate of the Wessex Division. Most of the units were only raised after the departure of the 1st Line division to India in the same month; officers and men of the 1st Line units left behind formed the core of the new units. In the event, the division did not consist of much more than 12 infantry battalions and 12 artillery batteries; no ammunition columns, signals or train companies were formed. The divisional engineers and signals remained in the UK and later joined 58th Divisional RE.

On 22 September, India agreed to send 32 British and 20 Indian regular battalions to Europe in exchange for 43 partially trained TF battalions. (Note: The 32 British regular battalions thus relieved formed the bulk of the 27th (10 battalions), 28th (10 battalions), and 29th Divisions (9 battalions, including 3 from Burma) and part of the 8th (3 battalions).) Initially, it was intended that the Welsh Division would join the Wessex and Home Counties Divisions in India, but on 25 November, 10 infantry battalions and three field artillery brigades (Note: The basic organic unit of the Royal Artillery was, and is, the Battery. When grouped together they formed brigades, in the same way that infantry battalions or cavalry regiments were grouped together in brigades. At the outbreak of the First World War, a field artillery brigade of headquarters (4 officers, 37 other ranks), three batteries (5 and 193 each), and a brigade ammunition column (4 and 154) had a total strength just under 800 so was broadly comparable to an infantry battalion (just over 1,000) or a cavalry regiment (about 550). Like an infantry battalion, an artillery brigade was usually commanded by a Lieutenant-Colonel. These figures refer to 6-gun batteries; Territorial Force artillery batteries were organized on a 4-gun basis at the outbreak of the war, so strengths would be approximately two thirds of this. Artillery brigades were redesignated as regiments in 1938.) (9 batteries of 15 pounders) of the 2nd Wessex Division were selected instead. On 12 December, the division embarked at Southampton with 263 officers, 9,344 other ranks and 36 guns. The 2/4th DCLI and 2/4th Hampshires landed at Karachi on 9 January 1915 and the rest of the division at Bombay between 4 and 8 January.

The division was effectively broken up on arrival in India in January 1915; the units reverted to peacetime conditions and were dispersed throughout India and Burma. The battalions were posted to Bombay, Poona, Secunderabad (2), Bangalore, Ahmednagar, Karachi, Quetta, Wellington and Meiktila and the artillery brigades at Kirkee, Secunderabad and Bangalore. The Territorial Force divisions and brigades were numbered in May 1915 in the order that they departed for overseas service, starting with the 42nd (East Lancashire) Division. The 2nd Wessex Division should have been numbered as the 45th (2nd Wessex) Division, but as the division had already been broken up, this was merely a place holder. The 2nd/1st Hampshire, 2nd/1st South Western and 2nd/1st Devon and Cornwall Brigades were notionally numbered as 134th, 135th and 136th, respectively.

The units pushed on with training to prepare for active service, handicapped by the need to provide experienced manpower for active service units. By early 1916 it had become obvious that it would not be possible to transfer the division to the Western Front as originally intended. Nevertheless, individual units of the division proceeded overseas on active service through the rest of the war.

In 1916 and 1917, the artillery was reorganized; the batteries were initially lettered A, B and C in each brigade, one battery in each brigade was broken up to make the other batteries up to 6 guns and these were then numbered and rearmed with 18 pounders.

Reorganisation of the artillery
Named brigade	Named battery	Lettered battery	Numbered brigade	Numbered battery	Notes
2/I Wessex	2/1st Hampshire	A	CCXXV	1097	Transferred to CCXVI Brigade, 43rd Division by April 1917
2/I Wessex	2/2nd Hampshire	B	CCXXV	1098	Transferred to CCXXVIII Brigade by April 1917
2/I Wessex	2/3rd Hampshire	C	CCXXV	1099	Broken up in 1917
2/III Wessex	2/6th Hampshire	A	CCXXVII	1102	Broken up in 1917
2/III Wessex	2/1st Dorsetshire	B	CCXXVII	1103	Transferred to CCXXVIII Brigade by April 1917
2/III Wessex	2/1st Wiltshire	C	CCXXVII	1104	Transferred to CCXVI Brigade, 43rd Division by April 1917
2/IV Wessex	2/1st Devonshire	A	CCXXVIII	1105	Went to Aden on 12 August 1916 where it remained until March 1919
2/IV Wessex	2/2nd Devonshire	B	CCXXVIII	1106	Broken up in 1917
2/IV Wessex	2/3rd Devonshire	C	CCXXVIII	1107	Transferred to XXI Brigade at Quetta in April 1917; it took part in the Third Anglo-Afghan War with 4th (Quetta) Division in May – August 1919

In 1917, five battalions went to Palestine between April and October, and two more went to Mesopotamia in September. By the beginning of 1918, just five batteries (Note: Becke says just four batteries remained in India by the beginning of 1918. This is an error. Two batteries (1097 and 1104) were with CCXVI Brigade, 43rd Division; two (1098 and 1103) were with CCXXVIII Brigade, 45th Division; and one (1107) was with XXI Brigade, 4th (Quetta) Division.) and three battalions remained in India. During 1919, the remaining units were reduced and returned to England and the division ceased to exist.

== Orders of Battle ==
45th (2nd Wessex) Division
The division commanded the following units during the First World War.
2nd/1st Hampshire Brigade: 2/4th Battalion, Hampshire Regiment; 2/5th Battalion, Hampshire Regiment; 2/6th Battalion, Hampshire Regiment (Note: The following units did not go to India with the division: 2/6th Battalion, Hampshire Regiment – remained in the United Kingdom providing drafts before being absorbed into the 5th (Reserve) Battalion, Hampshire Regiment (former 3/5th Battalion) on 1 September 1916; 2/5th Battalion, Devonshire Regiment – went to Egypt in September 1915; disbanded in June 1916 with personnel to 1/4th, 1/5th and 1/6th Devons; 2/II Wessex (Howitzer) Brigade, RFA – remained in the United Kingdom throughout the war as a reserve formation; it was broken up in January 1919; 2/1st Wessex (Hampshire) Heavy Battery, RGA – remained in the United Kingdom throughout the war, providing drafts for its 1st Line; 2nd Wessex Divisional Engineers – joined 58th (2/1st London) Division in February 1916); 2/7th Battalion, Hampshire Regiment	Royal Artillery: 2/I Wessex Brigade, Royal Field Artillery (RFA); 2/1st Hampshire Battery, RFA; 2/2nd Hampshire Battery, RFA; 2/3rd Hampshire Battery, RFA; 2/II Wessex (Howitzer) Brigade, RFA; 2/4th Hampshire (Howitzer) Battery, RFA; 2/5th Hampshire (Howitzer) Battery, RFA; 2/III Wessex Brigade, RFA; 2/6th Hampshire Battery, RFA; 2/1st Dorsetshire Battery, RFA; 2/1st Wiltshire Battery, RFA; 2/IV Wessex Brigade, RFA; 2/1st Devonshire Battery, RFA; 2/2nd Devonshire Battery, RFA; 2/3rd Devonshire Battery, RFA; 2/1st Wessex (Hampshire) Heavy Battery, Royal Garrison Artillery (RGA)	Royal Engineers: 2/1st Wessex Field Company, RE; 2/2nd Wessex Field Company, RE; 2/1st Wessex Divisional Signal Company, RE
2nd/1st South Western Brigade: 2/4th Battalion, Prince Albert's (Somerset Light Infantry); 2/5th Battalion, Prince Albert's (Somerset Light Infantry); 2/4th Battalion, Dorsetshire Regiment; 2/4th Battalion, Duke of Edinburgh's (Wiltshire Regiment)		Royal Engineers: 2/1st Wessex Field Company, RE; 2/2nd Wessex Field Company, RE; 2/1st Wessex Divisional Signal Company, RE
2nd/1st Devon and Cornwall Brigade: 2/4th Battalion, Devonshire Regiment; 2/5th (Prince of Wales's) Battalion, Devonshire Regiment; 2/6th Battalion, Devonshire Regiment; 2/4th Battalion, Duke of Cornwall's Light Infantry		Royal Engineers: 2/1st Wessex Field Company, RE; 2/2nd Wessex Field Company, RE; 2/1st Wessex Divisional Signal Company, RE

== Commanders ==
Br.-Gen. R.J. Pinney was assigned to command the 2nd Wessex Division on formation on 9 October 1914. He was replaced two days later by Br.-Gen. G.S.McD. Elliot who remained in command until the division embarked for India. Br.-Gen. G.H. Nicholson commanded the division on its voyage; he handed over the troops on disembarkation and returned to England, arriving on 3 February 1915. All three officers had been colonels commanding brigades of the Wessex Division – Devon and Cornwall, South Western and Hampshire Brigades respectively – at the outbreak of the war.

== See also ==
- List of British divisions in World War I

== Bibliography ==
- Becke, Archibald F. (1935). Order of Battle of Divisions Part 1–The Regular British Divisions. London: HMSO. OCLC 4405016.
- Becke, Archibald F. (1936). Order of Battle of Divisions Part 2A. The Territorial Force Mounted Divisions and the 1st-Line Territorial Force Divisions (42–56). London: HMSO. OCLC 4405016.
- Becke, Archibald F. (1937). Order of Battle of Divisions Part 2B. The 2nd-Line Territorial Force Divisions (57th–69th) with The Home-Service Divisions (71st–73rd) and 74th and 75th Divisions. London: HMSO. OCLC 4405016.
- Bellis, Malcolm A. (1994). Regiments of the British Army 1939–1945 (Armour & Infantry). London: Military Press International. ISBN 0-85420-999-9.
- Bellis, Malcolm A. (1995). Regiments of the British Army 1939–1945 (Artillery). London: Military Press International. ISBN 0-85420-110-6.
- James, Brigadier E.A. (1978). British Regiments 1914–18. London: Samson Books Limited. ISBN 0-906304-03-2.
- Joslen, Lt-Col H.F. (1990) [1st. Pub. HMSO:1960]. Orders of Battle, Second World War, 1939–1945. London: London Stamp Exchange. ISBN 0-948130-03-2.
- Perry, F.W. (1993). Order of Battle of Divisions Part 5B. Indian Army Divisions. Newport: Ray Westlake Military Books. ISBN 1-871167-23-X.
- Rinaldi, Richard A (2008). Order of Battle of the British Army 1914. Ravi Rikhye. ISBN 978-0-97760728-0.
- Westlake, Ray (1986). The Territorial Battalions, A Pictorial History, 1859–1985. Tunbridge Wells: Spellmount.
