= Maltot =

- Commune
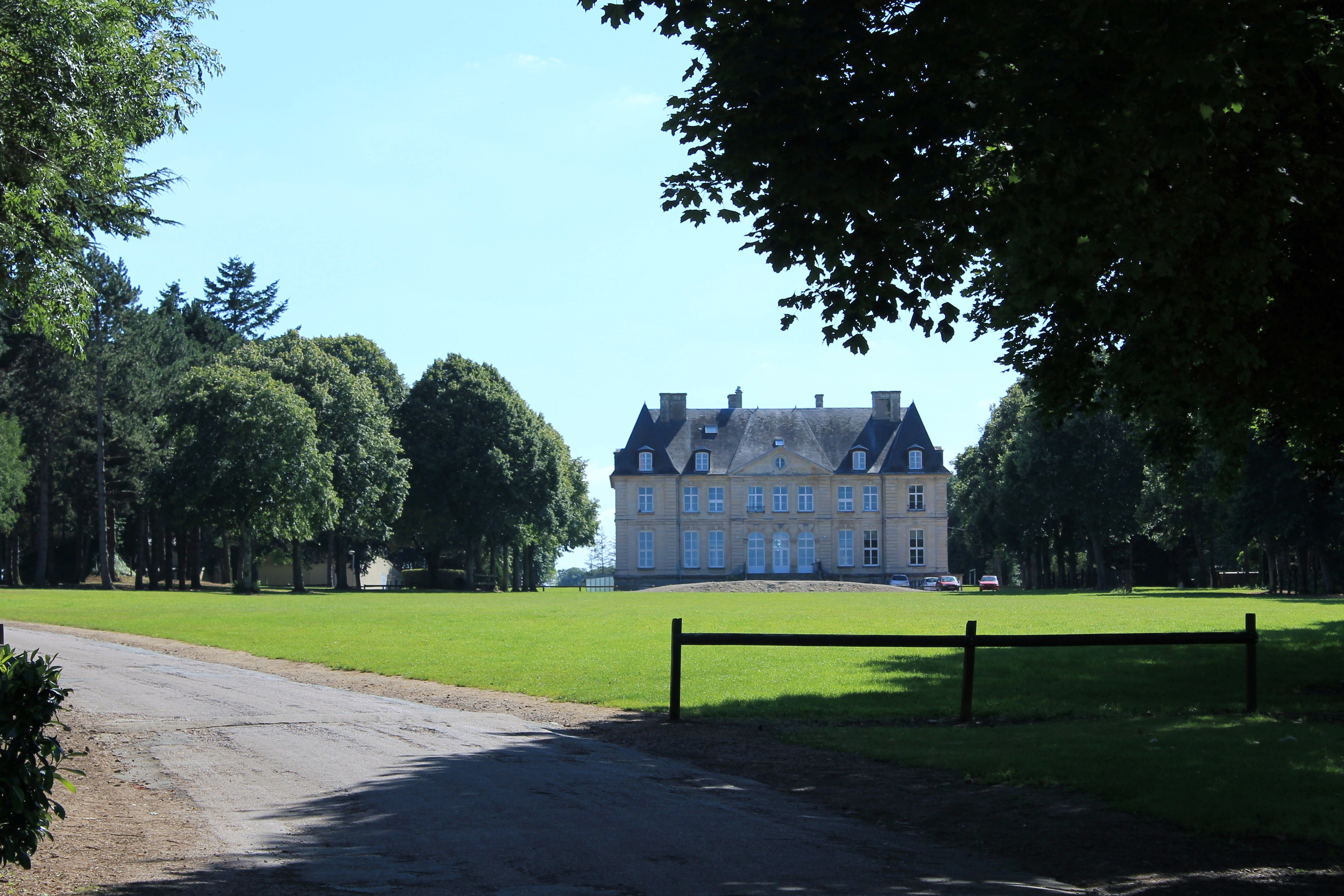
- Chateau
- Location of Maltot
- Location within France Location within Normandy
- Coordinates: 49°07′48″N 0°25′18″W
- Country: France
- Region: Normandy
- Department: Calvados
- Arrondissement: Caen
- Canton: Évrecy

Government
  - Mayor (2020–2026): Rémy Guilleux
- Area^{1}: 4.24 km^{2} (1.64 sq mi)
- Elevation: 100 m (330 ft)
- Highest elevation: 106 m (348 ft)
- Lowest elevation: 4 m (13 ft)
- Population (2023): 1,060
  - Density: 250/km^{2} (647/sq mi)
- Time zone: UTC+01:00 (CET)
  - Summer (DST): UTC+02:00 (CEST)
- INSEE/Postal code: 14396 /14930
- ^{1} French Land Register data, which excludes lakes, ponds, glaciers > 1 km^{2} (0.386 sq mi or 247 acres) and river estuaries.

Maltot (French pronunciation: [malto]) is a commune in the Calvados department in the Normandy region in northwestern France.

== Geography ==
The commune is made up of the following collection of villages and hamlets, Le Bout du Haut and Maltot.

The River Orne flows through the commune. In addition a stream the Ruisseau de Maltot traverses the commune.

== Population ==
Historical population
Year	Pop.	±% p.a.
1968	327	—
1975	337	+0.43%
1982	382	+1.81%
1990	538	+4.37%
1999	575	+0.74%
2007	781	+3.90%
2012	931	+3.58%
2017	1,036	+2.16%
2023	1,060	+0.38%
Source: INSEE

== Points of Interest ==
=== National heritage sites ===
- Eglise Saint-Jean-Baptiste - a thirteenth century church registered as a monument in 1911.

== See also ==
- Communes of the Calvados department
