= Mont Pinçon =

- Location within France

Highest point
- Elevation: 362 m (1,188 ft)
- Coordinates: 48°58′17″N 00°37′36″W

Geography
- Location: Calvados, Normandy, France
- Parent range: Armorican Massif

Mont Pinçon is the highest point of the Department of Calvados, in Normandy, with an elevation of 362 metres (1,188 ft). It is in the west of Norman Switzerland about 30 kilometres (20 mi) to the south-west of Caen, near the village of Plessis-Grimoult.

It was the site of many strategic battles in the Battle of Normandy with the Allied attack in Operation Bluecoat. In 1956, Radiodiffusion-Télévision Française (RTF, now TDF) installed a transmitter pylon over 200 metres (660 ft) high, which still serves most of the Basse-Normandie region.

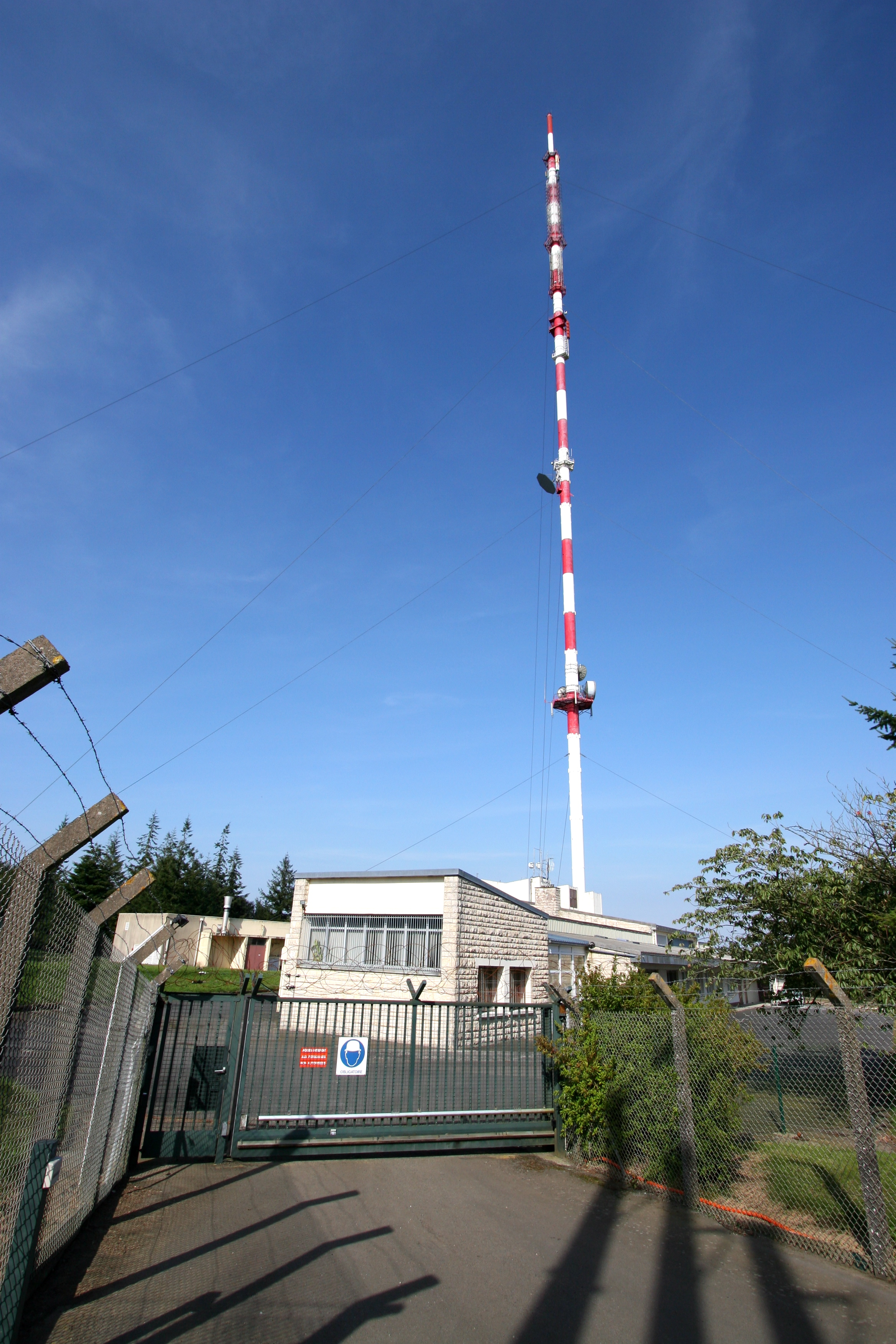
TDF installation
