= Robert Wanless O'Gowan =

British Army officer (1864–1947)

Major-General Robert Wanless O'Gowan CB CMG
- Born: 5 September 1864; Wicklow, County Wicklow, Ireland
- Died: 15 December 1947 (aged 83); Hindhead, Surrey, England
- Military career
- Allegiance: United Kingdom
- Branch: British Army
- Service years: 1886–1920
- Rank: Major-General
- Unit: Cameronians (Scottish Rifles)
- Commands: Cannock Chase Reserve Centre (1918–1920); 31st Division (1915–1918); 13th Infantry Brigade (1915)
- Conflicts: Second Boer War: Battle of Spion Kop; First World War: Battle of Hill 60; Battle of the Somme; Battle of the Ancre; Battle of Arras
- Awards: Companion of the Order of the Bath; Companion of the Order of St Michael and St George; Mentioned in dispatches (8)

Major-General Robert Wanless O'Gowan, CB, CMG (5 September 1864 – 15 December 1947) was a British Army officer who commanded the 31st Division during the First World War.

== Early military career ==
Born in County Wicklow, Ireland in September 1864, Wanless O'Gowan joined the British Army as a lieutenant in the 8th (Militia) Battalion of the King's Royal Rifle Corps (KRRC) on 13 October 1883. He transferred over to the Cameronians (Scottish Rifles), and the Regular Army, on 28 April 1886. He was promoted to captain on 19 February 1896, and served on regimental duties until the Second Boer War.

He was sent to South Africa in 1899, the year the war started, and was severely wounded in action at the Battle of Spion Kop; he later served as a railway staff officer in 1900 and 1901 before returning home with the brevet rank of major, to which he had been promoted in November 1900. During the war, he was twice mentioned in dispatches.

Following his return to the United Kingdom, he was in October 1901 appointed as the inspector of musketry in the Southern District, based in Portsmouth, Hampshire. In May 1903 he was formally confirmed in the rank of major and made deputy assistant adjutant-general (DAAG) for musketry in the North-East District before becoming an officer in charge of musketry duties in June 1905.

Having been made a lieutenant colonel in September 1909, upon his transfer to the East Lancashire Regiment, he was promoted to colonel in March 1913. In April 1914, after serving on half-pay, he became an assistant quartermaster general.

== First World War ==
In the summer of 1914, following the outbreak of the First World War, he took a staff role as assistant quartermaster-general and then assistant adjutant-general with the British Expeditionary Force (BEF). Following heavy fighting, he was assigned to the 6th Division on 1 October as its assistant adjutant general and quartermaster general (AA&QMG), succeeding Colonel Walter Campbell.

He remained in this post with the division until February 1915, handing over his post to Reginald May. O'Gowan was then promoted to temporary brigadier general and transferred to a field command, taking over the 13th Infantry Brigade, part of the 5th Division, from Colonel Edward Cooper. The brigade was temporarily attached to the 28th Division at this time, and involved in defending against a heavy German attack at St. Eloi on 14 March, and the successful attack on Hill 60 in mid-April.

For his wartime leadership, he was appointed a Companion of the Order of the Bath (CB) in the 1915 Birthday Honours.

In August, he was promoted to the temporary rank of major general and returned to England to succeed Major General Edward Fanshawe in command of the newly formed 31st Division. This was a Kitchener's Army formation predominantly drawn from the industrial towns of Northern England, with its infantry mainly composed of close-knit "Pals battalions". O'Gowan would command the division until 1918, during which time it saw brief service in Egypt before returning to the Western Front in early 1916.

On the first day of the Battle of the Somme on 1 July 1916, the division was assigned to capture Serre on the flank of the main assault and guard against counter-attacks; however, the attacking battalions were decimated by German machine-guns before crossing no-man's land, with only small groups surviving to reach the far trenches. Some small parties reached their objectives, including one group inside Serre itself, but they had no support from reserves and were destroyed. The division lost 3,593 officers and men killed, wounded, or missing, with only eight men from the attacking waves surviving to be taken as prisoners of war. Some battalions had a casualty rate of over 80%.

The division did not see further heavy fighting, other than routine trench garrisons, until November, when it fought at the Battle of the Ancre.

In the spring of 1917 it fought under Wanless-O'Gowan's command with more success at the Battle of Arras.

In April 1918 he returned to England to assume command of the Cannock Chase Reserve Centre, taking over from Major General Richard Hutton Davies, who had been relieved due to severe physical and mental illness, and was allowed to retain his temporary major general's rank.

== Postwar and final years ==
He remained at Cannock Chase until February 1920, fifteen months after the war had ended due to the Armistice with Germany, when the centre was closed after demobilisation and he retired from the army.

He lived throughout the Second World War and died in December 1947 at the age of 83.
