= Owen Jones (British Army officer) =

British Army general

Brigadier-General Owen Jones DSO
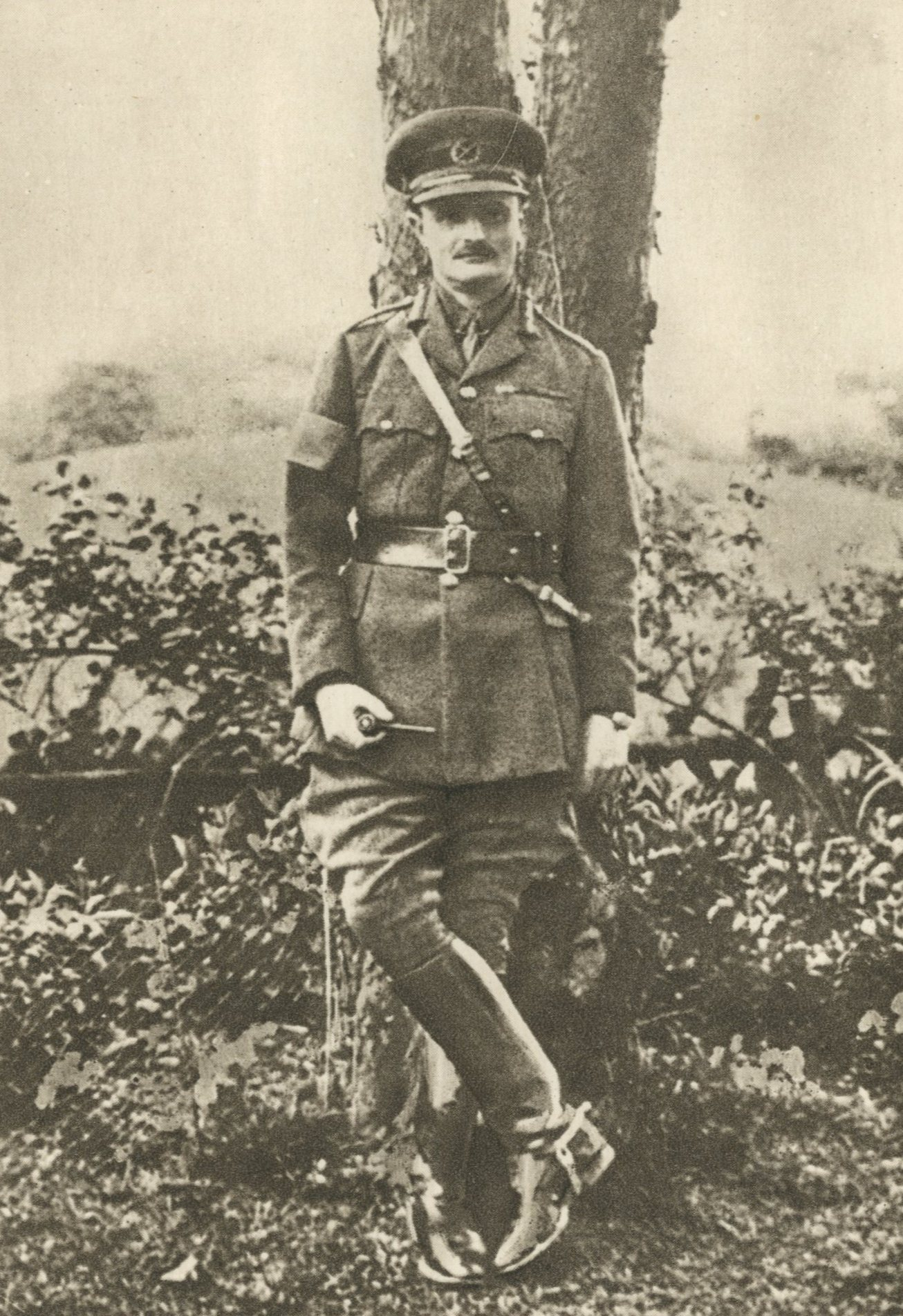
- Born: 1 December 1876; Llandyssil, Montgomeryshire, Wales
- Died: 14 September 1918 (aged 41); France
- Burial place: Bagneux British Cemetery
- Military career
- Allegiance: United Kingdom
- Branch: British Army
- Rank: Brigadier-General
- Unit: Essex Regiment
- Commands: 13th Brigade
- Conflicts: First World War: Western Front
- Awards: Distinguished Service Order; Chevalier of the Legion of Honour

Brigadier General Lumley Owen Williames Jones, DSO (1 December 1876 – 14 September 1918) was the last British General officer to die on the Somme.

== Early life ==
Born on 1 December 1876 in Llandyssil, Montgomeryshire, Wales, Jones was the son of Richard and Catherine Jones of Cefn Bryntalch. He was educated at Winchester College from 1890 to 1895.

== Military career ==
In 1895, Jones was commissioned as a second lieutenant in the 4th Battalion, South Wales Borderers, a militia unit. He was promoted to lieutenant in the militia on 11 December 1895. He passed the competitive examination of militia subalterns in 1997. He was promoted to lieutenant in the Essex Regiment, British Army, on 4 February 1900. He served in South Africa from 1901 to 1902, during the Second Boer War, and was awarded the Queen's South Africa Medal with four clasps. From 1904 to 1908, he served with the West Africa Frontier Force.

He had started the First World War as a captain in the 2nd Battalion, Essex Regiment and took part in nearly every battle on the Western Front. On 8 October 1914, he was serving as adjutant of the 2nd Battalion when he was mentioned in despatches. On 2 November 1915, he succeeded Charles Maynard as general officer commanding (GOC) of a brigade and was granted the temporary rank of brigadier general while employed in this role. In June 1916, he was made a brevet lieutenant colonel.

By 1918 he reached the temporary rank of brigadier general and was commander of the 13th Brigade. He was also made a Companion of the Distinguished Service Order (DSO), Chevalier of the Legion of Honour (France) and Officer of the Order of Saints Maurice and Lazarus (Italy).

Jones contracted Spanish flu and died of pneumonia on 14 September 1918, aged 41, in a clearing station in Gézaincourt, Somme, France. He was buried at the Bagneux British Cemetery at Gezaincourt. He was the last of 12 British general officers to die within the Somme.

== See also ==
- List of generals of the British Empire who died during the First World War
