= 58th (2/1st London) Division =

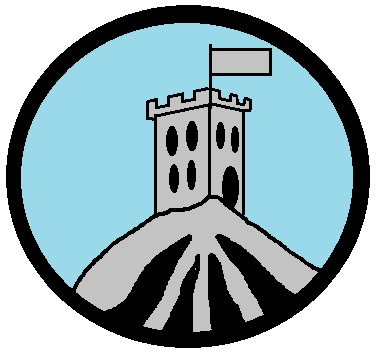
- Active: 1914–1919; 1943–1945
- Country: United Kingdom
- Branch: Territorial Force
- Type: Infantry
- Size: Division
- Engagements: First World War: Arras; Passchendaele; German spring offensive Amiens; Hundred Days Offensive; Second World War: Operation Fortitude

Commanders
- Notable commanders: Maj-Gen H.D. Fanshawe; Maj-Gen A.B.E. Cator; Maj-Gen N.M. Smyth, VC

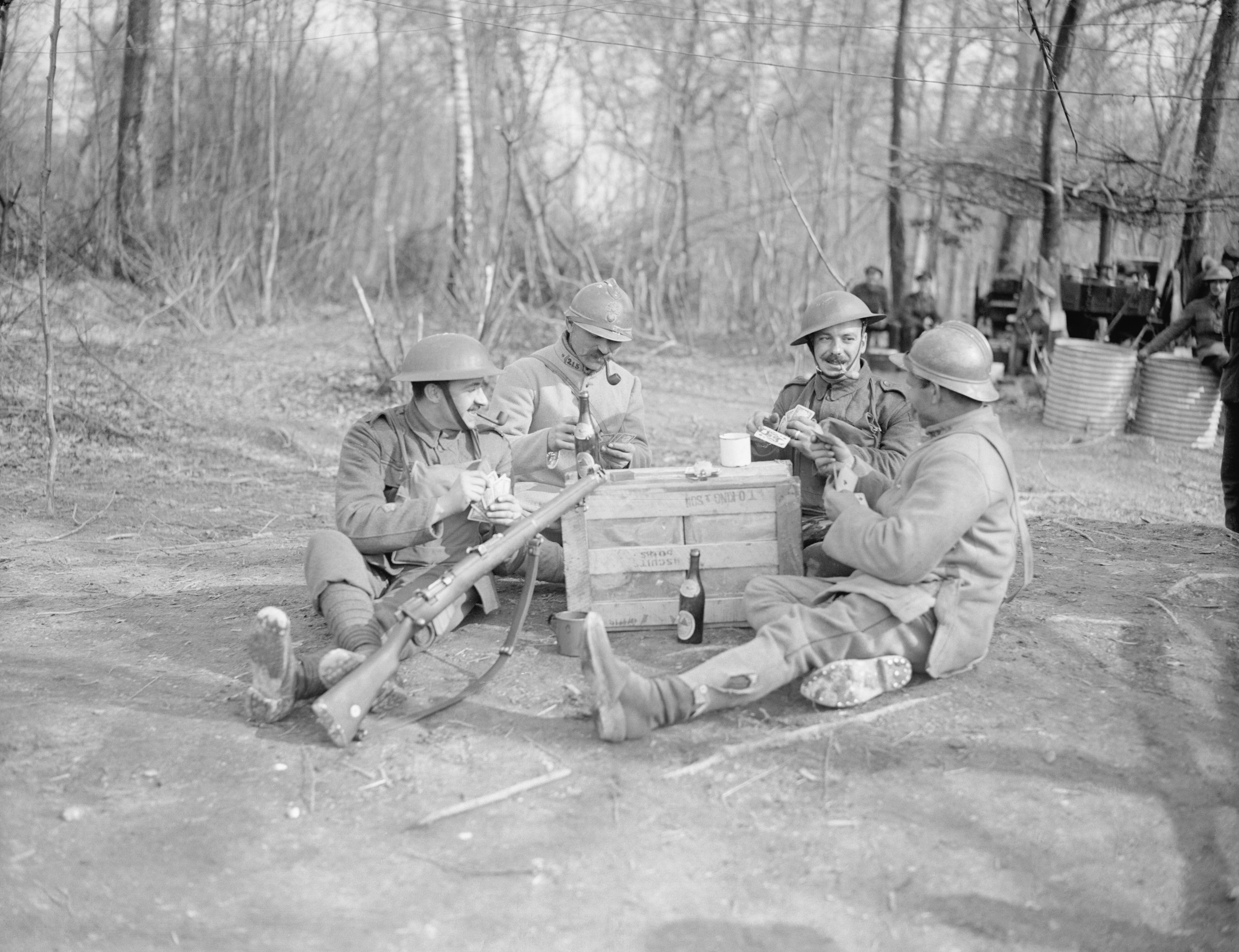
French and British soldiers of the 58th Division playing cards at Bernagousse, near Barisis on the extreme of the newly extended British line, 16 March 1918

The 58th (2/1st London) Division was an infantry division created in 1915 as part of the massive expansion of the British Army during the First World War. It was a 2nd Line Territorial Force formation raised as a duplicate of the 56th (1/1st London) Division. After training in Britain, the division joined the British Expeditionary Force (BEF) on the Western Front in 1917. It saw action at the battles of Arras and Passchedaele in 1917 and the German spring offensive in 1918. It then took part in the Battle of Amiens and the final Allied Hundred Days Offensive of the war. The division was recreated during the Second World War, as an imaginary deception formation.

== Origin ==
The formation of reserve or 2nd Line TF units was authorised by the War Office on 31 August 1914. At first they comprised those members of the pre-war parent unit who had not volunteered for or were unfit for overseas service, who trained the flood of volunteers who came forward. Later, the 2nd Line formations were also prepared for overseas service and 3rd Line units were formed to provide replacements. In the case of the 2/1st London Division, this process began early, when the 2/1st London Brigade went to Malta in December 1914 to relieve its 1st Line counterpart that had been despatched there on the outbreak of war. It was replaced in the 2/1st London Division by its 3rd Line (the battalions were renumbered when the original 2nd Line battalions were disbanded in 1916). The artillery, engineers and two infantry battalions of the 1/1st London Division had not gone overseas, and these were attached to the 2/1st Division for the first year of its existence.

== Training ==
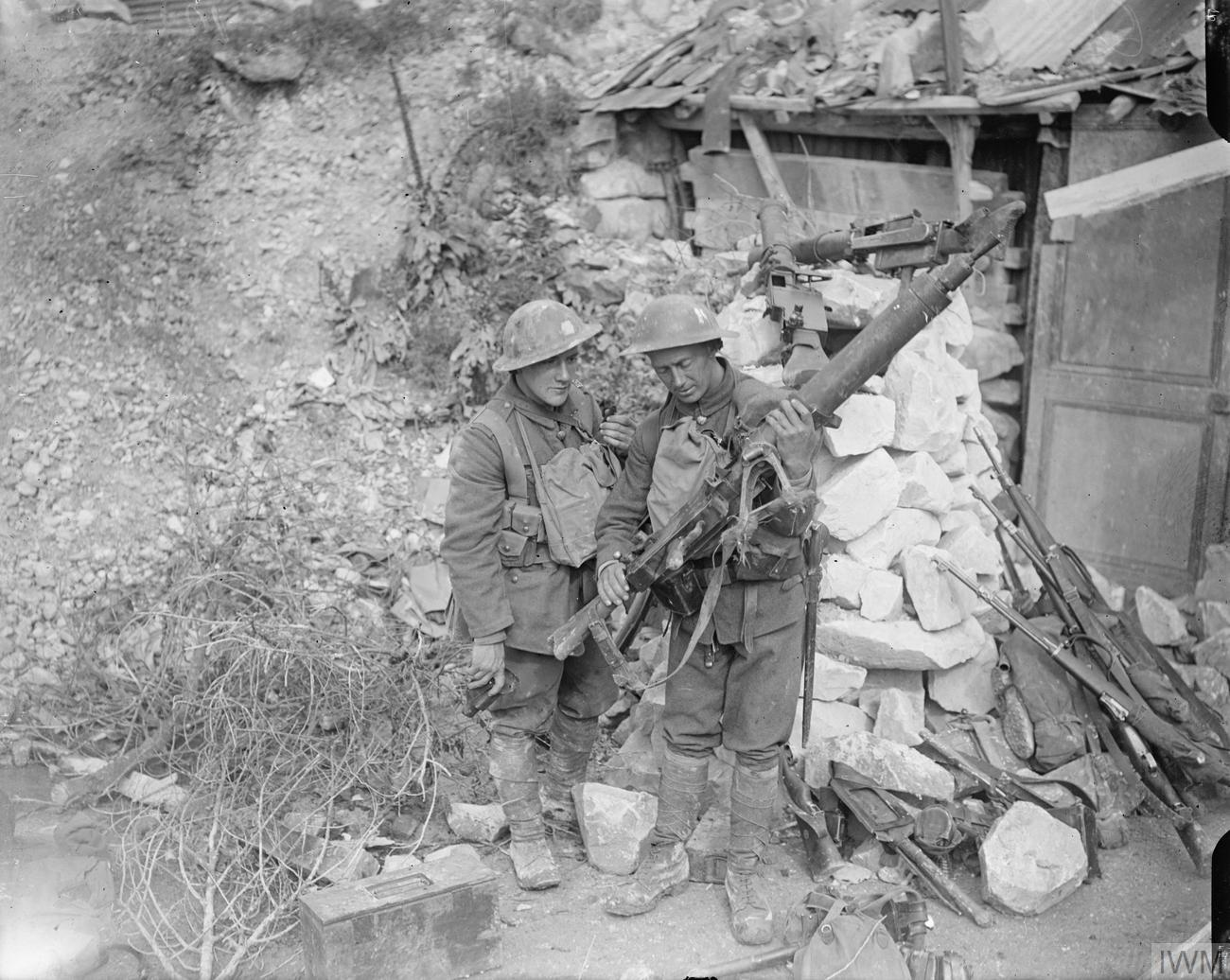
Battle of Amiens. Soldiers of the 8th Battalion, London Regiment (Post Office Rifles) examining captured German machine guns. Near Malard Wood, 8 August 1918.

In August 1915, the division concentrated around Ipswich in Eastern England and received the number 58, its brigades being numbered 173–5. Here it formed part of First Army in Central Force. In September 1915 the 1st Line artillery brigades went to France and were replaced by the division's own 2nd Line units. In the Spring of 1916 the division took over a sector of the East Coast defences. Then in July 1916 it went to Sutton Veny on Salisbury Plain for final training before deploying overseas. The artillery were now equipped with modern 18-pounder field guns and 4.5-inch howitzers while the infantry had been issued with the .303 Lee-Enfield service rifle in place of the .256-in Japanese Ariska rifles with which they had done their early training.

The division began embarking for France on 20 January 1917 and had concentrated by 8 February. It then served for the remainder of the war on the Western Front.

== Order of battle ==
The division had the following composition during the war:

=== 2/1st London Brigade ===
Brigade left to relieve 1/1st London Brigade at Malta between December 1914 and February 1915

- 2/1st (City of London) Battalion, London Regiment (Royal Fusiliers)
- 2/2nd (City of London) Battalion, London Regiment (Royal Fusiliers)
- 2/3rd (City of London) Battalion, London Regiment (Royal Fusiliers)
- 2/4th (City of London) Battalion, London Regiment (Royal Fusiliers)

=== 173rd (3/1st London) Brigade ===
Formed in April 1915

- 3/1st (City of London) Bn, London Regiment (Royal Fusiliers) – became 2/1st Bn in June 1916; disbanded January 1918 and drafted to 2/2nd, 2/3rd, 2/4th and 1/4th Bns
- 3/2nd (City of London) Bn, London Regiment (Royal Fusiliers) – became 2/2nd Bn in June 1916
- 3/3rd (City of London) Bn, London Regiment (Royal Fusiliers) – became 2/3rd Bn in June 1916; amalgamated with 1/3rd Bn from 56th (1/1st London) Division January 1918 and became 3rd Bn
- 3/4th (City of London) Bn, London Regiment (Royal Fusiliers) – became 2/4th Bn in June 1916; absorbed by 2/2nd Bn September 1918
- 2/24th (County of London) Bn, London Regiment (The Queen's) – joined September 1918 from 60th (2/2nd London) Division in Palestine
- 214th Coy, Machine Gun Corps MGC – joined March 1917; to 58th Bn, MGC, March 1918
- 173rd Trench Mortar Battery (TMB) – formed before embarkation in January 1917

=== 174th (2/2nd London) Brigade ===
- 2/5th (City of London) Bn, London Regiment (London Rifle Brigade) – disbanded January 1918 and drafted to 1/18th, 1/28th and 2/10th Bns
- 2/6th (City of London) Bn, London Regiment (City of London Rifles) – amalgamated with 1/6th Bn from 47th (1/2nd London) Division January 1918 and became 6th Bn
- 2/7th (City of London) Bn, London Regiment – amalgamated with 1/7th Bn from 47th (1/2nd London) Division January 1918 and became 7th Bn
- 2/8th (City of London) Bn, London Regiment (Post Office Rifles) – amalgamated with 1/8th Bn from 47th (1/2nd London) Division January 1918 and became 8th Bn
- 198th Coy, MGC – joined from 12th (Eastern) Division March 1917; to 58th Bn, MGC, March 1918
- 174th TMB – formed before embarkation in January 1917

=== 175th (2/3rd London) Brigade ===
- 2/9th (County of London) Bn, London Regiment (Queen Victoria's Rifles) – amalgamated with 1/9th Bn from 56th (1/1st London) Division January 1918 and became 9th Bn
- 2/10th (County of London) Bn, London Regiment (Hackney)
- 2/11th (County of London) Bn, London Regiment (Finsbury Rifles) – disbanded January 1918 and drafted to 1/20th, 1/21st and 1/22nd Bns
- 2/12th (County of London) Bn, London Regiment (The Rangers) – amalgamated with 1/12th Bn from 56th (1/1st London) Division January 1918 and became 12th Bn
- 44th Coy, MGC – attached from 15th (Scottish) Division 23 February–22 March 1917
- 215th Coy, MGC – joined March 1917; to 58th Bn, MGC, March 1918
- 175th TMB – formed before embarkation in January 1917

=== Support Troops ===
Mounted Troops

- Duke of Lancaster's Own Yeomanry (less A Squadron) – left early 1915
- A Squadron, 1/Hampshire Carabiniers – joined March 1916, left January 1917
- Wessex Divisional Cyclist Company, Army Cyclist Corps – remained in UK
- 1/1st Kent Cyclist Bn, ACC – joined October, left December 1915

Artillery

- 1/I City of London Brigade, Royal Field Artillery (RFA) – joined from 1st London Division; left September 1915
- 1/II County of London Brigade, RFA – joined from 1st London Division; left September 1915
- 1/III County of London Brigade, RFA – joined from 1st London Division; left September 1915
- 1/IV County of London (Howitzer) Brigade, RFA – joined from 1st London Division; left September 1915
- CCXC (2/I City of London) Brigade, RFA – joined September 1915
- CCXCI (2/II County of London) Brigade, RFA – joined September 1915
- CCXCIII (2/III County of London) Brigade, RFA – joined September 1915; left on arrival in France
  - 1/Glamorganshire Royal Horse Artillery (RHA) – joined August 1916
  - 1/Shropshire RHA – joined August 1916
- 2/IV County of London (Howitzer) Brigade, RFA – joined September 1915; broken up between 2/I and 2/II Bdes in July 1916
- 1/1st London Heavy Battery, Royal Garrison Artillery (RGA) – joined from 1st London Division; left 11 February 1916
- 2/1st London Heavy Battery, RGA – joined September 1915; remained in UK
- 58th Divisional Trench Mortar Brigade – formed December 1916 from Shropshire and Glamorgan RHA Ammunition Columns and other volunteers
  - V.58 Heavy TMB
  - X.58 Medium TMB
  - Y.58 Medium TMB
  - Z.58 Medium TMB
- 58th (2/1st London) Divisional Ammunition Column, RFA

58th Divisional Engineers

- 2/1st London Field Company, Royal Engineers (RE) – rejoined 56th (1st London) Division February 1916
- 2/2nd London Field Co, RE – rejoined 56th (1st London) Division February 1916
- 511th (1/5th London) Field Co, RE – joined November 1915
- 503rd (2/1st Wessex) Field Co, RE – joined from 45th (2nd Wessex) Division February 1916
- 504th (2/2nd Wessex) Field Co, RE – joined from 45th (2nd Wessex) Division February 1916
- 1/1st London Signal Co, RE – rejoined 56th (1st London) Division February 1916
- 58th (2/1st Wessex) Signal Co, RE – joined from 45th (2nd Wessex) Division February 1916

Pioneers

- 4th Bn Suffolk Regiment – joined February 1918 from 33rd Division

Machine Guns

- 206th Co, MGC – joined March 1917
- 58th Bn, MGC – formed March 1918 from 214th, 198th, 215th and 206th Cos
- 100th (Warwickshire & South Nottinghamshire Yeomanry) Bn, MGC – attached 7–25 September 1918

Medical

- 2/1st London Field Ambulance, Royal Army Medical Corps (RAMC) – rejoined 56th (1st London) Division February 1916
- 2/2nd London Field Ambulance, RAMC – rejoined 56th (1st London) Division February 1916
- 2/3rd London Field Ambulance, RAMC – rejoined 56th (1st London) Division February 1916
- 2/1st Home Counties Field Ambulance, RAMC – joined from 67th (2nd Home Counties) Division February 1916
- 2/2nd Home Counties Field Ambulance, RAMC – joined from 67th (2nd Home Counties) Division February 1916
- 2/3rd Home Counties Field Ambulance, RAMC – joined from 67th (2nd Home Counties) Division February 1916
- 58th Sanitary Section – left to take over No 8 Sanitary Area, VIII Corps, 30 March 1917

Veterinary

- 58th (2/1st London) Mobile Veterinary Section, Army Veterinary Corps – joined November 1915

Labour

- 249th Divisional Employment Co, Labour Corps – formed June 1917

Supply

- 58th (2/1st London) Divisional Train, Army Service Corps (ASC)
  - 509th Horse Transport Co, ASC
  - 510th Horse Transport Co, ASC
  - 511th Horse Transport Co, ASC
  - 512th Horse Transport Co, ASC

Attached

- 1/10th (County of London) Bn, London Regiment (Hackney) – joined from 1st London Division; left April 1915
- 1/11th (County of London) Bn, London Regiment (Finsbury Rifles) – joined from 1st London Division; left April 1915

== Actions ==
The division was engaged in the following actions:

1917

- German Retreat to the Hindenburg Line (17–28 March)
- Battle of Arras
  - 2nd Battle of Bullecourt (4–17 May) – 175 Bde with 2nd Australian Division, 173 Bde with 5th Australian Division
- Actions of the Hindenburg Line (20 May–16 June)
- 3rd Battle of Ypres
  - Battle of the Menin Road Ridge (20–25 September)
  - Battle of Polygon Wood (26–27 September)
  - Second Battle of Passchendaele (26 October– 10 November)

1918

- German spring offensive (21 March–3 April)
  - Battle of St Quentin (21–23 March)
  - Battle of the Avre (4 April) – 6th and 7th Bn Londons attached to 18th (Eastern) Division
  - Second Battle of Villers-Bretonneux (24–25 April)
- Battle of Amiens (8–11 August)
- Second Battle of the Somme
  - Battle of Albert (22–23 August)
  - Second Battle of Bapaume (31 August–1 September)
- Battle of Épehy (18 September)
- Final advance in Artois and Flanders (2 October–11 November)

== Demobilisation ==
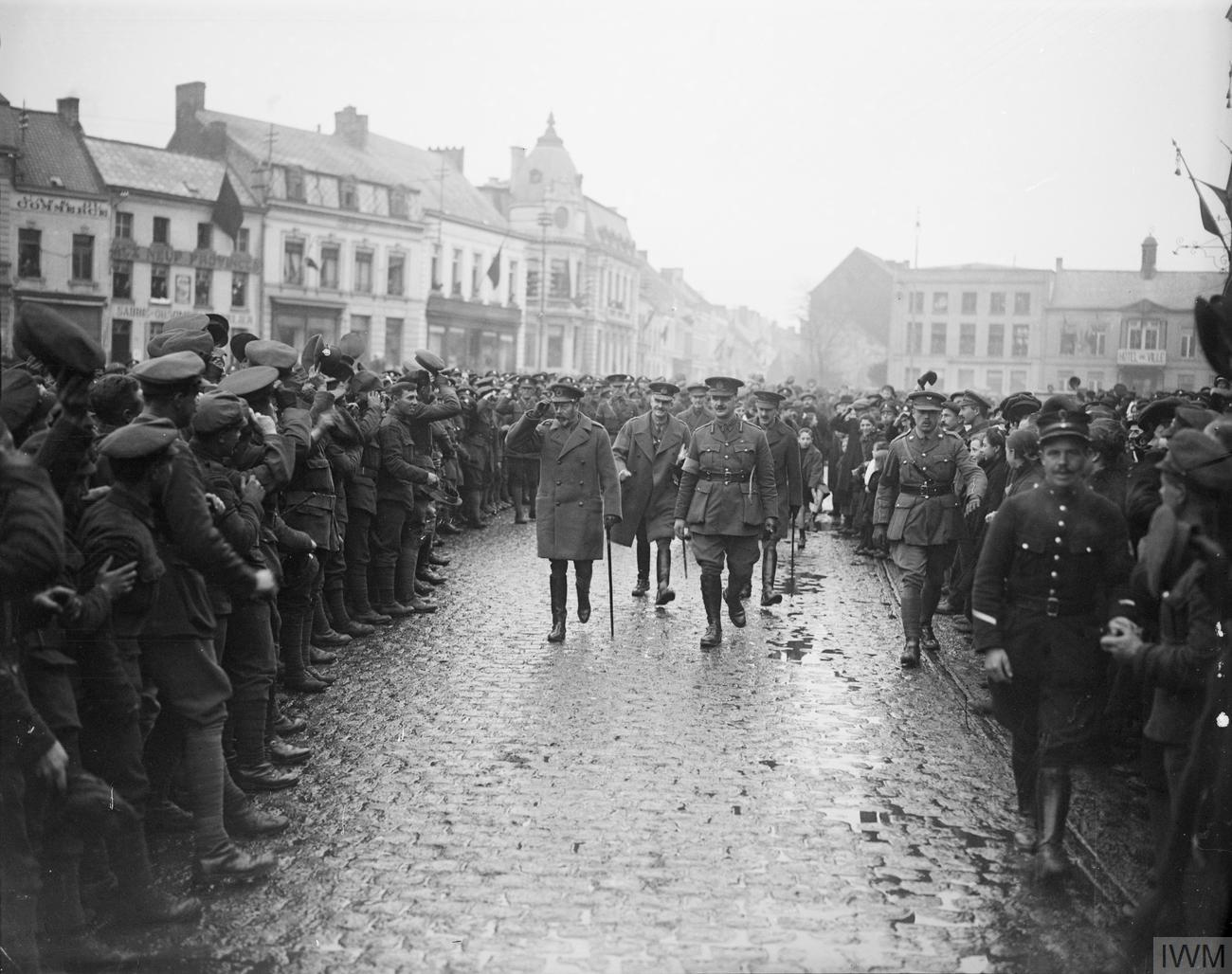
King George V with Edward, Prince of Wales, Prince Albert, and General Sir Henry Horne walking through Stambruges, 5 December 1918. Here the 175th Brigade was drawn up, under temporary command of Lieutenant Colonel Evelyn George Powell of the Grenadier Guards.

After the Armistice with Germany the division was billeted in the area of Peruwelz in Belgium. Skilled tradesmen and 'pivotal' men began to be demobilised during December 1918, and by March 1919 the division had dwindled to a brigade group concentrated around Leuze as units were reduced to cadres. The artillery left for the UK on 4 April, and the last units left France at the end of June, when 58th Division ceased to exist.

== General Officers Commanding ==
The following officers commanded the division:

- Brig-Gen E.J. Cooper, appointed 4 May 1915
- Maj-Gen H.D. Fanshawe, appointed 5 September 1916
- Maj-Gen A.B.E. Cator, appointed 6 October 1917; sick 10 May 1918
- Brig-Gen C.G. Higgins, acting 10–21 May, 10–13 June 1918
- Maj-Gen N.M. Smyth, VC, appointed 21 May; sick 10 June 1918
- Maj-Gen F. W. Ramsay, appointed 13 June 1918

== Second World War ==
The division was 'reformed' as a 'phantom division' created as part of 'Operation Fortitude North' as a replacement for the 3rd Infantry Division which was going south to take part in a D-Day rehearsal. Unlike other 'phantom divisions' the 58th's number was chosen on the basis of Ultra reports that showed the Germans believed a 58th Infantry Division existed in the vicinity of Windsor. This misidentification was then supported by simulated radio traffic and by fictitious reports from double agents working for the British Security Service, MI5.

As part of the Fourth Army's II Corps, the division took the role of a mountain trained assault formation in 'Fortitude North' (HQ: Aberlour) and the role of follow up unit in 'Fortitude South' (HQ: Gravesend). It was disposed of by announcing that the division had moved to Hertfordshire and been disbanded in April 1945.

The formation's insignia, a stag's face full on a black square was chosen to support the division's fictional back-story, that it had been formed in the Scottish Highlands around cadres from combat experienced Highland regiments.

Imaginary formations assigned to the division included the 173rd Infantry Brigade, 174th Infantry Brigade, 175th Infantry Brigade, and support units.

== See also ==
- List of British divisions in World War I
- List of British divisions in World War II

== Bibliography ==
- Anon, (2002) Short History of the London Rifle Brigade, Aldershot: Gale & Polden, 1916//Uckfield: Naval & Military Press, ISBN 1-84342-365-0.
- Barnes, Maj R. Money (1963) The Soldiers of London, London: Seeley Service.
- Becke, Maj A.F. History of the Great War: Order of Battle of Divisions, Part 2b: The 2nd-Line Territorial Force Divisions (57th–69th), with the Home-Service Divisions (71st–73rd) and 74th and 75th Divisions, London: HM Stationery Office, 1937/Uckfield: Naval & Military Press, 2007, ISBN 1-847347-39-8.
- Godfrey, Capt E.G. The "Cast Iron Sixth": A History of the Sixth Battalion London Regiment (The City of London Rifles), London: Old Comrades' Association, 1935//Uckfield: Naval & Military Press, 2002, ISBN 1-84342-170-4.
- Grey, Maj W.E. 2nd City of London Regiment (Royal Fusiliers) in the Great War 1914–19, Westminster: Regimental HQ, 1929/Uckfield: Naval & Military Press, 2002, ISBN 978-1-843423-69-0
- Grimwade, Capt F. Clive The War History of the 4th Battalion The London Regiment (Royal Fusiliers) 1914–1919, London: Regimental Headquarters, 1922/Uckfield, Naval & Military press, 2002, ISBN 978-1-843423-63-8.
- Harrison, Derek; Duckers, Peter (2006) Shropshire Royal Horse Artillery 1908–1920, Shrewsbury: Kingswood/Shropshire Regimental Museum.
- Hesketh, Roger (1999) Fortitude: The D-Day Deception Campaign, St Ermine, ISBN 0316851728.
- Holt, Thaddeus (2005) The Deceivers: Allied Military Deception in the Second World War, Phoenix, ISBN 0753819171.
- Keeson, Maj C.A. Cuthbert The History and Records of Queen Victoria's Rifles 1792–1922, London: Constable, 1923//Uckfield: Naval & Military Press, 2002, ASIN B00NPNKEZA
- Levine, Joshua (2011) Operation Fortitude: The Greatest Hoax of the Second World War, London: Collins, ISBN 978-0-00-739587-3.
- Martin, David E. (2014). Londoners on the Western Front: The 58th (2/1st London) Division on the Great War. Pen and Sword Books. ISBN 978-1-78159-180-2.
- Martin, Lt-Col H.R. Historical Record of the London Regiment, 2nd Edn (nd)
- Planck, C. Digby The Shiny Seventh: History of the 7th (City of London) Battalion London Regiment, London: Old Comrades' Association, 1946/Uckfield: Naval & Military Press, 2002, ISBN 1-84342-366-9.
