= 13th Infantry Brigade (United Kingdom) =

13th Brigade 13th Infantry Brigade
- Active: 1914−1918; 1939−1945
- Country: United Kingdom
- Branch: British Army
- Type: Infantry
- Size: Brigade
- Engagements: First World War; Second World War

Commanders
- Notable commanders: Charles Monro; Thompson Capper; William Hickie; Alfred Reade Godwin-Austen; Miles Dempsey; Douglas Wimberley; Lorne MacLaine Campbell

The 13th Infantry Brigade was a regular infantry brigade of the British Army that saw active service during both the First and the Second World Wars.

== First World War ==
The 13th Brigade was temporarily under the command of 28th Division between 23 February and 7 April 1915, when it was replaced by 84th Brigade from that Division and moved to the regular 5th Division. It served on the Western Front for most of the war except for a brief period in Italy.

=== Order of battle ===
Component units included:

- 2nd Battalion, King's Own Scottish Borderers
- 2nd Battalion, Duke of Wellington's (West Riding Regiment) (left January 1916)
- 1st Battalion, Queen's Own (Royal West Kent Regiment)
- 2nd Battalion, King's Own (Yorkshire Light Infantry) (left December 1915)
- 1/9th (City of London) Battalion, London Regiment (joined November 1914, left February 1915)
- 14th (Service) Battalion, Royal Warwickshire Regiment (joined December 1915, became Divisional Pioneers October 1918)
- 15th (Service) Battalion, Royal Warwickshire Regiment (joined January 1916, disbanded October 1918)
- 16th (Service) Battalion, Royal Warwickshire Regiment (joined October 1918)

== Second World War ==
The brigade was sent to France in mid-September 1939, initially as an independent formation, where it became part of the British Expeditionary Force.

After the retreat from France the brigade re-formed in the United Kingdom. In April–May 1942 13th Brigade, after leaving the United Kingdom along with the rest of the division, was involved in the landings on Vichy held French Madagascar in 1942.

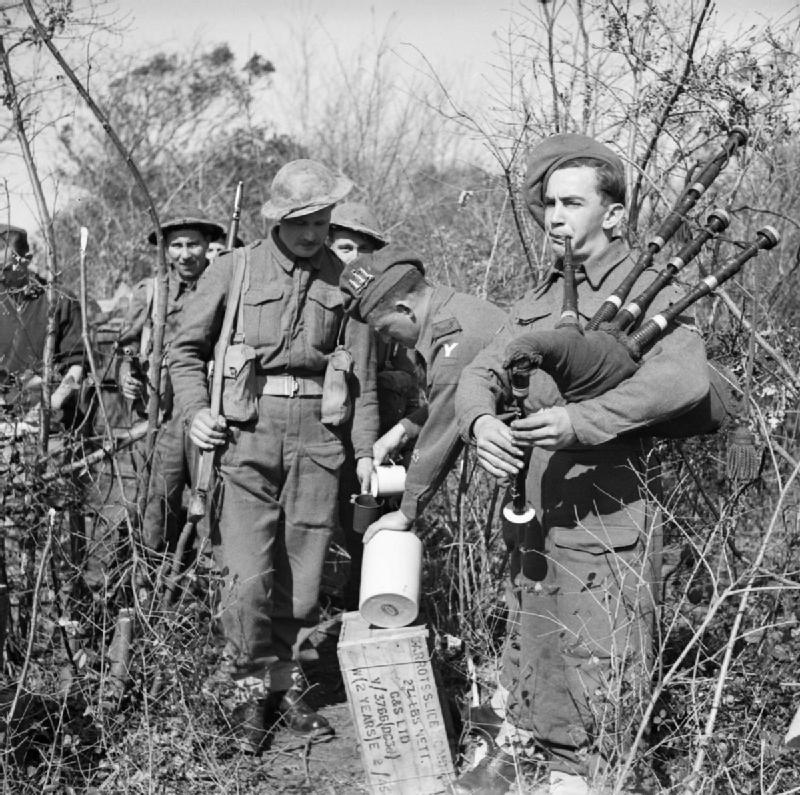
While a piper plays, a special rum ration is issued to men of the 2nd Battalion, Royal Inniskilling Fusiliers to mark St Patrick's Day in the Anzio beachhead, Italy, 17 March 1944.

The brigade, with the rest of 5th Infantry Division, fought in the Allied invasion of Sicily and the Italian Campaign where Sergeant Maurice Albert Windham Rogers of the 2nd Battalion, Wiltshire Regiment was posthumously awarded the Victoria Cross in 1944, the first and only VC to be awarded to the brigade and division during the Second World War.

In 1945 the 5th Infantry Division was transferred to the British Second Army participate in the final stages of the North West Europe Campaign where they invaded Germany.

The brigade was part of the 5th Division throughout the Second World War.

=== Order of battle ===
The 13th Brigade was constituted as follows during the war:

- 2nd Battalion, Cameronians (Scottish Rifles)
- 2nd Battalion, Royal Inniskilling Fusiliers (until 28 September 1939, rejoined 30 November 1939, left 14 July 1944)
- 2nd Battalion, Wiltshire Regiment
- 13th Infantry Brigade Anti-Tank Company (disbanded 6 January 1941)
- 13th Infantry Brigade Special Company (from 4 May 1943 until 20 June 1944)
- 5th Battalion, Essex Regiment (from 14 July 1944)

Between 23 April and 19 May 1942 the following units were under command of the brigade for operations in Madagascar:

- 91st Field Regiment, Royal Artillery
- 252nd Field Company, Royal Engineers
- 13th Infantry Brigade Company, Royal Army Service Corps
- 164th Field Ambulance, Royal Army Medical Corps

== Commanders ==
The following officers commanded the 13th Brigade during its existence:

- Major-General William F. Vetch: June 1902-June 1906
- Major-General Henry M. Lawson: June 1906-May 1907
- Brigadier-General Charles C. Monro: May 1907-January 1911
- Brigadier-General Thompson Capper: February 1911-February 1914
- Brigadier-General Gerald J. Cuthbert: February–October 1914
- Brigadier-General William B. Hickie: 1 October 1914
- Colonel A. Martyn: 13 October 1914 (acting)
- Lieutenant-Colonel W. M. Withycombe: 7 November 1914 (acting)
- Brigadier-General Edward J. Cooper: 3 December 1914-February 1915
- Lieutenant-Colonel L. J. Bols: 1 February 1915 (acting)
- Brigadier-General Robert Wanless O'Gowan: 8 February–August 1915
- Brigadier-General Charles C. M. Maynard: 21 August–31 August 1915
- Colonel P. M. Robinson: 31 August 1915 (acting)
- Brigadier-General Charles C. M. Maynard: 18 September 1915
- Lieutenant-Colonel E. S. D'E. Coke: 23 October 1915 (acting)
- Brigadier-General Lumley O. W. Jones: 2 November 1915-16 November 1917
- Lieutenant-Colonel L. Murray: 16 November 1917 (acting)
- Brigadier-General Lumley O. W. Jones: 18 December 1917
- Lieutenant-Colonel C. T. Furber: 8 September 1918 (acting)
- Lieutenant-Colonel J. W. C. Kirk: 15 September 1918 (acting)
- Brigadier-General Arthur T. Beckwith: 21 September 1918 – 1919
- Brigadier-General T.Stanton Lambert: October 1919-June 1921
- Brigadier William A. Blake: December 1926-December 1930
- Brigadier David Forster: December 1930-December 1934
- Brigadier John H.T. Priestman: December 1934-September 1938
- Brigadier A. Reade Godwin-Austen: September 1938-January 1939
- Brigadier Henry B.D. Willcox: January–November 1939
- Brigadier Miles C. Dempsey: November 1939-July 1940
- Brigadier Douglas N. Wimberley: July–September 1940
- Brigadier Valentine C. Russell: September 1940-May 1943
- Brigadier Lorne M. Campbell: May 1943-September 1944
- Brigadier Francis R.G. Matthews: September–November 1944
- Brigadier William H. Lambert: November 1944-August 1945
- Brigadier Robert W.M. de Winton: August 1945-February 1947

== Sources ==
- Joslen, H. F. (2003) [1960]. Orders of Battle: Second World War, 1939–1945. Uckfield, East Sussex: Naval and Military Press. ISBN 978-1-84342-474-1.
