= Tower Hamlets Engineers =

British Army unit

Tower Hamlets Engineer Volunteers 56th Divisional Engineers 58th Divisional Engineers 18th (London) GHQ Troops RE 114 (1st London) Army Engineer Regiment
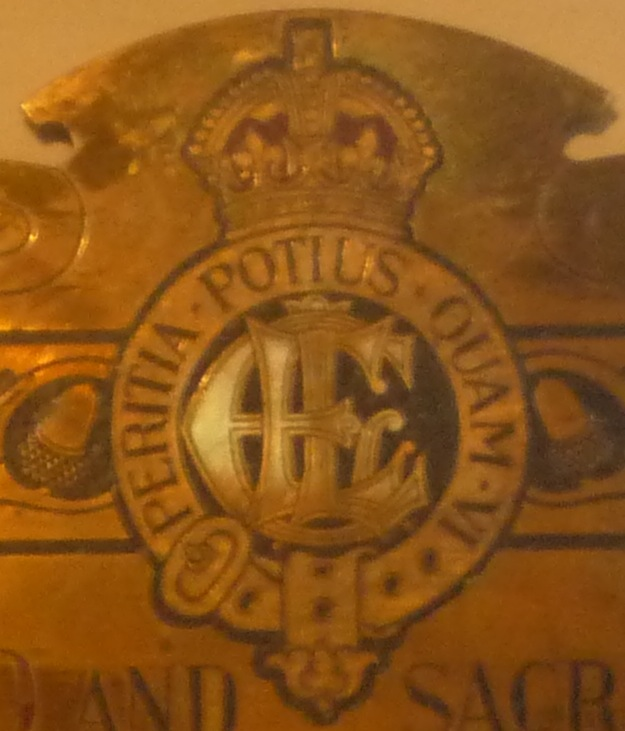
- Badge of the East London Engineers from the Boer War memorial in St John on Bethnal Green. The Latin motto translates as 'Skill rather than force'.
- Active: 1868–
- Country: United Kingdom
- Branch: Territorial Force
- Type: Field engineers
- Part of: 56th (1/1st London) Division; 58th (2/1st London) Division
- Garrison/HQ: Bethnal Green; Holloway; Ilford
- Motto: Peritia Potius Quam VI [Skill Rather Than Force]
- Engagements: Second Boer War; World War I: Gommecourt; Arras; Passchendaele; Cambrai; German spring offensive; Amiens; Hundred Days Offensive; Sensée Canal; World War II: Siege of Tobruk; D-day; Operation Goodwood; Rhine crossing

The Tower Hamlets Engineers was a Volunteer unit of the British Royal Engineers (RE) based in East London. Raised in 1868, it provided engineers for two London infantry divisions of the Territorial Force during World War I. In World War II, it operated as an RE headquarters, particularly on D-Day and at the Rhine Crossing, while its subordinate companies served in a number of campaigns, including the Siege of Tobruk and with the Chindits. Its successor unit continues to serve in today's Army Reserve.

The unit took its name from the historic Tower Hamlets (or Tower Division), rather than the smaller modern London Borough of Tower Hamlets created in 1965.

== Origin ==
The enthusiasm for the Volunteer movement following an invasion scare in 1859 saw the creation of many Rifle, Artillery and Engineer Volunteer units composed of part-time soldiers eager to supplement the Regular British Army in time of need. One such unit was the 1st Tower Hamlets Engineer Volunteer Corps (EVC) formed at Cannon Street Road, Whitechapel, in the Tower Hamlets district of East London. The first officers' commissions were issued on 20 June 1861. Administratively, the unit was attached to the 1st Middlesex EVC in 1863. In 1865, it moved to a new HQ at Gretton Place, Victoria Park Square, in Bethnal Green. However, the London Gazette for 9 October 1868 announced the disbandment of the 1st Tower Hamlets EVC and simultaneously the formation of a new 2nd Tower Hamlets (East London) Engineer Volunteers. The officers' commissions for the new unit had been issued on 3 October, and by November the former members of the 1st Corps had been absorbed into the new unit, which also used the Gretton Place headquarters.

By 1872, the unit consisted of six companies. It was also administratively responsible for the 1st Hampshire (1870–81) and 1st Northamptonshire (1872–1901) EVCs and for the Cadet Corps at Bedford Grammar School (1888–1900). By 1876, it had moved its HQ the short distance to the barracks of the Queen's Own Royal Tower Hamlets Militia Light Infantry (later 5th Battalion, Rifle Brigade) in Victoria Park Square.

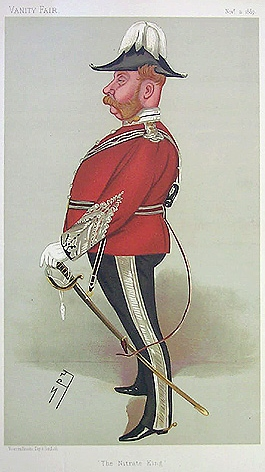
2 November 1889 Vanity Fair sketch of Tower Hamlets Colonel John Thomas North.

The EVC titles were abandoned in 1888, when the units became 'Engineer Volunteers, Royal Engineers', proclaiming their affiliation to the Regular Royal Engineers (RE), and then simply 'Royal Engineers (Volunteers)' in 1896. The Tower Hamlets unit was renamed the East London (Tower Hamlets) RE (V) in September 1900. From 1890 until his death in 1903, the commanding officer was Colonel William Whetherly, VD.

In 1896, the unit built a new drill hall at Victoria Park Square, next door to the Tower Hamlets Militia Barracks. It became a popular venue for boxing matches in the 1930s. The unit continued to occupy the drill hall into the 1960s. Today, the site is occupied by a police station built in 1997.

The unit sent a detachment of one officer and 25 other ranks to South Africa in 1900 to assist the regular REs during the Second Boer War; a second detachment went out the following year. Seven of the volunteers died on campaign (see Memorials below).

The eminent surgeon John Thomson-Walker (later knighted) was Surgeon-Lieutenant in the East London (Tower Hamlets) RE (V) from 1902.

== Territorial Force ==
When the Volunteers were subsumed into the Territorial Force in 1908 under the Haldane Reforms, the East London (Tower Hamlets) formed the 1st and 2nd London Field Companies RE in 1st London Division, while the 1st Middlesex RE (V) formed the 3rd and 4th London Field Companies for 2nd London Division. (The infantry of the two London divisions were entirely composed of battalions of the London Regiment.) In 1908, the plan had been for the London Electrical Engineers to provide the 1st London Divisional Telegraph Company, RE, but this arrangement was changed by 1910, and the Tower Hamlets RE provided this company as well. The commanding officer became the Commanding Royal Engineer (CRE) of 1st London Division. By the outbreak of World War I, the divisional engineers had the following organisation:

1st London Divisional Engineers

- CRE: Lt-Col G.W. Walters, TD
- 1st London Field Company, RE, Bethnal Green
- 2nd London Field Company, RE, Bethnal Green
- 1st London Signal Company, RE
  - HQ and No 1 Section, Bethnal Green
  - No 2 (1st London) Section, attached 1st London Brigade
  - No 3 (2nd London) Section, attached 2nd London Brigade
  - No 4 (3rd London) Section, attached 3rd London Brigade

== World War I ==
=== Mobilisation ===
The 1st London Division left by railway from Waterloo station on Sunday 2 August for its annual training camp, which was to be held at Wareham, Dorset. No sooner had it reached camp than it received orders to return to London for mobilisation. This process had been carefully planned so that, before war was declared on 4 August, the units were already at their war stations, such as guarding vital railway lines, while the rear details at the drill halls completed mobilisation and began recruiting.

On 15 August, the TF was ordered to separate men who had volunteered for overseas service from the Home Service men, and on 31 August it was authorised to begin forming Reserve or 2nd Line units composed of Home Service men and recruits. These were distinguished by the prefix '2/'. Later, the 2nd Line were made ready for overseas service and new Reserve or 3rd Line units were formed to continue to process of training. The 1st London Reserve Field Company was later numbered 516th Company before being absorbed into the central training organisation. An additional 1st Line company, the 1/5th, was also raised in September 1914, and joined the 2nd Line companies in 2/1st London Division on 16 November 1915.

On 4 September, the 1st London Bde, with its attached Signal Section, embarked for Malta, to relieve the Regular Army Garrison there. These were the first TF units to go on service overseas. During the autumn of 1914, 1st London Division was progressively broken up to provide reinforcements for formations serving overseas.

=== 1/1st London Field Company ===
1/1st London Field Company joined the Regular 6th Division in France on 23 December 1914 and remained with that formation throughout the war. When RE field companies were renumbered on 1 February 1917, it became 509th (London) Field Company.

=== 1/2nd London Field Company ===
In January 1915, 1/2nd London Field Company, followed in February by the Signal section from Malta, joined the 29th Division, formed from Regular troops returned from the Empire. They remained with it throughout the war, serving at Gallipoli and on the Western Front. The field company became 510th (London) Field Company in February 1917.

When the Germans counter-attacked at Cambrai on 30 November 1917 and threatened to break through, capturing one of 29th Division's field companies, the divisional Commander, RE, Lt-Col H. Biddulph, organised the others to support the infantry. He gathered 510th Fd Co and the divisional pioneers (1/2nd Battalion, Monmouthshire Regiment) to form an improvised defence line, brought up ammunition for them, and finally handed them over to an infantry brigadier. 29th Division was finally relieved on the night of 3 December.

=== 56th Divisional Engineers ===
2/1st and 2/2nd London Field Companies and 2/1st London Signal Company served at home with 58th (2/1st London) Division until February 1916, when they left to join 1st London Division (now numbered 56th (1/1st London) Division), which was reforming in France. The signal company was numbered 56th (1st London) Divisional Signals and, from February 1917, the field companies were numbered 512th and 513th (London) Field Companies. Once in France, they were joined by 1/1st Edinburgh Field Company (later 416th (Edinburgh) Field Company), just returned from Egypt, which was attached to 169th (1/3rd London) Brigade.

==== Gommecourt ====
56th Division's first major operation was the attack on the Gommecourt Salient on 1 July 1916. This was a diversionary attack to support the start of the main offensive on the Somme. The obvious problem was the width of No man's land in front of the division: the troops would have to cross 700 yards to reach the enemy front line. The divisional commander decided to dig a new jumping-off trench 400 yards closer to the enemy. This was done at night under conditions of extreme secrecy, with half of 2/2nd London Field Co engaged in marking out the new line on 25/26 May, and it was dug under their supervision by 167th (1st London) Bde and the pioneer battalion (1/5th Battalion Cheshire Regiment) the following night.

The night before the attack, battalion scouts from 1/14th Londons (the London Scottish), the right-hand battalion, found that the wire in their front had not been adequately cut by the British bombardment. With the help of two men from 2/1st Field Co, the London Scottish successfully exploded two Bangalore torpedoes to clear lanes through the wire.

For the attack on 1 July, 56th Divisional Engineers had No 2 Company of 5th Battalion, Special Brigade, RE, attached to provide a smokescreen using 4 inch Stokes Mortars and smoke candles. E Section with 12 mortars was attached to 169th (3rd London) Bde, G Section with 8 mortars supported 168th (2nd London) Bde. The company began firing smoke bombs into the German line and lit its candles at 07.20, which provided a smokescreen across the division's attacking front before the artillery barrage lifted and the infantry went 'over the top' at 07.30. The smoke cloud slowly thinned, but it lingered for 45 minutes in the hollow in front of Gommecourt village and Nameless Farm, and on the far right No 20 Sub-section continued firing smoke bombs for 65 minutes. But the mortar positions at the heads of the British communication trenches were prime targets for the German artillery, and several mortar crews became casualties. No 15 Sub-section was supposed to have taken two mortars over to help 169th Bde, but all but two of the 22-man carrying party were hit in the communication trenches and the sub-section was never able to cross No-man's land.

168th Brigade was ordered to capture the first three line of German trenches and establish strongpoints on the flanks and at Nameless Farm; 169th Bde was to capture three lines of trenches, establish strongpoints, and then move on to capture the Quadrilateral strongpoint and meet up with 46th (North Midland) Division on the far side of Gommecourt village. Each attacking brigade had a section of an RE field company and a company of pioneers attached to it.

The leading battalions of the two attacking brigades succeeded in the first phase of the assault, crossing No man's land behind the smokescreen and seizing the German front line trench comparatively easily. No 1 Section of 2/2nd Field Co accompanied the London Scottish in 168th Bde's attack on the right. Their task was to build trench blocks to the flank and in the communication trenches in front, to hinder German counter-attacks. The first job was to block the front line trench, named 'Fair Trench', while a London Scottish bombing party worked its way along the trench ahead of the sappers. The party blew in four traverses and erected two wire barricades. Other sappers followed the leading London Scottish waves and blocked the second line trench, 'Fancy Trench'.

Behind the London Scottish, two sappers of 1/1st Edinburgh Field Co were due to mark out a new communication trench across No man's land, to be dug by the 1/13th Londons (the Kensingtons). But, by now, the smokescreen was clearing and the German counter-barrage of artillery and machine-gun fire made this impossible. To the rear of 1/5th Londons (the London Rifle Brigade), on 169th Bde's front, pairs of sappers from 1/1st Edinburgh Field Co were similarly marking out two more trenches for 1/3rd Londons to dig. These were successfully marked, and Lance-Corporal Ellis then reconnoitred a German front-line dug-out and reported on it for the staff. However, 1/3rd Londons and their supervising sappers suffered heavy casualties and were unable to begin the digging, while other Edinburgh sappers were prevented from leading carrying parties across to establish dumps of engineering stores in the captured German front line. More Edinburgh sappers were killed while they and the Cheshire Pioneers cleared the Hebuterne–Gommecourt road through the British lines behind the attack by the 1/12th Londons (The Rangers). Nevertheless, using charges of gun cotton they succeeded in clearing each barricade, opening the road for reserves and supplies.

However, little made it across to the two brigades in the German lines. After an initial success, 169th Bde had been held up by the inability of The Rangers of 168th Bde to take Nameless Farm, and both brigades were cut off in the German lines unable to get supplies and reinforcements across the fire-swept No man's land. In the afternoon, realising that the Londoners' break-in was an isolated success, and had been contained, the Germans began counter-attacking. By 16.00, the 56th Division had been pushed back to the German front line, where they were running short of men and ammunition. By 21.00, resistance had ended in the German lines, and everybody who could get back had returned to the British lines.

The three field companies of 56th Divisional Engineers had suffered one officer and 23 other ranks killed or died of wounds, many of those who were killed outright in No Man's land or in the German lines having no known grave and being commemorated on the Thiepval Memorial to the missing of the Somme.

==== Further service ====
56th Divisional Engineers served through the following further actions during World War I:

- Battle of the Somme
  - Battle of Ginchy, 9 September
  - Battle of Flers-Courcelette, 15–22 September
  - Battle of Morval, 25–27 September
  - Capture of Combles, 26 September
  - Battle of the Transloy Ridges, 1–9 October

1917

- German Retreat to the Hindenburg Line, 14 March–5 April
- Battles of Arras
  - First Battle of the Scarpe, 9–14 April
  - Third Battle of the Scarpe, 3–4 May
- Third Battle of Ypres
  - Battle of Langemarck, 16–17 August
- Battle of Cambrai – for which the divisional engineers constructed dummy tanks and figures to divert enemy fire.
  - Capture of Tadpole Copse, 21 November – when 416th (Edinburgh) Fd Co bridged the Canal du Nord and 512th (London) Fd Co repaired the approach road.
  - Capture of Bourlon Wood, 23–28 November – during the defence of Tadpole Copse against German counter-attacks, the Signal Company erected their wireless masts despite the barrage and maintained contact between the front line and brigade HQ.
  - German Counter-attacks, 30 November–2 December

1918

- First Battles of the Somme
  - First Battle of Arras, 28 March – when the RE formed part of the divisional reserve during the German attack, and had to block communication trenches running back from the front line where the division had been forced to retire
- Second Battle of the Somme
  - Battle of Albert, 23 August
- Second Battles of Arras
  - Battle of the Scarpe, 26–30 August
- Battles of the Hindenburg Line
  - Battle of the Canal du Nord, 27 September–1 October – where 512nd and 513th (London) Fd Cos had to clear hostile infantry from the canal bank before they could build their bridges
  - Second Battle of Cambrai, 8–9 October

==== Sensée Canal ====
Corporal James McPhie, VC.

After the pursuit to the Selle (9–12 October), 56th Division sent two companies of the 1/2nd Londons over the Sensée Canal during the night of 12/13 October using rafts and then a floating bridge constructed by 416th (Edinburgh) Fd Co in the dark while within yards of enemy posts. The 1/2nd Londons captured Aubigny-au-Bac, but the Germans counter-attacked the following morning, and the companies were withdrawn at dusk. That night a fresh patrol went across the footbridge, despite the Germans being within hand grenade range. The bridge broke, and Cpl James McPhie and Spr Cox, of 416th Fd Co, jumped into the water to hold it together. McPhie and his men then set about repairing the bridge after daybreak, while under fire. McPhie and Cox were both mortally wounded, but the bridge held and the bridgehead was maintained until after 56th Division had been relieved by 4th Canadian Division on 14 October. Corporal McPhie was awarded a posthumous Victoria Cross.

During the final Advance in Picardy, the divisional RE were mainly engaged in road repair to enable the division to continue moving forwards. The 56th Division fought two last battles:

- Battle of the Sambre, 4 November
- Passage of the Grande Honnelle, 5–7 November

After the Armistice with Germany, 56th Division was employed on road-mending. Its units began to demobilise on 12 December, and the process was complete by 10 June 1919.

=== 58th Divisional Engineers ===
When the 2/1st and 2/2nd London Field Companies were transferred from the 58th to the 56th London Division, the 58th Divisional Engineers was left with only the 1/5th London Field Company (numbered 511th in February 1917); the gaps were filled in February 1916 by the 2/1st and 2/2nd Wessex (later 503rd and 504th) Field Companies and 2/1st Wessex (later 58th) Signal Company from the 45th (2nd Wessex) Division, whose infantry had been sent to garrison India.

From August 1915, 58th Division was billeted around Ipswich, digging trenches, manning coastal defences, and training, until July 1916, when it moved to Salisbury Plain for final battle training. The division began embarking for France on 20 January 1917 and by early February it was on the Western Front, where it remained for the rest of the war.

58th Divisional Engineers served through the following actions during World War I:

1917

- German Retreat to the Hindenburg Line, 17–28 March
- Battle of Bullecourt, 4–17 May
- Actions on the Hindenburg Line, 20 May–16 June
- Third Battle of Ypres
  - Battle of the Menin Road Ridge, 20–25 September
  - Battle of Polygon Wood, 26–27 September
  - Second Battle of Passchendaele, 26 October–10 November

1918

- First Battles of the Somme
  - Battle of St Quentin, 21 March–3 April

When the Germans broke through on 21 March, the REs began destroying bridges across the River Oise to deny them to the enemy. III Corps RE passed responsibility for four light railway bridges at Chauny to 504th Fd Co, which destroyed them, but not without trouble. The damage to one of them would not prevent the German infantry from crossing it. The river became the main line of defence for III Corps until French help arrived. On 31 March, when the enemy had been in Chauny for 10 days, Maj William Tamlyn of 504th Fd Co personally reconnoitred the damaged bridge, and by placing combustible materials underneath and setting light to it he succeeded in completing its destruction.

  - Second Battle of Villers-Bretonneux, 24–25 April
- Battle of Amiens 8–11 August
- Second Battle of the Somme
  - Battle of Albert, 22–23 August
  - Second Battle of Bapaume, 31 August–1 September
- Battles of the Hindenburg Line
  - Battle of Épehy, 18 September
- Final Advance in Artois and Flanders, 2 October–11 November.

After the Armistice came into force, skilled men began to return home. Full demobilisation got under way in March 1919 and the last units left for England in June.

== Interwar ==
56th Division began to reform in April 1920 as part of the reorganised Territorial Army (TA). The signals company became 56th (1st London) Divisional Signals in the newly formed Royal Corps of Signals). Initially the Divisional Engineers consisted of 216th, 217th and 218th (1st London) Field Companies; later 219th (London) Field Park Company was added.

In 1935, the two London divisions were reorganised: the headquarters of 47th (2nd London) became HQ 1st Anti-Aircraft Division, and a number of London battalions were converted to air defence roles. The rest were amalgamated into a single London Division. The divisional engineers were provided from the 47th (descended from the 1st Middlesex EVC) leaving those of 56th Division surplus: they became a corps engineer unit under the title of 56th Corps Troops RE (CTRE). With the expansion of the TA after the Munich Crisis, the unit became 1st London CTRE and formed a duplicate 2nd London CTRE (less some elements that went back to the reformed 56th Division).

== World War II ==
The two units mobilised in September 1939 with the following organisation:

1st London Corps Troops Engineers (Bethnal Green)

- 216th (1st London) Army Field Company
- 217th (1st London) Army Field Company
- 218th (1st London) Army Field Company
- 219th (London) Army Field Park Company

2nd London Corps Troops Engineers (Barnet)

- 294th Army Field Company
- 295th Army Field Company
- 296th Army Field Company
- 297th Army Field Park Company

=== 1st London CTRE ===
1st London CTRE's companies were dispersed after mobilisation and assigned to other HQs. 216th, 217th and 218th (1st London) Companies joined the British Expeditionary Force (BEF) in France, 216th with General Headquarters (GHQ), 217th with III Corps and 218th with Lines of Communications (LoC). After the Dunkirk evacuation, 216th and 217th Companies went to the Middle East with III CTRE, which was disbanded in April 1942. 218th Company served with British Troops Northern Ireland in 1940–41, then in Gibraltar 1942–44. On 21 April 1945, the company arrived in India and moved to the Ranchi area where it served as part of 101 LoC Area. It was back in Gibraltar in 1946.

==== Tobruk ====
219th (London) Field Park Company did not go to France, but remained in the London area, assigned to IV Corps after Dunkirk. Later, it was sent to Egypt where it joined 6th Division on 29 July 1941. The division was progressively shipped into the besieged Libyan port of Tobruk during September and October 1941 to relieve the mainly Australian garrison, and it was redesignated 70th Division on 10 October to deceive Axis intelligence. The division's role was to prepare for a breakout to meet the planned offensive by the British Eighth Army, but the engineers were also involved in strengthening the defences, building an underground hangar for the Desert Air Force, and clearing enemy minefields (making a study of the new Teller mine).

==== Chindits ====
Once Tobruk was relieved, 70th Division moved back to Egypt, and after a short spell in Syria, it went by sea to India, arriving in March 1942. In September 1943, the division was broken up and its units handed over to 'Special Force' (the 'Chindits'). 219th Company was redesignated 219th Special Field Park Company on 1 January 1944. The company as a whole appears to have remained with Special Force HQ, but detachments may have flown into Burma with the Long Range Penetration columns during the Second Chindit Operation.

The company dropped "Special" from its title on 15 March 1945 and arrived in the Ranchi area under the command of Army Troops. It was assigned 36th Indian Division at Poona on 22 June 1945, and was disbanded in 1946.

=== 2nd London CTRE ===
The 2nd Line companies of 2nd London CTRE remained in London District until May 1940, when they too were dispersed.

==== Iceland ====
294th Field Company was sent to Iceland with Alabaster Force in June 1940, where it was engaged in building a new airfield near Reykjavík, which involved floating a concrete runway over a peat bog using a base of cut-down concrete drums covered with rolled local lava. Most of Alabaster Force was provided by 49th (West Riding) Division, and 294th Field Company remained with this division when the force was relieved and returned to the UK in April 1942.

==== North Africa ====
295th Field Company was also assigned to IV Corps after Dunkirk, and went to North Africa late in 1940. During the retreat to the Egyptian frontier, after the German intervention in March 1941 (Operation Sonnenblume), 295th Field Company was engaged in destroying port installations and jetties at Bardia and Sollum, putting water supplies out of action and in cratering roads to hinder the Axis advance.

In September 1942, it joined 23rd Independent Armoured Brigade for the Second Battle of El Alamein,

The company then joined 231st Independent Brigade Group in Sicily in time for the assault landing at Porto San Venere on the Italian mainland on 7 September 1943 (Operation Ferdy). After this, 231 Brigade became an integral part of the 50th Northumbrian Division and was recalled home with the division, to prepare for Operation Overlord

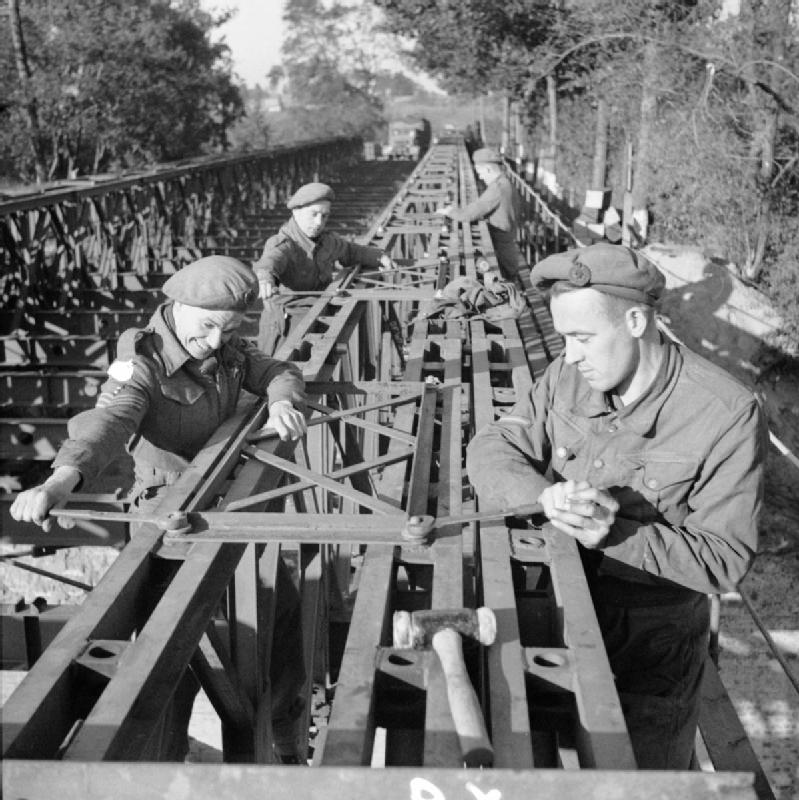
Sappers of 294th Field Company building a Bailey bridge across the Antwerp–Turnhout Canal, 9 October 1944.

==== North West Europe ====
294th Field Company landed in Normandy on 12 June 1944 and fought through the campaign in North West Europe until VE Day as part of 49th (West Riding) Divisional Engineers.

295th Field Company landed on D-day (6 June) as part of 50th (Northumbrian) Division's assault on Gold Beach and fought through the rest of the campaign. When 50th Division was broken up for reinforcements at the end of 1944, the divisional engineers continued as 50th GHQ Troops RE (GHQTRE), and were heavily involved in the assault crossing of the Rhine (Operation Plunder).

297th Corps Field Park Company had been assigned to 15th (Kent) GHQTRE and on D-day was assisting 102 Beach Sub-area (the RE organisation supporting 3rd Canadian Division's assault on Juno Beach). Thereafter, it served through the campaign with 15th (Kent) GHQTRE, including the assault crossing of the River Seine at Vernon by 43rd (Wessex) Infantry Division, and Operation Plunder.

=== 18th (1st London) GHQTRE ===
Meanwhile, the HQs of 1st and 2nd London Corps Engineers had re-amalgamated in 1943 and become 18th (1st London) GHQTRE. In the North West Europe campaign, it had the following units under command at various times:

- 74th Field Company
- 84th Field Company
- 91st Field Company
- 173rd Field Company
- 213th (North Midland) Field Company
- 940th Inland Water Transport Company)

Of these, 74th, 84th and 91st were former Chemical Warfare Companies converted into Field Companies in 1943, while 173rd (a former Railway Tunnelling Company) and 213th had been brought back from the Italian Front.

==== D-day ====
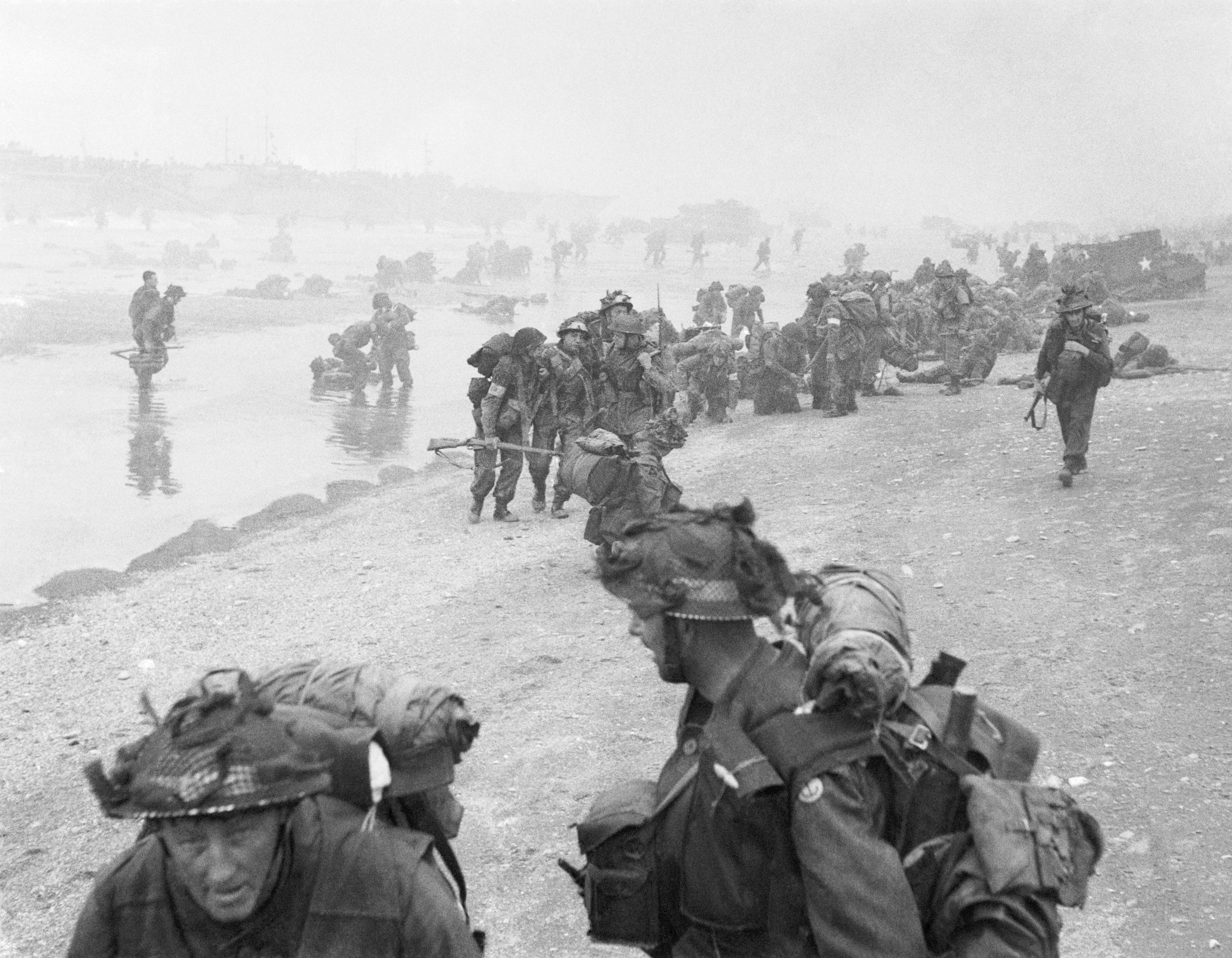
Troops of 3rd Division on Queen Red beach, Sword area, circa 08.45 on 6 June 1944. In the foreground are sappers of 84 Field Company RE, part of No.5 Beach Group, identified by the white bands around their helmets.

On D-Day, 18th GHQTRE provided the RE HQ for 101 Beach Sub-area (5 and 6 Beach Groups) supporting 3rd Division's assault on Sword Beach:

- 84th Field Company
- 91st Field Company
- 8th & 9th Stores Sections
- 50th Mechanical Equipment Section
- 205th Works Section
- 654th Artisan Works Company
- 722nd Artisan Works Company
- Two Advanced Park Sections of 176th Workshops and Park Company
- 49th Bomb Disposal Section
- 999th Port Operating Company
- 1028th Port Operating Company

After the success of the landings, 18th GHQTRE reverted to commanding its own units, except 940th Inland Water Transport Company, which was transferred to 9th Port Operating Group after D-Day.

==== Operation Goodwood ====
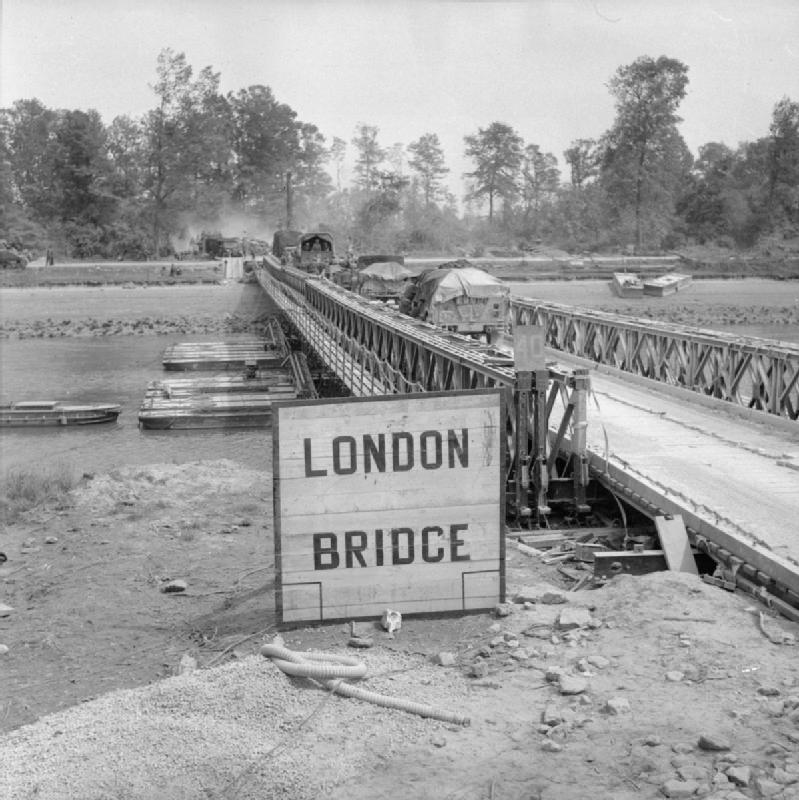
Vehicles move over 'London Bridge' on the Orne during Operation Goodwood, 18 July 1944

The next major engineering operation was to strengthen existing bridges (such as Pegasus Bridge) and build new ones over the River Orne and Caen Canal in preparation for Operation Goodwood. 18th GHQTRE was one of the RE assigned to I Corps for this work, which had to be carried out in secrecy on the night of 17/18 July, but required much preparation in road building and mine clearing, as well as bringing up and concealing the bridging material.

==== Rhine crossing ====
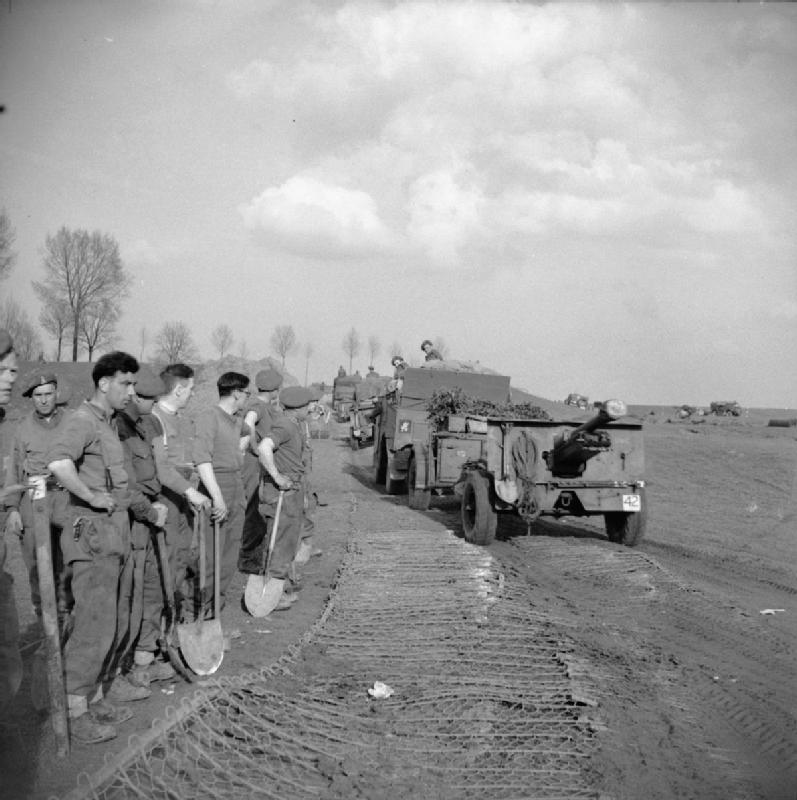
Sappers complete the approach road to 'Waterloo Bridge', 27 March 1945

Later in the campaign, 18th GHQTRE was involved in bridging operations after the assault crossing of the Rhine (Operation Plunder). It was given the task of building a Class 9 Folding Boat Equipment (FBE) bridge for XXX Corps codenamed 'Waterloo' immediately after the assault on the night of 23/24 March. The original site was near Rees, but this had not been cleared by the morning and on 24 March all that could be done was some work on the approaches and to send an officer's patrol across to reconnoitre the proposed exits. Next morning, it was decided to move the bridge to a site downstream near Honnopel. Work started at 09.30 on 25 March, shielded by a smokescreen, and the bridge opened for traffic at midnight. Shortly before this, a low-flying German aircraft attacked 213th Field Company working on the far side of the bridge, but was driven off.

Once the bridges were in place, the RE had to provide protection for them. In conjunction with the Royal Navy, they constructed booms across the river to prevent the enemy floating boats or mines downstream to damage the bridges. In XXX Corps' sector, 18th GHQTRE was instructed to build two 'Arrow' booms devised by the engineers of US Seventh Army. However, the RE had problems with this design, and instead stretched one of steel wire rope and Jerricans across the river well upstream of Rees.

== Postwar ==
When the TA was reconstituted in 1947, the unit was reformed as 114 (1st London) Army Engineer Regiment at Bethnal Green with 216–8 Field Squadrons and 219 Field Park Squadron. The regiment was assigned to 27 Engineer Group. In 1956, it was redesignated as a Field Engineer Regiment; and in 1961, it was redesignated as a Corps Engineer Regiment, when 216 and 219 Sqns were disbanded.

In addition, the London Corps TREs, together with the former 47th (London) Divisional RE, formed 121 Construction Regiment, RE, based at the Chelsea HQ of the latter unit. Between 1950 and 1961, 121 Rgt's companies were progressively absorbed into the new unit at Chelsea, 101 Field Engineer Regiment.

When the TA was converted into the TAVR in 1967, the regiment was reduced to B Company (1st London Engineers) in the short-lived London Yeomanry and Territorials. In 1969, it moved into 73 Regiment, RE, regaining an historic number as 217 (London) Field Squadron. While most of the regiment was based in the Midlands, 217 Sqn remained in London, now at 65 Parkhurst Road, Holloway. Its role was as a reinforcement combat engineer unit to support I Corps in British Army of the Rhine.

Later, while the rest of 73 Regiment converted to the air support role, 217 Sqn converted to explosives ordnance disposal (EOD) in 1975. In 1988, it joined 101 (City of London) Engineer Regiment (an EOD regiment descended from the 1st Middlesex Engineers). More recently, it has been part of 33 Engineer Regiment (EOD). The latter is a hybrid unit, containing both Regular and Reserve subunits. 217 Squadron is based at Ilford in London and Southend-on-Sea in Essex. Under the Army 2020 reorganisation, the squadron is due to open a new centre in Wimbish, also in Essex.

== Honorary Colonel ==
The following officers served as Honorary Colonel of the unit:

- Alexander Angus Croll (1811–87), a chemical engineer and director of several gas works and telegraph companies, was appointed hon colonel of the 2nd Tower Hamlets (East London) EVC on 28 September 1869.
- Colonel R.H. Joseph was appointed hon col of the 56th (1st London) Divisional Engineers on 16 February 1929, having been commanding officer since 10 July 1918.
- W.C. Devereux was appointed hon col of 56th (1st London) CTRE on 16 February 1938.

== Memorials ==
There are several memorial plaques to members of the unit in the church of St John on Bethnal Green, close to the former drill hall in Victoria Square.

- The oldest is a brass plate listing the six NCOs and one sapper of the East London Royal Engineers (Vol) who died during the South African War 1900–02. A small brass plate underneath explains that the plaque was presented by Colonel William Whetherly, CO of the unit from 1890 to the date of his own death on 9 January 1903, and was unveiled on 16 January 1904 by Maj-Gen W.T. Shone, Inspector-General of Fortifications.
- The second memorial is a brass plate dedicated to the 675 officers, NCOs and men of the 1st London Divisional Engineers who died in World War I.
- The third is a white metal plate honouring the officers, WOs, NCOs and men of 114 (1st London) Army Engineer Regiment who died in World War II. (The regimental title is anachronistic: it was not used until 1947 when the regiment was reformed.)
