= Walter Campbell (British Army officer) =

British Army general

Lieutenant-General Sir Walter Campbell KCB KCMG DSO
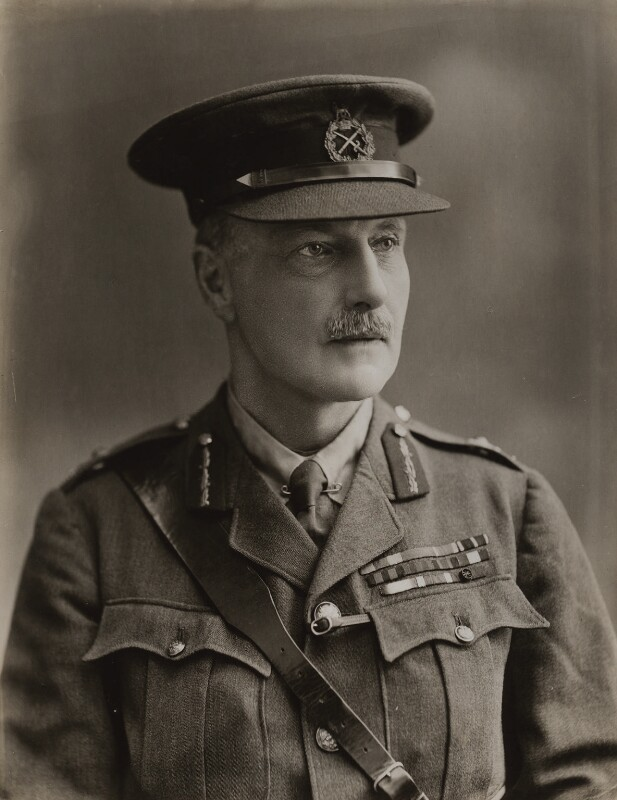
- Campbell in 1918
- Born: 30 July 1864; County Antrim, Ireland
- Died: 11 August 1936 (aged 72); Merstham, Surrey, England
- Military career
- Allegiance: United Kingdom
- Branch: British Army
- Service years: 1887–1927
- Rank: Lieutenant-General
- Conflicts: Chitral Expedition; Tirah campaign Second Boer War; First World War
- Awards: Knight Commander of the Order of the Bath; Knight Commander of the Order of St Michael and St George; Distinguished Service Order; Mentioned in Despatches; Order of the White Eagle, 2nd Class (Serbia)

Lieutenant-General Sir Walter Campbell, KCB, KCMG, DSO (30 July 1864 – 11 August 1936) was a British Army officer who served as Quartermaster-General to the Forces from 1923 to 1927.

== Early life and education ==
Campbell was born in County Antrim, Ireland, the son of John Campbell of Rathfern, White Abbey, Belfast. He was educated at Wellington College and Trinity College, Cambridge, but left university after three years for Sandhurst when he decided upon a military career.

== Military career ==
Campbell was commissioned a second lieutenant in the Gordon Highlanders on 5 February 1887, promoted to lieutenant on 5 December 1890, and saw early service with the Waziristan Field Force and the Chitral Relief Force (1895). He was promoted to captain on 11 January 1897, served in the Tirah Expeditionary Force (1897–98), and received a brevet promotion to major on 20 May 1898.

From 1899 to 1900 he served in the Second Boer War, for which he was awarded the Distinguished Service Order in November 1900. He then became brigade major for the Highland Brigade serving in South Africa, (presumably) in March 1900. The war ended with the Peace of Vereeniging in late May 1902, and the following month Campbell returned home in the SS Tagus, arriving at Southampton in July.

Following his return, he was on 19 October 1902 appointed Deputy Assistant Adjutant-General (DAAG) to the 3rd Army Corps, stationed in Ireland. He was promoted to major in April 1906 and to lieutenant colonel in January 1907, while serving as a deputy assistant director at headquarters. In October 1908 he was appointed as a GSO2 at the War Office.

After having served as a GSO2, Campbell was placed on half-pay in April 1911 and promoted to colonel in July. He was made an assistant quartermaster general in December 1911.

Campbell served in the First World War, receiving a promotion to brigadier general and being assigned as a deputy adjutant and quartermaster general (DAAG), while serving with the British Expeditionary Force (BEF), in October 1914, in succession to Robert Wanless O'Gowan. He was later promoted to temporary major general in July 1915, becoming Deputy Quartermaster-General to the Mediterranean Expeditionary Force being promoted to substantive major general on 1 January 1916 and taking part in the evacuation of Allied forces at Gallipoli. By June 1918 he was Quartermaster-General with the Imperial Camel Corps in Jordan. According to The Times, Campbell's "genius for administration made him an outstanding figure of the War." He was awarded the Order of the White Eagle, 2nd Class by the Government of Serbia in February 1917, and appointed a Knight Commander of the Order of the Bath in the 1919 New Year Honours.

In 1918, Campbell was sketched by artist James McBey, the official war artist to the Palestine Expeditionary Force. Having been appointed major general in command of administration in July 1919, in succession to Major General Reginald Salmond Curtis, he was promoted to lieutenant general in August 1921.l and appointed Quartermaster-General to the Forces in 1923; he retired four years later on 16 March 1927.

He died at the age of 72 on 11 August 1936.

Military offices
Preceded by Sir Travers Clarke	Quartermaster-General to the Forces; 1923–1927	Succeeded by Sir Hastings Anderson
