= 1st London Field Company Royal Engineers =

1st London Field Company, RE 509th (London) Field Company, RE
- A Great War era cap badge of the Royal Engineers with the crown & cypher of George V
- Active: 1908–1919
- Country: United Kingdom
- Branch: Territorial Force
- Type: Field engineers
- Size: Company
- Part of: 1st London Division; 6th Division
- Garrison/HQ: Bethnal Green
- Engagements: World War I: Hooge; Somme; Hill 70, Lens; Cambrai; German spring offensive; Hundred Days Offensive

The 1st London Field Company, Royal Engineers (Territorial Force) was a Territorial engineer unit of the British Army active during World War I. Formed in 1908, it was based in Bethnal Green in East London.

== Origin ==
When the former Volunteer Force was subsumed into the Territorial Force in 1908 under the Haldane Reforms, the East London (Tower Hamlets) Royal Engineers (Volunteers) became the divisional engineers for the TF's 1st London Division, forming the 1st London Field Company and 2nd London Field Company as well as the Divisional Signals Company. All three sub-units were based at the drill hall at Victoria Park Square, Bethnal Green, which the East London Engineers had built in 1896.

== World War I ==
=== Mobilisation ===
The 1st London Division left by railway from Waterloo station on Sunday, 2 August 1914 for its annual training camp, which was to be held at Wareham, Dorset. No sooner had it reached camp than it received orders to return to London for mobilisation. This process had been carefully planned, so that before war was declared on 4 August the units were already at their war stations, such as guarding vital railway lines, while the rear details at the drill halls completed mobilisation and began recruiting.

On 15 August, the TF was ordered to separate men who had volunteered for overseas service from the Home Service men, and on 31 August it was authorised to begin forming Reserve or 2nd Line units composed of Home Service men and recruits. These were distinguished by the prefix '2/', so that the 1st London Field Company became the 1/1st, and its second line was the 2/1st London Field Company in 2/1st London Division. Later, the 2nd Line were made ready for overseas service and new Reserve or 3rd Line units were formed to continue to process of training. The 1st London Reserve Field Company was later numbered 516th Company before being absorbed into the central training organisation.

During the autumn of 1914, 1st London Division was progressively broken up to provide reinforcements for formations serving overseas. 1/1st London Field Company joined the Regular 6th Division in France on 23 December 1914 and remained with that formation throughout the war. When RE field companies were renumbered on 1 February 1917, it became 509th (London) Field Company.

=== 6th Division ===
6th Division served on the Western Front throughout World War I, taking part in the following operations:

- Battle of Hooge (9 August 1915)

On 9 August 1915 the 6th Division attacked and recaptured the chateau at Hooge. Number 4 Section of the company joined in the attack alongside the 2nd Battalion Durham Light Infantry, and the company suffered its highest casualties in a single day. The work of the company in fortifying the newly captured position with barbed wire received special mention in the report by GHQ. Sapper Berry received the Distinguished Conduct Medal for his actions in the attack.

- Battle of the Somme:
  - Battle of Flers-Courcelette (15–18 and 21–23 September 1916)
  - Battle of Morval (25–28 September 1916)
  - Capture of Lesbœufs (25 September 1916)
  - Battle of the Transloy Ridges (9–18 October 1916)
- Fighting on Hill 70, Lens (13–22 April 1917).
- Battle of Cambrai
  - The Tank attack (20–21 November 1917)
  - Capture of Bourlon Wood (23–28 November 1917)
  - German counter-attacks (30 November–3 December 1917)

During the Battle of Cambrai 6th Divisional Engineers were employed consolidating captured positions, supervising untrained infantry in the work in the absence of the divisional pioneer battalion. After the German counter-attack began on 30 November they were employed as infantry for three days in an attempt to hold the enemy back. During the final withdrawal on 3 December 509th Fd Co blew up a large ammunition dump to prevent it falling into the hands of the enemy.

- German spring offensive
  - Battle of St Quentin (21–22 March 1918)

By February 1918, the 6th Division was manning the Lagnicourt Sector and was there on 21 March when the Germans launched their Spring Offensive, which drove the division back and caused 3,900 casualties out of its 5,000 infantry. The divisional history records that 'The field companies suffered heavily, and rendered good service as infantry'. The Official History records that 509th Fd Co served as the reserve of 16th Brigade facing the heaviest weight of the attack up the Hirondelle valley.

  - Battle of Bailleul (13–15 April 1918)
  - First Battle of Kemmel Ridge (17–19 April 1918)
  - Second Battle of Kemmel Ridge (25–26 April 1918)
  - Battle of the Scherpenberg (29 April 1918)
- Allied Hundred Days Offensive
  - Battle of Épehy (18 September 1918)
  - Battle of St. Quentin Canal (29–30 September 1918)
  - Battle of Cambrai (8–9 October 1918)
  - Battle of the Selle

In November 1918, its commanding officer was Major H. G. Bambridge, MC, RE(S).

The Territorials were demobilised in 1919.

=== Last survivor ===
In August 2002, William Burnett, probably the last surviving member of the company, was awarded the French Legion of Honour.

=== 2/1st London Field Company ===
See main article 58th Divisional Engineers

2/1st London Field Company served at home with the 2/1st London Division (now numbered the 58th (2/1st London) Division) until February 1916, when the 58th Divisional Engineers left to join 1st London Division (by now numbered 56th (1/1st London) Division), which was reforming in France. It served with that formation for the remainder of the war. From February 1917, it was numbered 512th (London) Field Company.

== Later history ==
See main article Tower Hamlets Engineers

56th (London) Division reformed in 1920 as part of the reorganised Territorial Army (TA). The field companies of the Divisional Engineers were all labelled (1st London), the senior being numbered 216th.

In 1935, the two London divisions were merged into a single formation, and 56th Divisional Engineers became surplus. It was converted into a Corps Troops RE unit (originally 56th CTRE, later 1st London CTRE) at Bethnal Green. On the outbreak of war in 1939, 1st London CTRE's companies were dispersed and assigned to other HQs. 216th (1st London) Field Company joined General Headquarters (GHQ) with the British Expeditionary Force (BEF) in France. After the Dunkirk evacuation, it went to the Middle East with III CTRE, which was disbanded in April 1942.

When the TA was reconstituted in 1947, the former 56th Divisional Engineers was reformed at Bethnal Green as 114 (1st London) Army Engineer Regiment with 216–8 Field Squadrons and 219 Field Park Squadron. In 1956, it was redesignated as a Field Engineer Regiment, and again in 1961 as a Corps Engineer Regiment, when 216 Sqn was disbanded.

== Memorials ==
There are several memorial plaques to members of the East London Engineers in the church of St John on Bethnal Green, close to the former drill hall in Victoria Square. One is a brass plate dedicated to the 675 officers, NCOs and men of the 1st London Divisional Engineers who died in World War I.
