= John Longley =

British Army general

Major-General Sir John Longley KCMG CB
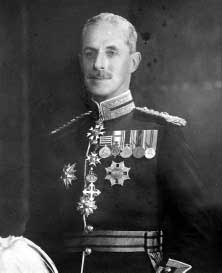
- Born: 7 March 1867; Cheltenham, Gloucestershire, England
- Died: 13 February 1953 (aged 85)
- Military career
- Allegiance: United Kingdom
- Branch: British Army
- Service years: 1887–1920; 1939–1945
- Rank: Major-General
- Unit: East Surrey Regiment
- Commands: 1st Battalion, East Surrey Regiment; 82nd Infantry Brigade; 10th (Irish) Division; 44th (Home Counties) Division
- Conflicts: Second Boer War; World War I World War II
- Awards: Knight Commander of the Order of St Michael and St George; Companion of the Order of the Bath; Mentioned in despatches (10)

Major-General Sir John Raynsford Longley KCMG CB (7 March 1867 – 13 February 1953) was a British Army officer who reached high command during World War I, ultimately ending the war as commander of the 10th (Irish) Division.

== Early life and military career ==
Educated at Cheltenham College, Longley was commissioned into the 4th (Militia) Battalion, East Surrey Regiment in April 1885 before transferring over to the Regular Army two years later.

He served as an adjutant in January 1890 and, promoted in March 1895 to captain, he was seconded for service in South Africa in 1902, towards the end of the Second Boer War. He was promoted to major in July 1904.

In June 1911 Longley was promoted to lieutenant colonel and appointed commanding officer (CO) of the 1st Battalion, East Surreys.

== First World War ==
He went to France at the head of his battalion, which by now formed part of the 14th Infantry Brigade of the 5th Division, in August 1914, shortly after the start of First World War, fighting in the battles of Mons and the subsequent retreat from Mons, Le Cateau, the Marne, the Aisne, La Bassée and Armentières. He was described during these trying few months as being "a fine commanding officer, courageous to a fault", one who "set an example of leadership" and "was a constant source of inspiration" to the men who made up his command.

In January 1915, after being promoted to the temporary rank of brigadier general, he was appointed general officer commanding (GOC) of the 27th Division's 82nd Infantry Brigade in succession to Brigadier General Lionel Stopford. In February he was promoted to brevet colonel and in June his substantive rank was advanced from brevet colonel to colonel but with seniority dating back to December 1914. The brigade, together with the rest of the 27th Division, was sent to the Macedonian front towards the end of the year.

In December, after being promoted to the temporary rank of major general, he became the GOC of the 10th (Irish) Division, which, like the 27th Division, was also serving in Macedonia as part of the British Salonika Army. He was made a CB on 3 June 1916. He retained command of this division until 1919, serving in Macedonia, before moving to join the Egyptian Expeditionary Force (EEF) in September 1917 where the division was part of XX Corps in its advance into Palestine.

His rank of major general, only temporary until now, became substantive in January 1918, and he was awarded the Companion of the Order of St Michael and St George in June.

== Post-war and final years ==
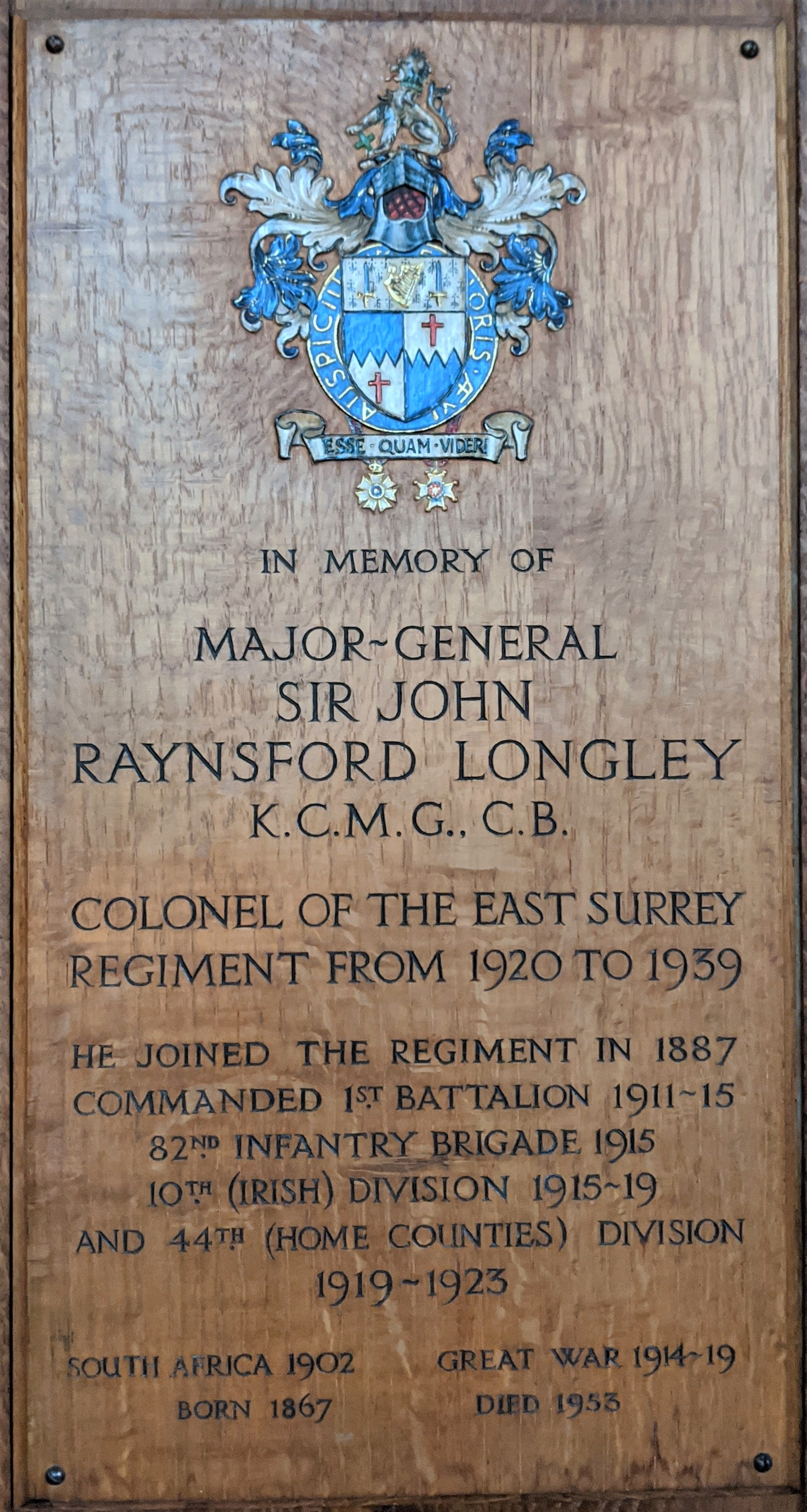
Memorial plaque to Major General Sir John Longley in All Saints Church, Kingston upon Thames, Surrey.

In July 1919, and with the war now over, Longley became the first GOC of the 44th (Home Counties) Division, a TF formation, before retiring from the army in June 1923.

From September 1920 to 1939 Longley held the colonelcy of the East Surrey Regiment, taking over from General Sir George Greaves.

Recalled at the start of the Second World War in September 1939, he was re-employed as a brigadier in the Dover Garrison.

He died on 13 February 1953, at the age of 85. The East Surrey Regimental chapel in All Saints Church, Kingston upon Thames, Surrey, has a memorial plaque to Longley and a stained glass window to the memory of both Longley and his son, killed in 1916 at the Battle of Jutland.

== Honours and awards ==
Knight Commander of the Order of St Michael and St George (KCMG)	6 June 1919
Companion of the Order of St Michael and St George (CMG)	31 May 1918
Companion of the Order of the Bath (CB)	1916
Grand Officer of the Order of the Nile (Egypt)	26 November 1919
Commander of the Order of Saints Maurice and Lazarus (Italy)	31 August 1917

Military offices
Preceded by Bryan Mahon	General Officer Commanding the 10th (Irish) Division; 1915–1919	Succeeded by George Gorringe
New title	General Officer Commanding 44th (Home Counties) Division; 1919–1923	Succeeded by Sir Henry Hodgson
