= 82nd Brigade (United Kingdom) =

Military unit

The 82nd Brigade was an infantry brigade formation of the British Army raised during World War I. It was originally formed from regular army infantry battalions serving away from home in the British Empire. It was assigned to the 27th Division and served on the Western Front and the Macedonian Front during the First World War.

John Longley commanded the brigade in 1915.

== Formation ==
The infantry battalions did not all serve at once, but all were assigned to the brigade during the war.

- 1st Battalion, Royal Irish Regiment
- 2nd Battalion, Duke of Cornwall's Light Infantry
- 2nd Battalion, Royal Irish Fusiliers
- 1st Battalion, Leinster Regiment
- 1/1st Battalion, Cambridgeshire Regiment
- 82nd Machine Gun Company
- 82nd Trench Mortar Battery
- 82nd SAA Section Ammunition Column
- 10th Battalion, Queen's Own Cameron Highlanders
- 2nd Battalion, Gloucestershire Regiment
- 10th Battalion, Hampshire Regiment

== Commanders ==
- 18 November 1914: Brigadier-General Lionel Stopford
- 9 January 1915: Lieutenant-Colonel John Longley (acting)
- 13 January 1915: Brigadier-General John Longley
- 20 December 1915: Brigadier-General Steuart Hare
- 13 January 1916: Lieutenant-Colonel John Mather (acting)
- 7 February 1916: Brigadier-General Steuart Hare
- 29 February 1916: Lieutenant-Colonel John Mather (acting)
- 13 March 1916: Brigadier-General Steuart Hare
- 1 April 1916: Brigadier-General C. R. I. Brooke
- 30 November 1916: Lieutenant-Colonel John Bailey (acting)
- 12 January 1917: Brigadier-General Charles Maynard
- 23 December 1917: Lieutenant-Colonel John Kirk (acting)
- 9 January 1918: Brigadier-General Richard Solly-Flood
- 25 September 1918: Brigadier-General Keith Davie
- 15 June 1919: Brigadier-General Philip Hanbury
- 29 July 1919: Lieutenant-Colonel Harry Edwards (acting)
- 12 August 1919: Lieutenant-Colonel Stanley Mathews (acting)
- 25 August 1919: Lieutenant-Colonel Arthur Dene (acting)
- 14 September 1919: Brigade disbanded
