= Charles Maynard (British Army officer) =

Major-General Sir Charles Maynard KCB CMG DSO
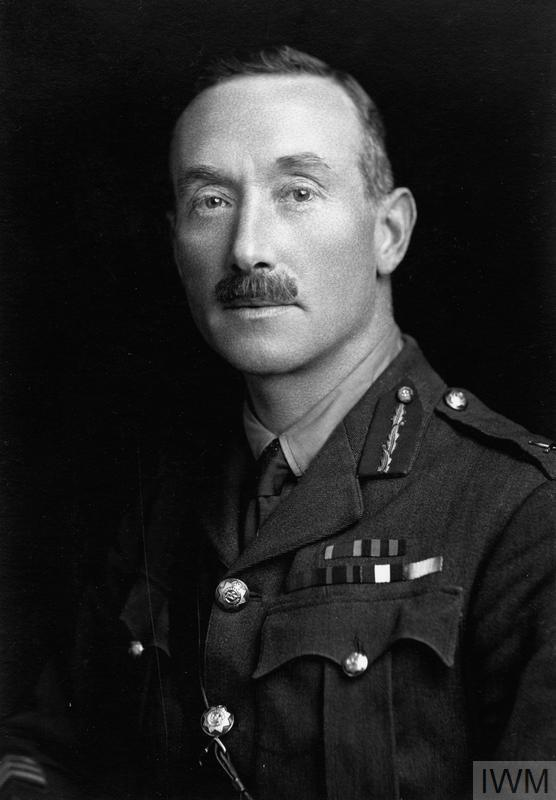
- Brigadier-General Maynard in 1918
- Born: Charles Clarkson Martin Maynard; 15 September 1870
- Died: 28 June 1945 (aged 74)
- Military career
- Service years: 1890–1925
- Rank: Major-General
- Unit: Devonshire Regiment
- Commands: 1st Battalion, Devonshire Regiment; 13th Infantry Brigade; 82nd Brigade; Allied Forces, Murmansk
- Conflicts: Burmese resistance Tirah campaign Second Boer War; First World War: Battle of La Bassée; North Russia intervention
- Awards: Distinguished Service Order (1900); Companion of the Order of St Michael and St George (1918); Companion of the Order of the Bath (1919); Knight Commander of the Order of St Michael and St George (1919)

Major-General Sir Charles Clarkson Martin Maynard, KCB, CMG, DSO (15 September 1870 – 28 June 1945) was a senior British Army officer, best known for his role in the North Russia intervention where he was General Officer Commanding Allied Forces, Murmansk (1918–1919). Having spent his early career in Burma and India, he also saw active service in the Second Boer War and the First World War.

== Early life and education ==
Maynard was born on 15 September 1870 in Rangoon, Burma, to Forster Fowler Martin Maynard, a physician. Having been awarded scholarships, he was educated at Colet Court and St Paul's School, London, both independent schools in England.

== Early military career ==
Maynard undertook officer training at the Royal Military College, Sandhurst, and then joined the Devonshire Regiment in October 1890. The following year, he was promoted to lieutenant and posted to Burma where he was given command of a mounted infantry unit. He saw active service during the Burmese resistance for which he was awarded the India General Service Medal with "Burma 1889–92" clasp. He returned to England and undertook the gymnastic course at Aldershot in 1894, and was then posted to Malta as Superintendent of Gymnasia. He was then posted to India where he was involved in the Tirah campaign, for which he received the India Medal with "Tirah 1897–98" clasp. He remained in India, and served as a railway transport officer and then as a station staff officer in the Punjab between 1898 and 1899. In February 1899, Maynard was promoted to captain and returned to England where he was posted to the 2nd Battalion, Devonshire Regiment.

In October 1899, he departed with his battalion to fight in the Second Boer War in South Africa. He remained in the country for the next three years, first serving on the front line. On 31 August 1900 he was granted the local rank of major whilst serving as second-in-command of the Imperial Light Infantry. He was then a staff officer specialising in press censorship from September 1901 until the end of the war in May 1902. He was mentioned in despatches three times and was awarded the Distinguished Service Order (DSO) in 1900. One of his mentions, in November 1900, was for his service as second-in-command of the Imperial Light Infantry. By the end of the war, he had qualified for the Queen's South Africa Medal with 6 clasps and the King's South Africa Medal with 2 clasps.

After returning to England from South Africa, Maynard attended the Staff College, Camberley, from 1903 to 1904. He was promoted from supernumerary captain to captain in February 1905. His first post after graduating was to be seconded for service on the staff to serve as brigade major of the 7th Infantry Brigade, Southern Command, between March 1905 and July 1907. From then on he served on the general staff at Army Headquarters, taking over the role of general staff officer, grade 3, or GSO3, from Major Thomas Marden.

He was in March 1910 made a GSO3 at the War Office (formerly Army Headquarters). and was promoted to brevet major on 23 July and again, this time to full major, on 2 November. One of his duties while attached to the War Office's directorate of military operations was "concerned with providing liaison with the Dominion forces in the event of a European war". In April 1911 he was upgraded from a GSO3 to a general staff officer, grade 2, or GSO2, still at the War Office, in succession to Brevet Colonel Charles Macpherson Dobell.

== First World War ==
During the First World War, he served in various staff and command appointments. Having re-joined his regiment, he was posted to France in August 1914 with the British Expeditionary Force as a company commander in the 1st Battalion, Devonshire Regiment. In September 1914, he returned to being a staff officer attached to the General Staff, with the appointment of "deputy assistant adjutant and quartermaster-general" for the 3rd Division. However, only one month later he took command of the 1st Battalion and led them during the Battle of La Bassée in October 1914. On 18 February 1915, he was promoted to brevet lieutenant colonel as a reward for "services rendered in connection with Operations in the Field". He then served as assistant quartermaster-general, first for the II Corps and then for the Third Army. In August 1915, he was once more given a command, this time of the 13th Infantry Brigade, 5th Division, and made a temporary brigadier general, taking over the brigade from Robert Wanless O'Gowan. However, he was soon taken ill, and although he returned to command his brigade briefly, he then took months away from the front-line to recover: without this illness, he was likely to have gone on to command a division.

Having recovered from his illness, Maynard was appointed to the staff of the British Salonika Army in August 1916, "for special liaison duties with the French". Having reverted back to the rank of lieutenant colonel, he was made a general staff officer 1st grade on 5 August 1916. In January 1917, after being promoted to brevet colonel, he was once more given a command as brigade commander of the 82nd Infantry Brigade and promoted to temporary brigadier general. After almost one year in command of the brigade, part of the 27th Division, on the Macedonian front with the British Salonika Army, he was once more taken ill and was invalided to England.

=== Russia ===
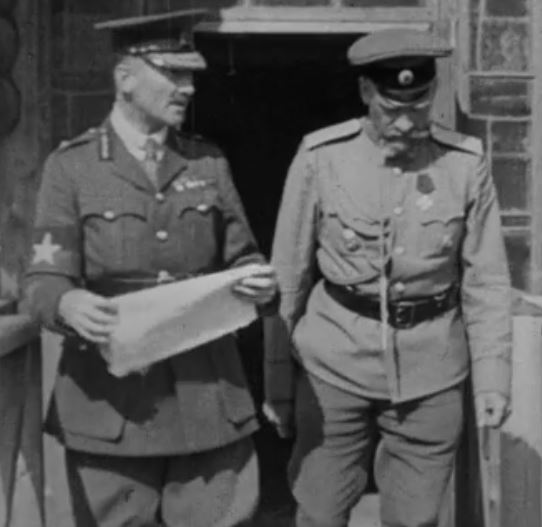
Maynard (left) with a White Russian general in 1919

After convalescing in England, Maynard was selected in May 1918 to command the Allied Land Forces at Murmansk as part of the North Russia intervention. He was promoted to temporary major-general on 24 May 1918. He served in North Russia from 23 June 1918 to 20 September 1919. His assignment was to protect the Russian coast from the advancing Germans and to act as a rallying point for the White Russians who were fighting in the Russian Civil War against the Bolsheviks. He arrived in Russia in June 1918 with approximately 600 men, and took command of a force consisting of 2,500 troops: the force was multi-national and included British, French, Finns, Russians, Poles, Serbs, and American personnel. Their main opposition was the 100,000 strong force under the command of Rüdiger von der Goltz, until the armistice of 11 November 1918.

Under his command, the troops secured Murmansk and extended inland to secure 10,000 square miles of Russian territory, setting up a system of defences and strong lines of communications. By July 1918, his troops controlled the Murmansk Railroad for 250 miles, reaching as far south as Belomorsk. They continued advancing during the 1918/1919 winter, reaching the town of Segezha. During the spring, they had advanced to 550 miles from Murmansk. He was promoted to substantive colonel on 2 June 1919, while maintaining the temporary rank of major-general. In September 1919, Maynard was once more taken ill, and returned home to England. The following month, the multi-national force, now under the command of Brigadier-General H. C. Jackson, evacuated from Murmansk ending their involvement in the region.

Maynard would go on to publish a book about his time in Russia, and summarised its unique scenario: "it was carried out by one of the most motley forces ever created for the purpose of military operations, and under climatic conditions never experienced previously by British troops".

== Later career ==
On 1 December 1919, Maynard relinquished the rank of major-general, having ceased to command the Allied Forces, Murmansk, thereby reverting to the rank of colonel. He was also placed on the half-pay list on the same date. Having recovered from his illness, he was appointed brigadier-in-charge (administration) at Western Command in 1920. He was promoted to substantive major general on 3 January 1923. He retired from the British Army on 25 July 1925 "on account of ill-health contracted on active service".

In September 1930 he succeeded Lieutenant General Sir Louis Bols as colonel of the Devonshire Regiment.

== Honours ==
Maynard was appointed Companion of the Distinguished Service Order (DSO) on 28 November 1900 "in recognition of the services [...] in connection with the Campaign in South Africa, 1899-1900". In the 1918 King's Birthday Honours, he was appointed Companion of the Order of St Michael and St George (CMG) "for services rendered in connection with Military Operations in Salonika". In the 1919 New Year Honours, he was appointed Companion of the Order of the Bath (CB) "for valuable services rendered in connection with Military Operations in North Russia". On 1 August 1919, he was promoted to Knight Commander of the Order of the Bath (KCB), also "for valuable services rendered in connection with Military operations in North Russia", and thereby granted the title sir. He was knighted by King George V during a ceremony at Buckingham Palace on 3 November 1919. By 1920, he had been appointed Commander (3rd class) of the Order of the White Eagle with swords by the King of the Serbs, Croats, and Slovenes.

== Personal life ==
In 1909, Maynard married Dorothy Agnes Davidson. Together they had one son and one daughter.

In retirement, Maynard wrote his memoires of the North Russia intervention and this was published as The Murmansk Venture in 1928. He held the honorary appointment of colonel of The Devonshire Regiment between 1930 and 1943.

Maynard died on 28 June 1945 in Bexhill, Sussex, England; he was aged 74.

== Selected works ==
- Major-General C. Maynard (1928). The Murmansk Venture. London: Hodder and Stoughton.
