= First Day =

First Day may refer to:

- The first day of the week
- First day of the month
- The first day of the Gregorian calendar, January 1, also known as New Year's Day
- First day of issue, the first day a postcard, postage stamp or stamped envelope is officially put up for sale
- The first day of the Genesis creation narrative (Old Testament of the Bible)

In entertainment:

- "First Day", song from the 2003 eponymous album The Futureheads
- "First Day", 2005 Timo Maas song
- "First Day", 2008 premier episode of The Inbetweeners
- "First Day", 2023 second episode of Gen V
- "First Day", an episode in season 2 of Regular Show
- First Day, a 2020 Australian children's television series
