= Edward Cooper (British Army officer) =

British Army general (1858–1945)

Major-General Edward Cooper CB DSO MVO
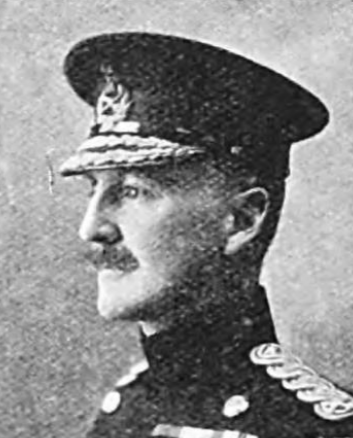
- Born: 21 April 1858
- Died: 8 March 1945 (aged 86)
- Relatives: Brigadier General Richard Joshua Cooper (cousin)
- Military career
- Allegiance: United Kingdom
- Branch: British Army
- Rank: Major-General
- Commands: British Troops in North China; 46th Brigade; 13th Brigade; 58th (2/1st London) Division
- Conflicts: Second Boer War; British expedition to Tibet; First World War
- Awards: Companion of the Order of the Bath; Distinguished Service Order; Member of the Royal Victorian Order

Major-General Edward Joshua Cooper, CB, DSO, MVO (21 April 1858 – 8 March 1945) was a senior British Army officer.

== Military career ==
Educated at Marlborough College and the Royal Military College, Sandhurst, Cooper was commissioned into the 99th (Lanarkshire) Regiment of Foot on 11 September 1876.

He saw action during the Relief of Ladysmith in 1900 in the Second Boer War, was promoted to lieutenant colonel, and the British expedition to Tibet in 1904.

He was promoted to brevet colonel on 28 November 1904 and placed on half-pay on 28 November 1905 after commanding a battalion of the Royal Fusiliers. He was made a substantive colonel in July 1907.

He went on to be commander of the troops in North China in 1910.

He was promoted to temporary brigadier general in August 1914 and again on 24 September and became commander of the 46th Brigade in around August 1915 and then commander of the 13th Brigade in December 1914 during the First World War. After that he became General Officer Commanding 58th (2/1st London) Division in 1915 before being placed on half-pay and reverting to his substantive rank in September 1916 before briefly being promoted once again to temporary brigadier general and commanding a brigade and, after being placed on half-pay in January 1918, retiring later that year.

Military offices
New title	GOC 58th (2/1st London) Division; 1915–1916	Succeeded by Hew Fanshawe
