= 1919 Birthday Honours =

British honours

The 1919 Birthday Honours were appointments by King George V to various orders and honours to reward and highlight good works by citizens of the British Empire. The appointments were made to celebrate the official birthday of The King, and were published in The London Gazette from 3 June to 12 August. The vast majority of the awards were related to the recently ended War, and were divided by military campaigns. A supplementary list of honours, retroactive to the King's birthday, was released in December 1919.

The massive list contained nearly 10,000 names, more than half of which were appointments to the Order of the British Empire. "The lists of awards to the Army are so long that only a part of the first section can be published to-day," reported The Times on 3 June. "This section fills 131 pages of the London Gazette." Admiral of the Fleet Sir David Beatty and Field Marshal Sir Douglas Haig were both appointed to the Order of Merit. As The Times noted, "The successful leadership of the victorious British Forces by land and sea is happily recognized by the award of the Order of Merit — which is limited in numbers to 24 — to Sir David Beatty and Sir Douglas Haig."

The new peers and baronets were not announced until August.

The recipients of honours are displayed here as they were styled before their new honour, and arranged by honour, with classes (Knight, Knight Grand Cross, etc.) and then divisions (Military, Civil, etc.) as appropriate.

== United Kingdom and British Empire ==
=== Earl ===
- Sir Edward Cecil Guinness, Viscount Iveagh KP GCVO Chancellor of the University of Dublin, 1908.

=== Baron ===
- Sir Edward Richard Russell JP Member of Parliament for Bridgeton Division of Glasgow, 1885–87; First Chairman of Liverpool Reform Club; Editor of the Liverpool Daily Post since 1869. For public services during a long career. By the name, style and title of Baron Russell of Liverpool, of Liverpool in the County Palatine of Lancaster.
- Col. William Hall Walker MP Member of Parliament for Widnes Division of Lancashire since 1900. Donor of a magnificent gift of Racehorses to the nation in 1916 in order to start a National Stud. For public and parliamentary Services. By the name, style, and title of Baron Wavertree of Delamere in the County of Chester.

=== Baronetcies ===
- Col. Harry Gilbert Barling CB FRCS JP Vice-Chancellor of Birmingham University. For public services.
- Sir John George Blaker. Three times Mayor of Brighton (1895–98); Chief Military representative for Brighton, area. For public and local services.
- John Arthur Brooke JP West Riding, Yorkshire, and County Ross. Very prominent and generous in all-religious and charitable movements in the Riding. For public and local services.
- Edward Clitherow Brooksbank JP Deputy-Chairman of Quarter Sessions; Vice-chairman of West Riding County Council; Chairman of Tadcaster Bench. Local Services.
- Coles Child MP DL JP During the War has been Chairman of West Kent War Pensions Committee, Special Grants Committee, and other War Committees. For public and local services.
- Cecil Herbert Edward Chubb. Presented Stonehenge to the nation, 1918. For public services.
- Captain Douglas Bernard Hall MP JP Justice of the Peace for Sussex; High Sheriff, Sussex, 1907. Started the first Hospital Barge Flotilla in the War, by which over 6,000 wounded were conveyed on rivers and canals in France. For public services.
- Sir Arthur Norman Hill. Chairman of the Port and Transit Executive Committee. Special War Services to the Ministry of Shipping.
- John Henry Holden. Mayor of Leigh for two years. Military representative for whole of Leigh area during the war. For public and local services.
- William Joynson-Hicks MP Raised 17th and 23rd Service Battalions, Middlesex Regiment. For public services.
- Lt.-Col. Alexander Leith MC DL JP Justice of the Peace for County of Northumberland. Food Commissioner for Northumberland and Durham. For public and local services.
- Laurence Richard Philipps JP Founder of Paraplegic Hospital in Wales. For public and local services.
- Sir Samuel Roberts DL MP Lord Mayor of Sheffield, 1899–1900. For public and local services.
- Sir Gerald Hemmington Ryan JP Justice of the Peace for Norfolk, Suffolk and London; President of Institute of Actuaries (1910–12); Chairman of Reform Club (1916–18). For public and local services.
- Col. Charles Edward Warde OBE MP DL JP For long continued public services in Kent.

=== Aide-de-camp ===
To be personal Aides-de-camp to the King:

- Col. His Royal Highness Edward A.C.G.A.P.D., Prince of Wales and Duke of Cornwall KG GCMG GBE MC Colonel-in-Chief, 12th Royal Lancers and Royal Scots Fusiliers
- Capt. His Royal Highness Prince Albert Frederick Arthur George KG Royal Air Force

=== Knight Bachelor ===
- John Baker Superintendent of the Broadmoor Lunatic Asylum
- Lt.-Col. John George Beharrell DSO Statistical Authority at the Ministry of Munitions and the Admiralty
- Robert Charles Brown FRCP FRCS Consulting Medical Officer of Preston Royal Infirmary. Has done much to promote Infant Welfare. Founded Scholarship for Research at Cambridge University. For public and local services.
- Henry Busby Bird JP Mayor of Shoreditch. Chairman of Local Appeal Committee and Local Food Committee. For public and local services.
- Isaac Connell, Secretary to the Scottish Chamber of Agriculture
- Harry Courthope-Munroe KC for valuable services at the Board of Trade
- Henry Capel Cure, Commercial Attaché, HM Embassy, Rome
- Charles Davidson, Deputy Chairman Establishment Committee, Ministry of Munitions
- Alderman George Edmund Davies JP Member of several Committees in connection with local affairs, and during the War served as Chairman of National Registration Act (1915) Committee. For Public and local services.
- Walter de Frece, for services rendered at the Ministry of Pensions
- Professor William Boyd Dawkins FRS Honorary Professor of Geology and Palaeontology in Victoria University, Manchester. Geologist on Geological Survey of Great Britain, 1861–69; Curator of the Manchester Museum, 1870; Consulting Geologist in questions of mining and civil engineering from 1870.
- Joseph Duveen. For public services, more particularly in connection with the extension of the Tate Gallery of British Art.
- Alderman Knowles Edge JP Justice of the Peace for County of Lancaster since 1904; Mayor of Bolton, 1917–18. For public and local services.
- George Fenwick JP Founder and Director of the New Zealand Press Association. For public services.
- Alderman Robert Vaughan Gower OBE FRGS Mayor of Tunbridge Wells, 1917–19. Has done much County work in many capacities. Chairman of Food Control Committee and National Service Representative for East and West Kent during the War. For local services.
- Cuthbert Cartwright Grundy JP President, Royal Cambrian Art Society; J.P. for County of Lancaster; Vice-president of Royal West of England Academy, Imperial Arts League, and South Wales Art Society. For public and local services.
- Thomas Henderson JP for Roxburghshire; Member of many local Committees during the War. For public and local services.
- John S. Henry, Voluntary Services in the Ministry of National Service
- Sydney George Higgins CBE Assistant Accountant-General, Ministry of Shipping
- Charles James Jackson JP FSA Well-known antiquarian, Barrister-at-law, author of leading text-books on gold and silver. Has rendered valuable assistance to the Red Cross.
- Leon Levison. Has rendered valuable work in connection with the Russian Jews' Relief Fund. For public services during the War.
- John Young Walker MacAlister FSA FRGS President of Library Association and Secretary of the Royal Society of Medicine. Formed, and acted as Secretary of, the War Office Surgical Advisory Committee. Organised the R.A.M.C. Bureau; Organised an Emergency Surgical Aid Corps for the Admiralty, War Office, and Metropolitan Police. For public services.
- William Maxwell. President of the International Co-operative Alliance and ex-President of the Scottish Co-operative Wholesale Society. For public services.
- John Charles Miles, Solicitor to the Ministry of Labour
- Henry Francis New, Mayor of St. Marylebone, 1917–19. Vice-president, Marylebone War Supply Hospital. Chairman of many War Committees. For public and local services.
- Francis George Newbolt KC for voluntary services in the Treasury Solicitors Department
- Julian Walter Orde, Secretary of the Royal Automobile Club. Has rendered exceptional services in providing for overseas officers during the War. For public services.
- James Wallace Paton JP Mayor of Southport, 1908–9. For public services.
- Major John Theodore Prestige. Working partner and Director of Messrs. J. Stone & Co.. Ltd., Engineers, Deptford. Founded 16th Battn. (Deptford) County of London Volunteer Regiment. For local services.
- Lt.-Col. Hugh Arthur Rose DSO Ex-Chairman of the Edinburgh School Board, chairman of the new Scottish Educational Authority, Food Commissioner for the East of Scotland
- Charles Tamlin Ruthen OBE Deputy Controller of Accommodation in HM Office of Works
- Douglas Shields, Administrator and Surgeon-in-Chief of Hospital at 17, Park Lane, which he gave free of charge for the use of the War Office.
- Thomas Sims CB Director of Works, Admiralty
- Alfred Waldron Smithers MP JP Chairman of the Grand Trunk Railway of Canada.
- Joshua Kelley Waddilove. Prominent Wesleyan leader and philanthropist. For public and local services.
- Francis Watson JP for Bradford. Member of Bradford City Council. Military representative, 1915–18. For local services.
- William Henry Wells, Chief Livestock Commission, Ministry of Food
- William Ireland de Courcy Wheeler FRCS Member of the Consultative Committee of the War Office. Surgeon to Household of His Excellency the Lord Lieutenant of Ireland. For public services during the War.
- William Howard Winterbotham, Official Solicitor since 1895
- Thomas Williams. General Manager, London and North-Western Railway. Member of Canals Committee and Port and Transport Committee.
- Col. Augustus Charles Woolley VD JP Appointed 1908 Honorary Lieutenant-Colonel of 1st Volunteer Battn., Royal Sussex Regiment, which he joined in 1887. For public and local services.
- Henry Arthur Wynne Chief Crown Solicitor for Ireland

British India

- Justice Abdur Rahim, Judge of the High Court of Judicature at Madras
- William Allan Ironside, Additional Member, Imperial Legislative Council
- Khan Zulfikar Ali Khan CSI of Maler Kotla, Additional Member of the Imperial Legislative Council
- Frank Willington Carter CIE CBE Additional Member of the Council of His Excellency the Governor of Bengal
- Col. Gerald Ponsonby Lenox-Conyngham, Royal Engineers, Superintendent of the Trigonometrical Survey, Dehra Dun, United Provinces
- Horace Charles Mules CSI MVO OBE Chairman of the Karachi Port Trust, Bombay
- Alfred Chatterton CIE Indian Educational Service, retired, Member of the Indian Industrial Commission
- James Allan Home, Controller of Munitions, Bombay

=== The Most Honourable Order of the Bath ===
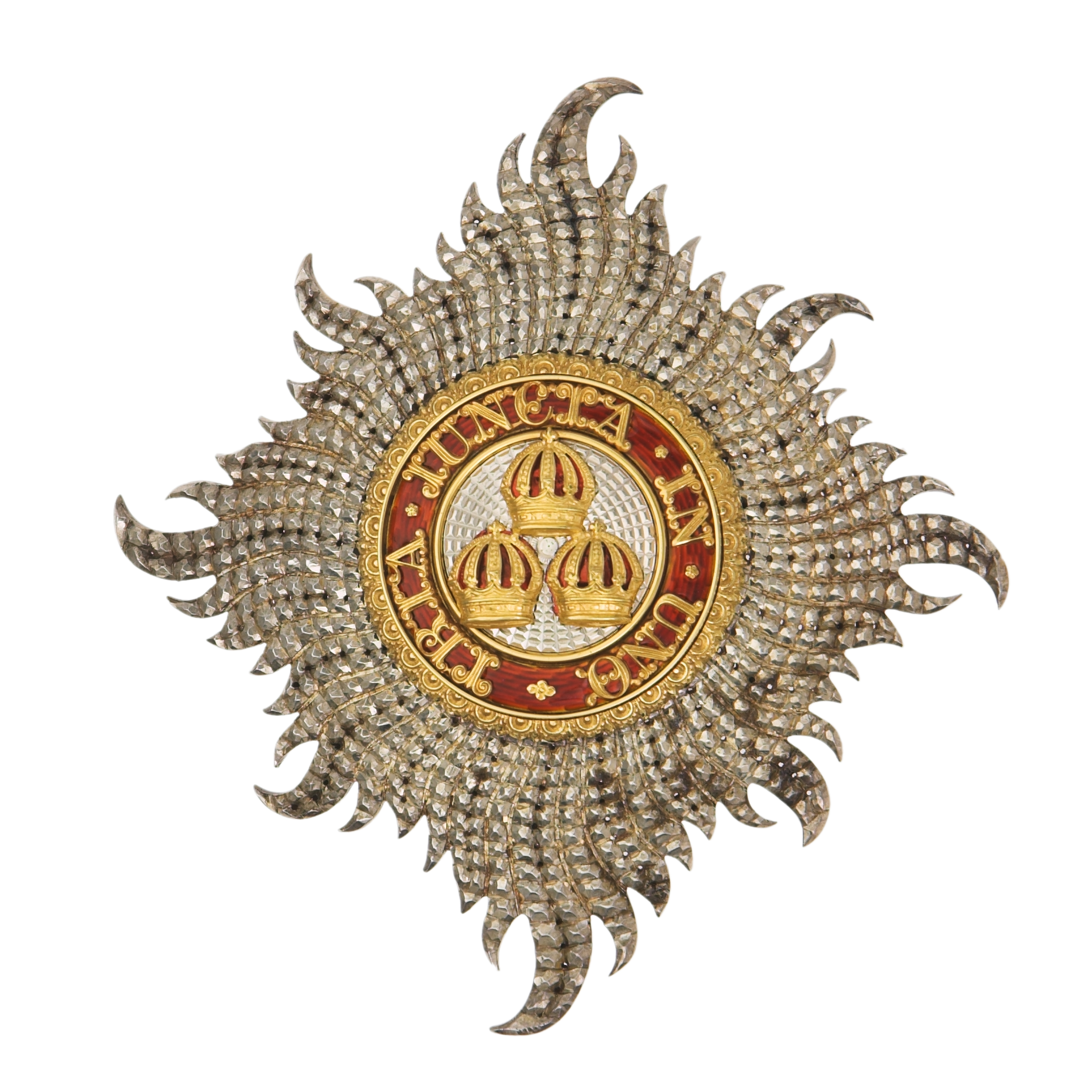
Civilian star of the Knight Grand Cross of the Order of the Bath

==== Knight Grand Cross of the Order of the Bath (GCB) ====
===== Civil Division =====
- Sir Reginald Herbert Brade KCB Secretary, War Office
- Sir Hubert Llewellyn Smith KCB Secretary, Board of Trade

==== Knight Commander of the Order of the Bath (KCB) ====
===== Military Division =====
In recognition of services during the War—

- Vice-Admiral Ernest Frederic Augustus Gaunt CB CMG
- Rear-Admiral Sir Richard Fortescue Phillimore KCMG CB MVO
- Maj.-Gen. Sir William Babtie VC KCMG CB KHS
- Maj.-Gen. Geoffrey Percy Thynne Feilding CB CMG DSO
- Maj.-Gen. Sir Arthur Lynden Lynden-Bell KCMG CB

For valuable services rendered in connection with military operations in the Balkans —

- Maj.-Gen. Sir William Henry Rycroft KCMG CB
- Maj.-Gen. Maurice Percy Cue Holt KCMG CB DSO

For valuable services rendered in connection with military operations in Egypt —

- Maj.-Gen. George de Symons Barrow KCMG CB
- Maj.-Gen. Arthur Reginald Hoskins CMG DSO

For valuable services rendered in connection with military operations in France and Flanders —

- Maj.-Gen. Hugh Bruce Williams CB DSO
- Maj.-Gen. Richard Philippe Lee CB CMG
- Maj.-Gen. Nevill Maskelyne Smyth VC CB
- Maj.-Gen. Reginald Walter Ralph Barnes CB DSO
- Maj.-Gen. Sir Richard Harte Keatinge Butler KCMG CB
- Maj.-Gen. Edward Peter Strickland CB CMG DSO
- Maj.-Gen. Philip Rynd Robertson CB CMG
- Maj.-Gen. Henry John Milnes Macandrew CB DSO
- Maj.-Gen. Cecil Lothian Nicholson CB CMG
- Maj.-Gen. Cecil Edward Pereira CB CMG
- Temp Maj.-Gen. Sir Anthony Alfred Bowlby KCMG KCVO CB FRCS

Canadian Forces

- Maj.-Gen. Frederick Oscar Warren Loomis CB CMG DSO

Australian Forces

- Maj.-Gen. John Gellibrand CB DSO
- Maj.-Gen. Thomas William Glasgow CB CMG DSO

For valuable services rendered in connection with military operations in Italy —

- Maj.-Gen. Sir James Melville Babington KCMG CB

===== Civil Division =====
- Basil Home Thomson CB Assistant Commissioner, Criminal Investigation Department, New Scotland Yard, Director, New Home Intelligence Department
- George Evelyn Pemberton Murray CB Secretary to the Post Office.
- John Anderson CB Secretary, Ministry of Shipping
- Norman Fenwick Warren Fisher CB Chairman of the Board of Inland Revenue
- Aubrey Vere Symonds CB For services rendered to the Local Government Board, especially in connection with the Housing Bill
- Charles Walker CB Accountant-General of the Navy
- John James Taylor CB Assistant Under-Secretary for Ireland and Clerk to the Irish Privy Council
- Stanley Mordaunt Leathes CB First Civil Service Commissioner
- Herbert James Creedy CB CVO Private Secretary, War Office

In recognition of services during the War—

- Rear-Admiral John Franklin Parry CB

==== Companion of the Order of the Bath (CB) ====
===== Military Division =====
For services rendered in connection with the War —

- Maj.-Gen. Walter Howorth Greenly CMG DSO
- Maj.-Gen. Layton John Blenkinsop DSO
- Col. and Hon Brig. Gen. Arthur John William Dowell CMG late Royal Berkshire Regiment
- Col. Henry Edmund Burleigh Leach late South Wales Borderers
- Lt.-Col. and Bt. Col. Arthur Blois Ross Hildebrand CMG DSO Royal Engineers
- Col. James Robert McMinn CMG late Royal Army Medical Corps
- Col. Claude Kyd Morgan CMG late Royal Army Medical Corps
- Maj. and Bt. Col. Malcolm Hammond Edward Welch CMG Royal Irish Rifles
- Lt.-Col. and-Bt. Col. William Henry Bartholomew CMG DSO Royal Artillery
- Lt.-Col. and Bt. Col. Arthur Lisle Ambrose Webb CMG Royal Army Medical Corps
- Lt.-Col. and Bt. Col. Sir Edward Scott Worthington Kt KCVO CMG Royal Army Medical Corps
- Maj. and Bt. Lt.-Col. Robert Emile Shepherd Prentice CMG DSO Highland Light Infantry
- Maj. and Bt. Lt.-Col. Richard Knox Walsh CMG DSO Royal Scots Fusiliers
- Engineer Rear-Admiral Charles John James
- Paymaster Rear-Admiral William Marcus Charles Beresford Whyte CMG
- Lt.-Col. George James Herbert Mullins, Royal Marine Light Infantry
- Capt. Charles Penrose Rushton Coode DSO RN
- Capt. Alfred Dudley Pickman Rogers Pound RN
- Capt. Oliver Elles Leggett RN
- Surgeon Capt. William John Colborne RN
- Paymaster Capt. George James Clow RN
- Maj.-Gen. Francis Ventris
- Col. Malcolm Sydenham Clarke Campbell CIE late Royal Artillery
- Maj. and Bt. Lt.-Col. William Alexander CMG DSO Royal Highlanders

In recognition of distinguished services during the War—

- Maj.-Gen. John Frederick Andrews Higgins DSO AFC Royal Artillery
- Col. Henry Robert Moore Brooke-Popham CMG DSO AFC Oxfordshire and Buckinghamshire Light Infantry
- Col. Charles Laverock Lambe CMG DSO
- Col. Tom Ince Webb-Bowen CMG Bedfordshire Regiment
- Col. Francis Leycester Festing CMG Northumberland Fusiliers

Canadian Forces

- Col. John Alexander Gunn OBE Canadian Army Medical Corps
- Col. Charles Fenwick Wylde, Canadian Army Medical Corps

For valuable services rendered in connection with military operations in the Balkans —

- Col. William Ernest Fairholme CMG MVO late Royal Artillery

For valuable services rendered in connection with military operations in France and Flanders —

- Maj.-Gen. Neill Malcolm DSO
- Col. and Hon Brig. Gen. Robert Kellock Scott CMG DSO Royal Army Ordnance Corps
- Col. Archibald Kennedy Seccombe CMG DSO late Royal Army Service Corps
- Temp Col. William Pasteur CMG FRCP Army Medical Service
- Temp Lt.-Col. Sir Smith Hill Child Bt CMG DSO MVO Royal Field Artillery late Irish Guards
- Lt.-Col. and Bt. Col. Charles Edward Corkran CMG Grenadier Guards
- Lt.-Col. and Bt. Col. Hon Walter Patrick Hore-Ruthven, Master of Ruthven CMG DSO Scots Guards
- Maj. and Bt. Col. Archibald Fraser Home CMG DSO 11th Hussars
- Col. Stevenson Lyle Cummins CMG late Royal Army Medical Corps
- Col. Robert James Goodall Elkington CMG DSO late Royal Artillery
- Col. Hubert Alaric Bray CMG late Royal Army Medical Corps
- Col. Robert James Blackham CMG CIE DSO late Royal Army Medical Corps
- Lt.-Col. and Bt. Col. James Arbuthnot Tyler CMG Royal Artillery
- Col. John Ambard Bell-Smyth CMG late Dragoon Guards
- Lt.-Col. and Bt. Col. Kempster Kenmure Knapp CMG Royal Artillery
- Lt.-Col. Harold Collinson CMG DSO FRCS Royal Army Medical Corps
- Lt.-Col. and Bt. Col. Edwin Francis Delaforce CMG Royal Artillery
- Lt.-Col. Arthur Birtwistle CMG DSO Royal Field Artillery
- Lt.-Col. and Bt. Col. John Spencer Ollivant CMG DSO Royal Artillery
- Temp Lt.-Col. Frank Percy Crozier CMG DSO New Armies
- Maj. and Bt. Col. Alexander Gavin Stevenson CMG DSO Royal Engineers
- Lt.-Col. and Bt. Col. Roger Henry Massie CMG Royal Artillery
- Maj. and Bt. Col. Alexander Walter Frederic Baird CMG DSO Gordon Highlanders
- Lt.-Col. and Bt. Col. William Breck Lesslie CMG Royal Engineers
- Maj. and Bt. Col. John Bartholomew Wroughton CMG Royal Sussex Regiment
- Lt.-Col. and Bt. Col. Leopold Charles Louis Oldfield CMG DSO Royal Artillery
- Lt.-Col. and Bt. Col. Alfred Henry Ollivant CMG Royal Artillery
- Lt.-Col. and Bt. Col. George Standish Gage Crawfurd CMG CIE DSO ADC Gordon Highlanders
- Lt.-Col. and Bt. Col. Stratford Watson Robinson DSO Royal Artillery
- Lt.-Col. and Bt. Col. Harold Fargus CMG DSO Duke of Cornwall's Light Infantry
- Lt.-Col. and Bt. Col. Edward Massy Birch CMG DSO Royal Artillery
- Maj. and Bt. Col. Arthur Henry Marindin DSO Royal Highlanders
- Maj. and Bt. Col. James Walter Sandilands CMG DSO Cameron Highlanders
- Lt.-Col. and Bt. Col. Alphonse Eugène Panet CMG DSO Royal Engineers
- Maj. Richard Mildmay Foot CMG DSO
- Maj. and Bt. Col. Berkeley Vincent CMG 6th Dragoons
- Lt.-Col. and Bt. Col. Antony Ernest Wentworth Harman DSO 18th Hussars
- Col. Frank George Mathias Rowley CMG DSO late Middlesex Regiment
- Maj. and Bt. Col. Frank William Ramsay CMG DSO Middlesex Regiment
- Lt.-Col. Lawrence Joseph Chapman CMG Royal Garrison Artillery
- Lt.-Col. Cyril Eustace Palmer CMG DSO Royal Artillery
- Lt.-Col. George Birnie Mackenzie CMG DSO Royal Artillery
- Lt.-Col. Philip Wheatley CMG DSO Royal Artillery
- Lt.-Col. Cuthbert Evans CMG DSO Royal Artillery
- Lt.-Col. Percy Morris Robinson CMG Royal West Kent Regiment
- Lt.-Col. Arthur Thackeray Beckwith CMG DSO Hampshire Regiment
- Lt.-Col. Ormonde de l'Épée Winter CMG DSO Royal Artillery
- Lt.-Col. and Bt. Col. Francis James Marshall CMG DSO Seaforth Highlanders
- Maj. and Bt. Lt.-Col. Charles Edensor Heathcote CMG DSO Yorkshire Light Infantry
- Maj. and Bt. Lt.-Col. Alfred Ernest Irvine CMG DSO Durham Light Infantry
- Maj. and Bt. Lt.-Col. Charles Harry Lyon CMG DSO North Staffordshire Regiment
- Temp Lt.-Col. Francis Edward Metcalfe CMG DSO New Armies.
- Capt. and Bt. Col. Hugh Keppel Bethell CMG DSO 7th Hussars
- Maj. and Bt. Lt.-Col. Bertie Gordon Clay CMG DSO 7th Dragoon Guards
- Maj. and Bt. Lt.-Col. George Edmund Reginald Kenrick CMG DSO Royal West Surrey Regiment
- Maj. and Bt. Lt.-Col. George William St. George Grogan VC CMG DSO Worcestershire Regiment
- Maj. and Bt. Lt.-Col. Claude-Raul Champion de Crespigny CMG DSO Grenadier Guards
- Maj. and Bt. Col. Henry Cholmondeley Jackson DSO Bedfordshire Regiment
- Maj. and Bt. Lt.-Col. Adrian Carton de Wiart VC CMG DSO 4th Dragoon Guards
- Lt.-Col. Hon Alexander Gore-Arkwright Hore-Ruthven VC CMG DSO Welsh Guards
- Maj. and Bt. Col. Reginald Seaburne May CMG DSO Royal Fusiliers
- Temp Col. William Taylor FRCSI

Canadian Forces

- Maj.-Gen. William Bethune Lindsay CMG DSO Canadian Engineers
- Brig. Gen. Herbert Cyril Thacker CMG DSO Canadian Field Artillery
- Brig. Gen. John Fletcher Leopold Embury CMG Saskatchewan Regiment
- Brig. Gen. Edward Hilliam CMG DSO Nova Scotia Regiment
- Brig. Gen. Raymond Brutinel CMG DSO Canadian Machine Gun Corps

Australian Force

- Col. James Campbell Robertson CMG DSO
- Col. William Livingstone Hatchwell Burgess CMG DSO Australian Field Artillery
- Col. Hon Angus McDonnell CMG Canadian Railway Service
- Col. Raymond Lionel Leane
- Col. Edward Fowell Martin CMG DSO
- Col. George Walter Barber CMG DSO Australian Army Medical Corps
- Lt.-Col. Herbert William Lloyd CMG DSO Australian Field Artillery
- Lt.-Col. Edmund Alfred Drake-Brockman CMG DSO 16th Battalion, Australian Imperial Force

New Zealand Forces

- Lt.-Col. Herbert Ernest Hart CMG DSO Wellington Regiment
- Lt.-Col. Charles William Melvill CMG DSO NZ Rifle Brigade
- Lt.-Col. Robert Young CMG DSO Canterbury Regiment

South African Forces

- Lt.-Col. William Ernest Collins Tanner CMG DSO 2nd SA Infantry

For valuable services rendered in connection with military operations in Italy —

- Col. Thomas du Bedat Whaite CMG late Royal Army Medical Corps
- Lt.-Col. and Bt. Col. William Heape Kay DSO Royal Artillery
- Col. John Vincent Forrest CMG late Royal Army Medical Corps
- Lt.-Col. and Bt. Col. Henry Calvert Stanley-Clarke CMG DSO Royal Artillery
- Maj. and Bt. Col. Henry Clifford Rodes Green CMG DSO King's Royal Rifle Corps
- Maj. and Bt. Col. Walter William Pitt-Taylor CMG DSO Rifles Brig
- Lt.-Col. and Bt. Col. Arthur Chopping CMG Royal Army Medical Corps
- Lt.-Col. Ransom Pickard CMG Royal Army Medical Corps
- Maj. and Bt. Lt.-Col. Gerald Carew Sladen CMG DSO MC Rifle Brigade
- Maj. and Bt. Lt.-Col. Bertram John Lang CMG DSO Argyll and Sutherland Highlanders
- Maj. and Bt. Lt.-Col. Raymond Theodore Pelly CMG DSO North Lancashire Regiment
- Temp Capt. George Lethbridge Colvin CMG DSO

For valuable services rendered in connection with military operations in Mesopotamia

- Col. William Embank CIE Royal Engineers
- Lt.-Col. and Bt. Col. Leslie Cockburn Jones CMG MVO 7th Lancers, Indian Army
- Col. Herbert Edward Stockdale CMG DSO late Royal Artillery
- Col. Arthur Forbes CMG Royal Army Ordnance Corps
- Lt.-Col. and Bt. Col. George Mortimer Morris DSO 62nd Punjabis, Indian Army

===== Civil Division =====
- Robert Russell Scott CSI Admiralty Establishments
- Gilbert Edmund Augustine Grindle CMG Assistant Under-Secretary of State for the Colonies
- Robert John Grote Mayor, Principal Assistant Secretary (Universities), Board of Education
- Colville Adrian de Rune Barclay CBE Counsellor of HM Embassy, Washington
- Ernest John Strohmenger, Deputy Accountant-General, Ministry of Shipping
- Sydney John Chapman CBE Senior Assistant Secretary, Gen. Economic Department, Board of Trade
- Gilbert Charles Upcott, Principal Clerk, Treasury
- John Arthur Corcoran, Assistant Secretary, War Office
- John Alfred Ernest Dickinson ISO Housing Department, Local Government Board
- Gerald Arthur Steel, Admiralty
- John Reeve Brooke, Assistant Secretary, Ministry of Food
- Maj. Anthony Caccia MVO Secretary to the British Section of the Supreme War Council of Versailles
- Robert Welsh Branthwaite Board of Control
- Edward Aremberg Saunderson, Private Secretary to the Lord Lt. of Ireland
- David Currie, Director-Gen. of National Salvage, Ministry of Munitions

For services in connection with the War —

- Bt. Lt.-Col. Arthur Stanley Redman
- Col. Edwin Charles Seaman CMG
- Sir Frank Forbes Adam CIE DL Chairman, East Lancashire T.F. Association
- Col. William Lambert White VD DL Chairman, East Riding T.F. Association
- Col. William Smith Gill VD Chairman, Aberdeen City T.F. Association
- William Henderson, chairman, Dundee City T.F. Association
- Lt.-Col. Geoffrey Fowell Buxton VD DL Vice-chairman, Norfolk T.F. Association
- Capt. Charles Barrington Balfour, President and chairman, Berwickshire T.F. Association
- Col. Right Hon Lord Richard Frederick Cavendish CMG Vice-chairman, West Lancashire T.F. Association
- Col. John Edward Mellor DL Chairman, Denbigh T.F. Association
- Col. St. Clair Oswald DL Chairman, Fifeshire T.F. Association
- Rear-Admiral Edmund Hyde Smith
- Rear-Admiral Sir Arthur John Henniker-Hughan Bt
- Surgeon Rear-Admiral Alexander Gascoigne Wildey
- Col. Gunning Morehead Campbell, Royal Marine Artillery
- Capt. John Knox Laird RN
- Capt. Frederick Charles Ulick Vernon Wentworth RN
- Surgeon Capt. George Trevor Collingwood MVO RN
- Paymaster Commander Thompson Horatio Millett RN

=== The Most Exalted Order of the Star of India ===
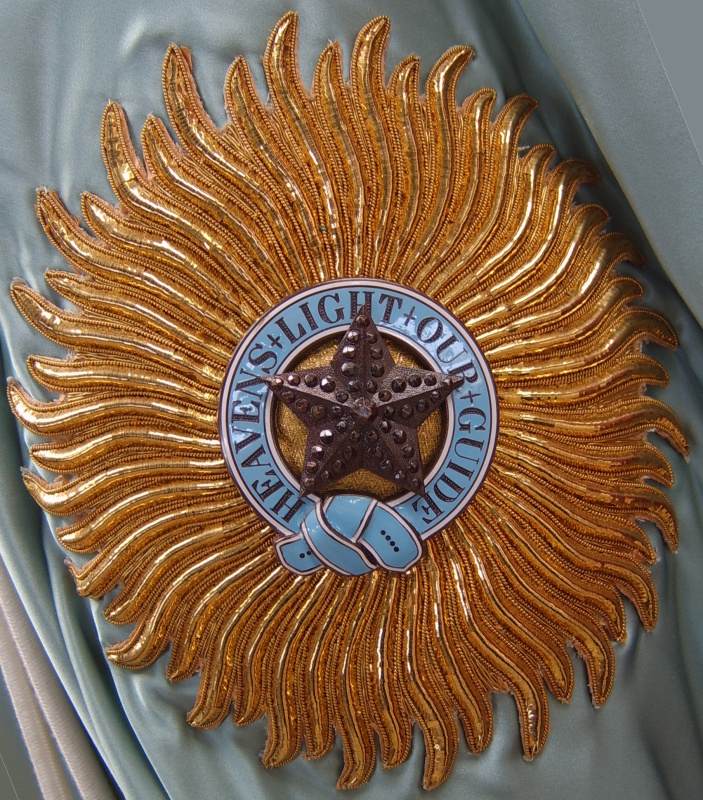
Star of a Knight Grand Commander of the Most Exalted Order of the Star of India

==== Knight Grand Commander (GCSI) ====
- His Excellency Gen. Sir Charles Carmichael Monro GCB GCMG ADC Commander-in-Chief in India
- His Highness Maharao Raja Sir Raghubir Singh Bahadur GCIE GCVO KCSI of Bundi, Rajputana
- George Carmichael CSI Indian Civil Service, Member of the Council of His Excellency the Governor, Bombay
- Michael Ernest Sadler CB Chairman of Calcutta University Commission

==== Knight Commander (KCSI) ====
For services in, and in connection, with, the military operations in Mesopotamia —

- Maj.-Gen. Sir Harry Triscott Brooking KCB KCMG
- Maj.-Gen. Sir George Fletcher MacMunn KCB CSI DSO Inspector-General of Communications

==== Companion (CSI) ====
- Patrick Robert Cadell CIE Indian Civil Service, Chief Secretary to the Government of Bombay
- Lt.-Col. Montagu William Douglas CIE Indian Army, Chief Commissioner of the Andamans
- Reginald Arthur Mant, Indian Civil Service
- Manubhai Nandshankar Mehta, Minister of the Baroda State
- Richard Meredith CIE Chief Engineer, Telegraphs
- Col. Charles Mactaggart CIE Indian Medical Service, Inspector-General of Civil Hospitals, United Provinces
- Hugh Lansdown Stephenson CIE Indian Civil Service, Magistrate and Collector, Bengal
- John Perronet Thompson, Indian Civil Service, Chief Secretary to the Government of the Punjab

For services in, and in connection, with, the military operations in Mesopotamia —

- Col. Alexander John Henry Swiney CB CMG Indian Army
- Bt. Col. James Wilton O'Dowda CB CMG Royal Dublin Fusiliers
- Col. Frederic George Lucas CB DSO Indian Army
- Bt. Lt.-Col. Arnold Talbot Wilson CMG CIE DSO Indian Army
- Lt.-Col. and Bt. Col. Charles Ernest Graham Norton ADC 7th Hussars

For meritorious services connected with the War —

- Lt.-Col. Thomas Wolseley Haig CMG Political Department, His Britannic Majesty's Consul-Gen., Ispahan
- Herman Charles Norman CBE Counsellor, His Britannic Majesty's Embassy, Tokyo, Japan

=== Order of Merit (OM) ===
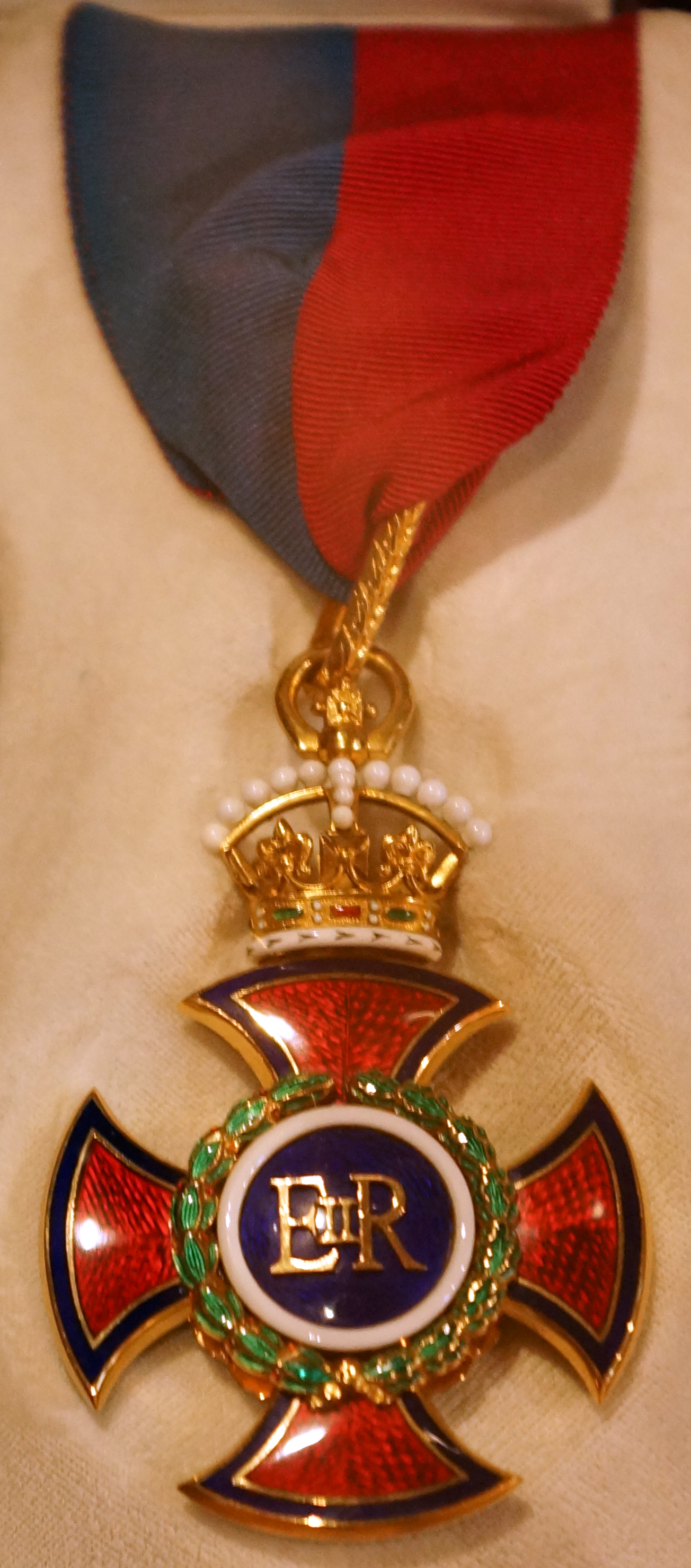
The riband and badge of the Order of Merit

- Admiral of the Fleet Sir David Beatty GCB GCVO DSO
- Field Marshal Sir Douglas Haig KT GCB GCVO KCIE

=== The Most Distinguished Order of Saint Michael and Saint George ===
Star of the Order of Saint Michael and Saint George

==== Knight Grand Cross of the Order of St Michael and St George (GCMG) ====
Diplomatic Service and Overseas List

- Sir Richard Frederick Crawford KCMG KBE Commercial Adviser to His Majesty's Embassy at Washington

Colonies, Protectorates, etc.

- Sir Francis Henry May KCMG lately Governor and Commander-in-Chief of the Colony of Hong Kong

For services rendered in connection with the War —

- Admiral the Hon Sir Stanley Cecil James Colville GCVO KCB
- Admiral Sir Thomas Henry Martyn Jerram KCB KCMG
- Gen. Sir William Robert Robertson GCB KCVO DSO ADC

For services rendered in connection with military operations in the Balkans —

- Lt.-Gen. Sir George Francis Milne KCB KCMG DSO

For services rendered in connection with military operations in Egypt —

- Lt.-Gen. Sir Henry George Chauvel KCB KCMG

For services rendered in connection with military operations in France and Flanders —

- Lt.-Gen. Sir Hubert de la Poer Gough KCB KCVO

For services rendered in connection with military operations in Italy —

- Lt.-Gen. Frederick Lambart, Earl of Cavan KP KCB MVO

For services rendered in connection with military operations in Mesopotamia —

- Lt.-Gen. William Raine Marshall KCB KCSI

==== Knight Commander of the Order of St Michael and St George (KCMG) ====
Diplomatic Service and Overseas List

- John Anthony Cecil Tilley CB Chief Clerk of the Foreign Office
- Stephen Leech, His Majesty's Envoy Extraordinary and Minister Plenipotentiary at Havana
- Robert Follett Synge CMG MVO Deputy Marshal of the Ceremonies
- Ian Zachary Malcolm MP Parliamentary Private Secretary to the Secretary of State for Foreign Affairs

Colonies, Protectorates, etc.

- Cecil Hunter-Rodwell CMG Governor and Commander-in-Chief of the Colony of Fiji, and His Majesty's High Commissioner for the Western Pacific
- Reginald Edward Stubbs CMG Governor and Commander-in-Chief designate of the Colony of Hong Kong
- The Honourable George Warburton Fuller, Colonial Secretary, State of New South Wales
- Sir John Langdon Bonython Kt CMG for services to the Commonwealth of Australia
- The Honourable Sir John McCall Kt Agent-Gen. in London for the State of Tasmania
- Edmond Howard Lacam Gorges CMG MVO Administrator of German South West Africa

For services rendered in connection with the War —

- Maj.-Gen. William Geoffrey Hanson Salmond CB DSO Royal Artillery
- Admiral Ernest Charles Thomas Troubridge CB CMG MVO
- Rear-Admiral George Price Webley Hope CB
- Rear-Admiral Rudolf Walter Bentinck CB
- Rear-Admiral Charles Martin de Bartolomé CB
- Maj.-Gen. Philip Geoffrey Twining CB CMG MVO
- Maj. and Bt. Col. Borlase Elward Wyndham Childs CB CMG
- Maj.-Gen. Sir Frederick Spencer Robb KCB KCVO
- Maj.-Gen. Percy Pollexfen de Blaquiere Radcliffe CB DSO
- Maj. and Bt. Col. Robert Hutchison CB DSO 4th Dragoon Guards

Australian Force

- Maj.-Gen. Sir Neville Reginald Howse VC KCB
- Col. Henry Carr Maudsley CMG CBE

For services rendered in connection with military operations in the Aden Peninsula —

- Maj.-Gen. James Marshall Stewart CB

For services rendered in connection with military operations in the Balkans —

- Maj.-Gen. Hubert Armine Anson Livingstone CB CMG
- Maj.-Gen. William Henry Onslow CB CMG

For services rendered in connection with military operations in Egypt —

- Hon Col. Charles Loftus Bates CB CMG DSO
- Col. Richard Harman Luce CB CMG FRCS Army Medical Service
- Maj.-Gen. John Raynsford Longley CB CMG
- Maj.-Gen. William George Balfour Western CB
- Maj.-Gen. Steuart Welwood Hare CB
- Maj.-Gen. Henry West Hodgson CB CVO

For services rendered in connection with military operations in France and Flanders —

- Maj.-Gen. Sir Herbert Edward Watts KCB CMG
- Maj.-Gen. Reginald Ford CB CMG DSO
- Temp Col. William Tindall Lister CMG FRCS
- Temp Maj.-Gen. Cuthbert Sidney Wallace CB CMG
- Maj.-Gen. Henry Neville Thompson CB CMG DSO
- Maj.-Gen. Herbert Crofton Campbell Uniacke CB CMG
- Maj.-Gen. Sir Cameron Deane Shute KCB CMG
- Lt.-Col. Joseph Frederick Laycock CMG DSO Royal Horse Artillery
- Temp Lt.-Col. Brodie Haldane Henderson CB CMG Royal Engineers
- Maj.-Gen. Reginald Ulick Henry Buckland CB CMG
- Col. and Hon Maj.-Gen. John Moore CB CMG FRCVS
- Lt.-Gen. Sir Henry de Beauvoir De Lisle KCB DSO
- Lt.-Gen. Sir Arthur Edward Aveling Holland KCB DSO MVO
- Maj.-Gen. Sir Robert Dundas Whigham KCB DSO
- Maj.-Gen. Harold Goodeve Ruggles-Brise CB MVO
- Maj.-Gen. Arnold Frederick Sillem CB
- Maj.-Gen. William Andrew Liddell CB
- Maj.-Gen. William Thwaites CB
- Temp Maj.-Gen. Sir Wilmot Parker Herringham CB
- Col. Simon Joseph Fraser, Lord Lovat KCVO CB DSO
- Lt.-Col. and Bt. Col. Sydney D'Aguilar Crookshank CB CIE DSO MVO Royal Engineers
- Temp Lt.-Col. Henry Percy Maybury CB Royal Engineers

Canadian Forces

- Maj.-Gen. Edward Whipple Bancroft Morrison CB CMG DSO
- Maj.-Gen. Sir Henry Edward Burstall KCB CMG ADC

For services rendered in connection with military operations in Italy —

- Maj.-Gen. Foster Reuss Newland CB CMG
- Maj.-Gen. Sir Harold Bridgwood Walker KCB DSO

For services rendered in connection with military operations in Mesopotamia —

- Maj.-Gen. Webb Gillman CB CMG DSO

==== Companion of the Order of St Michael and St George (CMG) ====
Diplomatic Service and Overseas List

- Robert Henry Clive, First Secretary at His Majesty's Legation at Stockholm
- The Right Honourable the Earl of Drogheda, lately of the Foreign Office
- The Lord Kilmarnock, First Secretary at His Majesty's Legation at Copenhagen
- Walter James Williamson, Financial Adviser to the Siamese Government
- Henry Maclean, Honorary Attaché to His Majesty's Legation at Tehran

Colonies, Protectorates, etc.

- The Honourable George Thomas Collins, Member of the Legislative Council, State of Tasmania
- Steuart Spencer Davis, Treasurer, German East Africa
- Lt.-Col. William Dixon, Royal Marine Artillery, Officer Administering the Government of Saint Helena
- Walter Devonshire Ellis, of the Colonial Office
- de Symons Montagu George Honey, Resident Commissioner, Swaziland
- John William Tyndale McClellan, Provincial Commissioner, East Africa Protectorate
- Richard Sims Donkin Rankine, Receiver-General, Fiji
- Alfred Allen Simpson, late Mayor of the City of Adelaide, State of South Australia
- Frank Braybrook Smith, Secretary, Department of Agriculture, Union of South Africa
- Herbert Warington Smyth, Secretary, Department of Mines and Industries, Union of South Africa

For services rendered in connection with the War —

- Maj.-Gen. Robert Porter CB Ret. pay
- Col. Montagu Grant Wilkinson CB MVO Ret. pay
- Col. William Hely Bowes CB Royal Scots Fusiliers
- Col. Fiennes Henry Crampton CB Royal Artillery
- Col. Godfrey Leicester Hibbert CB DSO late Royal Lancaster Regiment
- Col. George Harvey Nicholson CB late Hampshire Regiment
- Col. Edward Humphry Bland CB late Royal Engineers
- Col. Thomas Arthur Hastings Biggs CB late Royal Engineers
- Col. John William Gascoigne Roy, late Nottinghamshire and Derbyshire Regiment
- Lt.-Col. and Bt. Col. William St Colum Bland CB Royal Artillery
- Col. Burleigh Francis Brownlow Stuart CB late Worcestershire Regiment
- Lt.-Col. and Bt. Col. William Knapp Tarver CB Royal Army Service Corps
- Lt.-Col. and Bt. Col. Reginald St. George Gorton, Royal Artillery
- Lt.-Col. and Bt. Col. Wilfred Marriott-Dodington, Oxfordshire and Buckinghamshire Light Infantry
- Lt.-Col. Sir James Kingston Fowler KCVO FRCP Royal Army Medical Corps
- Lt.-Col. Andrew Alexander Watson DSO Royal Army Medical Corps, Special Reserve
- Temp Lt.-Col. Percy William George Sargent DSO FRCS Royal Army Medical Corps
- Lt.-Col. Alexander Morrison McIntosh FRCS Royal Army Medical Corps
- Maj. and Bt. Col. Ivo Lucius Beresford Vesey DSO Royal West Surrey Regiment
- Maj. and Bt. Lt.-Col. Rudolf George Jelf DSO King's Royal Rifle Corps
- Maj. and Bt. Lt.-Col. Charles Graeme Higgins DSO Oxfordshire and Buckinghamshire Light Infantry
- Lt.-Col. Albert George Teeling Cusins, Royal Engineers
- Maj. and Bt. Lt.-Col. George Windsor Clive, Coldstream Guards
- Maj. and Bt. Lt.-Col. Cecil John Lyons Allanson CIE DSO 6th Gurkha Rifles, Indian Army
- Maj. and Bt. Lt.-Col. Hugh Wharton Middleton Watson DSO King's Royal Rifle Corps
- Maj. and Bt. Lt.-Col. Frank Valiant Temple, Royal Marine Light Infantry
- Capt. Vernon Harry Stuart Haggard RN
- Capt. Alan Geoffrey Hotham RN
- Capt. Charles William Rawson Royds RN
- Capt. Herbert Arthur Buchanan-Wollaston RN
- Commander Joseph Man RN OBE
- Paymaster Commander William Frederick Cullinan RN
- Paymaster Commander Victor Herbert Thomas Weekes RN CB
- Col. Harry Douglas Farquharson, Royal Marine Light Infantry
- Lt.-Col. John Bruce Finlaison, Royal Marine Light Infantry
- Maj. and Bt. Lt.-Col. Hugh Ferguson Montgomery, Royal Marine Light Infantry DSO
- Maj. Joseph Arthur Myles Ariel Clark, Royal Marine Light Infantry
- Col. John Miles Steel CBE
- Col. Edward Alexander Dimsdale Masterman CBE AFC
- Col. Henry Percy Smyth-Osbourne
- Col. Frederick Crosby Halahan DSO MVO
- Col. Percy Robert Clifford Groves DSO Shropshire Light Infantry
- Lt.-Col. Roland Cecil Sneyd Hunt
- Lt.-Col. Charles Rumney Samson DSO AFC
- Lt.-Col. Edgar Rainey Ludlow-Hewitt DSO MC Royal Irish Rifles
- Lt.-Col. Ulick John Deane Bourke, Oxfordshire and Buckinghamshire Light Infantry
- Lt.-Col. Amyas Eden Borton DSO AFC Royal Highlanders
- Lt.-Col. Albert Fletcher CBE MC Royal Engineers
- Lt.-Col. Alfred Drummond Warrington-Morris OBE
- Lt.-Col. John Archibald Houison-Craufurd CBE Indian Army
- Maj. John Adrian Chamier DSO OBE Ind Army
- Lt.-Col. Arthur Sheridan Barratt MC Royal Artillery
- Lt.-Col. Cecil Fraser OBE MC North Staffordshire Regiment
- Maj. Robert Anstruther Bradley, North Staffordshire Regiment
- Maj. and Bt. Lt.-Col. Edwin Henry Ethelbert Collen DSO
- Lt.-Col. Samuel McDonald DSO Gordon Highlanders

Canadian Forces

- Temp Col. Bernard Maynard Humble DSO Canadian Railway Troops
- Lt.-Col. George Gow, Canadian Army Dent. Corps
- Lt.-Col. Allan Coats Rankin, Canadian Army Medical Corps
- Lt.-Col. William Thorns Morris Mackinnon, Canadian Army Medical Corps
- Lt.-Col. Frederick Charles Bell, Canadian Army Medical Corps
- Lt.-Col. Ervin Lockwood Stone, Canadian Army Medical Corps
- Lt.-Col. Edgar William Pope, Nova Scotia Regiment
- Lt.-Col. Thomas Gibson DSO Quebec Regiment
- Lt.-Col. George Hamilton Cassels, Central Ontario Regiment

Australian Forces

- Lt.-Col. Robert Edward Jackson DSO Australia Imperial Force
- Lt.-Col. John Hubback Anderson CBE Australia Army Medical Corps

New Zealand Forces

- Lt.-Col. George Cruickshanks Griffiths, Canterbury Regiment

For services rendered in connection with military operations in the Balkans —

- Col. John Kelso Tod, Indian Army
- Maj. and Bt. Col. William Montgomery Thomson CB MC Seaforth Highlanders
- Temp Col. Hildred Edward Webb Bowen DSO Royal Engineers
- Lt.-Col. and Bt. Col. Thomas Bruce DSO Royal Artillery
- Lt.-Col. and Bt. Col. Philip Lancelot Holbrooke DSO Royal Artillery
- Lt.-Col. Guy Archibald Hastings Beatty DSO Indian Army
- Maj. and Bt. Lt.-Col. Verney Asser DSO Royal Artillery
- Maj. and Bt. Lt.-Col. William James Norman Cooke-Collis DSO Royal Irish Rifles
- Lt.-Col. George Hamilton Gordon DSO Royal Field Artillery
- Maj. and Bt. Lt.-Col. Harold Charles Webster Hale Wortham DSO Royal Irish Fusiliers
- Lt.-Col. Archibald Ogilvie Lyttelton Kindersley, Highland Light Infantry, Special Reserve
- Maj. and Bt. Lt.-Col. Charles Walter Holden DSO Royal Army Medical Corps
- Maj. and Bt. Lt.-Col. Thomas Gayer Gayer-Anderson DSO Royal Artillery
- Maj. and Bt. Lt.-Col. Robert Stewart Popham DSO Nottinghamshire and Derbyshire Regiment
- Maj. and Bt. Lt.-Col. Peter George Fry DSO Wessex Field Company, Royal Engineers
- Maj. Joseph Ward DSO Royal Army Medical Corps

For services rendered in connection with military operations in France and Flanders —

- Maj.-Gen. John Joseph Gerrard CB
- Maj.-Gen. James Thomson CB Army Medical Service
- Maj.-Gen. Ewen George Sinclair-Maclagan CB DSO
- Col. and Brig. Gen. Herbert Conyers Surtees CB DSO MVO
- Col. Henry O'Donnell, late West Yorkshire Regiment
- Maj. and Bt. Col. Arthur Crawford Daly CB West Yorkshire Regiment
- Maj. and Bt. Col. James Ronald Edmondston Charles CB DSO Royal Engineers
- Col. Stafford Charles Babington DSO Royal Engineers
- Lt.-Col. and Bt. Col. Arbuthnott James Hughes, ret.
- Lt.-Col. and Bt. Col. George Sidney Clive CB DSO Grenadier Guards
- Maj. and Bt. Col. Eric Stanley Girdwood CB Scottish Rifles
- Lt.-Col. and Bt. Col. Herbert Spencer Seligman DSO Royal Artillery
- Maj. and Bt. Col. Charles Bonham-Carter DSO Royal West Kent Regiment
- Lt.-Col. and Bt. Col. Charles Walker Scott DSO Royal Artillery
- Lt.-Col. and Bt. Col. Frederick William Henry Walshe DSO Royal Artillery
- Maj. and Bt. Col. Cuthbert Graham Fuller DSO Royal Engineers
- Maj. and Bt. Col. Roland Henry Mangles DSO Royal West Surrey Regiment
- Lt.-Col. and Bt. Col. John Eric Christian Livingstone-Learmonth DSO Royal Artillery
- Maj. and Bt. Col. Alfred Edgar Glasgow DSO Royal Sussex Regiment
- Capt. and Bt. Col. Robert O'Hara Livesay DSO Royal West Surrey Regiment
- Maj. and Bt. Col. Ernest Vere Turner DSO Royal Engineers
- Capt. and Bt. Col. Hon Anthony Morton Henley DSO 5th Lancers
- Lt.-Col. Sir Edward Henry St. Lawrence Clarke Bt DSO Ret., West Yorkshire Regiment
- Lt.-Col. William Thorburn CB FRCS Royal Army Medical Corps
- Lt.-Col. Seymour Gilbert Barling FRCS Royal Army Medical Corps
- Lt.-Col. William Thomas Brownlow, Marquess of Exeter, Royal Field Artillery
- Lt.-Col. Hugh Edwardes, Lord Kensington DSO Welsh Horse Yeomanry, attd. Royal Welsh Fusiliers
- Lt.-Col. Edward William Home CBE Seaforth Highlanders and Labour Corps
- Lt.-Col. Cecil John Herbert Spence-Jones DSO Pembroke Yeomanry, attd. Welsh Regiment
- Lt.-Col. Gerald Trevor Bruce DSO Glamorgan Yeomanry, attd. Lincolnshire Regiment
- Temp Lt.-Col. Firederick Alfred Dixon DSO Royal Artillery
- Lt.-Col. Arthur Robert Liddell DSO Royal Army Service Corps
- Lt.-Col. Robert Richmond Raymeir DSO South Wales Borderers
- Temp Lt.-Col. Charles Carlyle MacDowell DSO Royal Artillery
- Lt.-Col. Duncan Gus Baillie DSO Lovat's Scouts and Cameron Highlanders
- Lt.-Col. Edwin Charles Montgomery Smith DSO Royal Army Medical Corps
- Lt.-Col. Reginald Edgar Sugden DSO West Riding Regiment
- Lt.-Col. Abraham England DSO Royal Army Service Corps
- Temp Lt.-Col. Robert Kyle DSO Highland Light Infantry
- Temp Lt.-Col. William Richard Goodwin DSO Royal Irish Rifles
- Temp Lt.-Col. Bertram James Walker DSO Royal Sussex Regiment
- Temp Lt.-Col. James George Kirkwood DSO King's Royal Rifle Corps
- Temp Lt.-Col. Albert Edward Scothera DSO Nottinghamshire and Derbyshire Regiment
- Lt.-Col. Jacob Waley Cohen DSO London Regiment
- Lt.-Col. Walter Francis Lucy DSO Royal Field Artillery
- Temp Lt.-Col. Claude Gordon Douglas MC
- Temp Lt.-Col. Gerald Louis Johnson Tuck DSO Suffolk Regiment
- Lt.-Col. Francis Garven Dillon Johnston DSO Royal Artillery
- Temp Lt.-Col. John Hugh Chevalier Peirs DSO Royal West Surrey Regiment
- Temp Lt.-Col. George Rollo DSO New Armies
- Lt.-Col. Walter Howel-Jones DSO Royal Artillery
- Lt.-Col. Edward Walter Comyn DSO Royal Artillery
- Lt.-Col. Edward Ivan de Sausmarez Thorpe DSO Bedfordshire Regiment
- Lt.-Col. Bertie Coore Dent DSO Leicestershire Regiment
- Maj. and Bt. Lt.-Col. William-Frederick Sweny DSO Royal Fusiliers
- Maj. and Bt. Lt.-Col. John Harington DSO Rifle Brigade
- Lt.-Col. Richard Walter St. Lawrence Gethin DSO Royal Artillery
- Lt.-Col. Tom Ogle Seagram DSO Royal Artillery
- Lt.-Col. Arthur Hugh Thorp DSO Royal Artillery
- Lt.-Col. James Donnelly Sherer DSO Royal Artillery
- Bt. Col. Alfred Burt DSO 3rd Dragoon Guards
- Lt.-Col. Edward Vaughan DSO Manchester Regiment
- Lt.-Col. Harry Ward DSO Royal Artillery
- Maj. and Bt. Lt.-Col. Carlos Joseph Hickie, Royal Fusiliers
- Maj. and Bt. Lt.-Col. Basil Wilfred Bowdler Bowdler DSO Royal Engineers
- Maj. and, Bt. Lt.-Col. Frank Augustin Kinder White DSO Royal Engineers
- Maj. and Bt. Lt.-Col. Alan Gordon Haig DSO Royal Artillery
- Maj. and Bt. Lt.-Col. Eric FitzGerald Dillon DSO Royal Munster Fusiliers
- Maj. and Bt. Lt.-Col. George Archibald Stevens DSO Royal Fusiliers
- Maj. and Bt. Lt.-Col. Reginald Graham Clarke DSO Royal West Surrey Regiment and Machine Gun Corps
- Maj. and Bt. Lt.-Col. Alan John Hunter DSO MC King's Royal Rifle Corps
- Lt.-Col. William Edwin Rumbold, Royal Artillery
- Lt.-Col. Henry Rowan-Robinson DSO Royal Artillery
- Lt.-Col. Edward Bunbury North DSO Royal Fusiliers
- Maj. and Bt. Lt.-Col. Robert Napier Bray DSO West Riding Regiment
- Maj. and Bt. Lt.-Col. Herbert de Lisle Pollard-Lowsley CIE DSO Royal Engineers
- Maj. and Bt. Lt.-Col. John Hugh Mackenzie DSO Royal Scots
- Maj. and Bt. Lt.-Col. George Newell Thomas Smyth-Osbourne DSO Devonshire Regiment
- Maj. and Bt. Lt.-Col. William Humphrey May Freestun DSO Somerset Light Infantry
- Maj. and Bt. Lt.-Col. William Ernest Scaife DSO Devonshire Regiment
- Lt.-Col. Frederick Rainsford Hannay DSO Royal Artillery
- Lt.-Col. Trevor Irvine Nevitt Mears DSO Royal Army Service Corps
- Lt.-Col. Francis Roger Sedgwick DSO Royal Artillery
- Maj. and Bt. Lt.-Col. Llewellyn Murray Jones DSO Liverpool Regiment
- Lt.-Col. Charles Allen Elliott DSO Royal Engineers
- Maj. and Bt. Lt.-Col. Austin Hubert Wightwick Haywood DSO Royal Artillery
- Lt.-Col. John Grahame Buchanan Allardyce DSO Royal Artillery
- Maj. and Bt. Lt.-Col. Oscar Gilbert Brandon DSO Royal Engineers
- Maj. and Bt. Lt.-Col. Charles Reginald Johnson DSO Royal Engineers
- Maj. and Bt. Lt.-Col. William Athol Murray DSO Royal Artillery
- Maj. and Bt. Lt.-Col. Vernon Monro Colquhoun Napier DSO Royal Artillery
- Maj. and Bt. Lt.-Col. James Aloysius Francis Cuffe DSO Royal Munster Fusiliers
- Maj. and Bt. Lt.-Col. George Camborne Beauclerk Paynter DSO Scots Guards
- Maj. and Bt. Lt.-Col. John Laurence Buxton DSO Rifle Brigade
- Maj. and Bt. Lt.-Col. Frederick Gordon Springy DSO Lincolnshire Regiment
- Maj. and Bt. Lt., Col. Sanford John Palairet Scobell DSO Norfolk Regiment
- Maj. and Bt. Lt.-Col. Compton Cardew Norman DSO Royal Welsh Fusiliers
- Maj. and Bt. Lt.-Col. Nigel Keppel Charteris DSO Royal Scots, and M.G.G
- Maj. and Bt. Lt.-Col. William Gwyther Charles DSO Essex Regiment
- Maj. and Bt. Lt.-Col. William Norman Herbert DSO Northumberland Fusiliers
- Maj. and Bt. Lt.-Col. Clive Osrio Vere Gray DSO Seaforth Highlanders
- Maj. and Bt. Lt.-Col. Edward Henry Lionel Beddington DSO MC 16th Lancers
- Capt. and Bt. Lt.-Col. Thomas George Cope DSO Royal Fusiliers
- Capt. and Bt. Lt.-Col. Bernard Cyril Freyburg VC DSO Grenadier Guards, late Royal West Surrey Regiment
- Lt.-Col. Hubert de Lansey Walters DSO Royal Artillery
- Maj. and Bt. Lt.-Col. Christopher Vaughan Edwards DSO Yorkshire Regiment
- Maj. and Bt. Lt.-Col. Alexander Guthrie Thompson, 58th Rifles, Indian Army
- Maj. and Bt. Lt.-Col. Reginald Heaton Locke Cutbill DSO Royal Army Service Corps
- Maj. and Bt. Lt.-Col. Cyril Samuel Sackville Curteis DSO Royal Artillery
- Maj. and Bt. Lt.-Col. Charles Edwin Vickery DSO Royal Artillery
- Maj. and Bt. Lt.-Col. Francis George Alston DSO Scots Guards
- Maj. and Bt. Lt.-Col. Henry Coventry Maitland Makgill Crichton DSO Royal Scots Fusiliers
- Maj. and Bt. Lt.-Col. Stephen Seymour Butler DSO South Staffordshire Regiment
- Maj. and Bt. Lt.-Col. Edward Robert Clayton DSO Oxfordshire and Buckinghamshire Light Infantry
- Maj. and Bt. Lt.-Col. Frederick Courtney Tanner DSO Royal Scots
- Maj. and Bt. Lt.-Col. George Mackintosh Lindsay DSO Rifle Brigade
- Maj. and Bt. Lt.-Col. Robert Francis Guy DSO Wiltshire Regiment
- Maj. and Bt. Lt.-Col. Joseph Ernest Munby DSO Yorkshire Light Infantry
- Maj. and Bt. Lt.-Col. Cuthbert Garrard Browne DSO Royal Army Medical Corps
- Maj. and Bt. Lt.-Col. Gordon Harry Gill DSO Royal Army Service Corps
- Maj.and Bt. Lt.-Col. Cecil Barrington Norton DSO Ret. Pay
- Capt. and Bt. Lt.-Col. Hon Roger Brand DSO Rifle Brigade
- Maj. and Bt. Lt.-Col. George Ronald Hamilton Cheape DSO MC 1st Dragoon Guards
- Lt.-Col. Charles Frank Rundall DSO Royal Engineers
- Maj. and Bt. Lt.-Col. Henry Donald Buchanan-Dunlop DSO Royal West Kent Regiment, and Machine Gun Corps
- Maj. Harold Futvoye Lea DSO late Yorkshire Regiment
- Maj. Henry Schofield Rogers DSO late Royal Engineers
- Maj. George Harold-Abseiling DSO 2nd Dragoon Guards
- Maj. Sir Dudley Baines Forwood Bt
- Maj. Reginald Wingfield Castle DSO Royal Artillery
- Maj. Abel Mellor DSO Royal Artillery
- Maj. Robert Carlisle Williams DSO Royal Artillery
- Maj. Charles Wesley Weldon McLean DSO Royal Artillery
- Maj. Harold James Norman Davis DSO Connaught Rangers, and Machine Gun Corps
- Maj. William John Shannon DSO 16th Lancers, attd. Tank Corps
- Maj. Lewis Pugh Evans VC DSO Royal Highlanders
- Maj. Edward Martyn Woulfe Flanagan DSO East Surrey Regiment, attd. Oxfordshire and Buckinghamshire Light Infantry
- Maj. Robert Riversdale Smyth DSO Leinster Regiment
- Maj. Augustus Francis Andrew Nicol Thome DSO Grenadier Guards
- Maj. Edward Michael Conolly, ret. pay, late Royal Artillery
- Capt. and Bt. Maj. Edward Cotton Jury MC 18th Hussars
- Maj. Alexander Campbell DSO Royal Engineers
- Maj. Desmond Francis Anderson DSO East Yorkshire Regiment
- Temp Maj. Henry William Laws DSO Royal Engineers
- Maj. Joseph Harold Stops Westley DSO Yorkshire Regiment
- Temp Maj. Ewart James Collett DSO Middlesex Regiment, attd. London Regiment
- Maj. Augustus Cecil Hale Duke DSO
- Temp Maj. John Patrick Hunt DSO DCM
- Temp Lt.-Col. Edward William Macleay Grigg DSO MC Grenadier Guards

Canadian Forces

- Brig. Gen. Robert Walter Paterson DSO Fort Garry Horse
- Brig. Gen. John Arthur Clark DSO British Columbia Regiment
- Brig. Gen. Robert Percy Clark DSO MC Quebec Regiment
- Col. Halfdan Fenton Harboe Hertzberg DSO MC Canadian Engineers
- Lt.-Col. Harold Halford Matthews DSO Manitoba Regiment
- Lt.-Col. James Kirkcaldy DSO Manitoba Regiment
- Lt.-Col. Samuel Boyd Anderson DSO Canadian Field Artillery
- Lt.-Col. Louis Elgin Jones DSO Western Ontario Regiment
- Lt.-Col. Alfred Blake Carey DSO Central Ontario Regiment
- Lt.-Col. Fred Lister DSO MC Central Ontario Regiment
- Lt.-Col. Lorne Talbot McLaughlin DSO Eastern Ontario Regiment
- Lt.-Col. Percival John Montague DSO MC Manitoba Regiment
- Lt.-Col. James Layton Ralston DSO Nova Scotia Regiment
- Lt.-Col. Joseph Bartlett Rogers DSO MC 1st Central Ontario Regiment
- Lt.-Col. Stancliffe Wallace Watson DSO Canadian Machine Gun Corps
- Lt.-Col. Edward Robert Wayland, New Brunswick Regiment
- Brig. Gen. Andrew George Latta McNaughton DSO Canadian Field Artillery

Australian Force

- Lt.-Col. Cecil Arthur Callaghan DSO Australian Field Artillery
- Col. Owen Forbes Phillips DSO
- Col. Sydney Charles Edgar Herring DSO
- Lt.-Col. Thomas Peel Dunhill, Australian Army Medical Corps
- Lt.-Col. Frederick Royden Chalmers DSO Australian Imperial Force
- Lt.-Col. John Montague Christian Corlette DSO Australia Engineers
- Lt.-Col. Patrick Currie DSO Australian Imperial Force
- Lt.-Col. Frederick William Dempster Forbes DSO Australian Imperial Force
- Lt.-Col. William Alexander Henderson DSO Australia Engineers
- Lt.-Col. Alexander Robert Heron DSO Australian Imperial Force
- Lt.-Col. John Edward Cecil Lord DSO Australian Imperial Force
- Lt.-Col. Henry Dundas Keith Macartney DSO Australian Field Artillery
- Lt.-Col. Henry William Murray VC DSO DCM Australia Machine Gun Corps
- Lt.-Col. Harold William Riggall DSO Australian Imperial Force
- Lt.-Col. Alfred George Salisbury DSO Australian Imperial Force
- Lt.-Col. Harold Fletcher White DSO Australian Imperial Force
- Lt.-Col. Thomas Rhys Williams DSO Aust. Engineers
- Lt.-Col. Aubrey Roy Liddon Wiltshire DSO MC Australian Imperial Force
- Lt.-Col. Henry Douglas Wynter DSO

New Zealand Forces

- Lt.-Col. Stephen Shepherd Allen DSO Auckland Regiment
- Lt.-Col. Henry Esau Avery DSO NZ Staff Corps
- Lt.-Col. Hugh Stewart DSO MC Canterbury Regiment
- Lt.-Col. Alexander Edward Stewart DSO NZ Rifle Brigade

South African Forces

- Temp Maj. Newdigate Halford Marriott Burne DSO attd. Shropshire Light Infantry
- Temp Lt.-Col. George Ritchie Thomson SA Medical Corps
- Temp Maj. Thomas Lyttleton de Havilland DSO Union Defence Force of South Africa, comdg. Royal Guernsey Light Infantry

For valuable services rendered in connection with military operations in Italy —

- Lt.-Col. and Bt. Col. John Byron CB Royal Artillery
- Maj. and Bt. Col. Henry Lethbridge Alexander CB DSO Dorsetshire Regiment
- Temp Lt.-Col. Douglas Quirk DSO Yorkshire Light Infantry
- Maj. and Bt. Lt.-Col. John Earner Turner DSO Sea. Rifles
- Maj. and Bt. Lt.-Col. Cuthbert Frederick Graham Page DSO Royal Garrison Artillery
- Maj. and Bt. Lt.-Col. Eric Felton Falkner DSO Royal Army Service Corps
- Maj. and Bt. Lt.-Col. John Holgate Bateson DSO Royal Garrison Artillery
- Maj. and Bt. Lt.-Col. Henry Cecil Lloyd Howard DSO 16th Lancers
- Maj. and Bt. Lt.-Col. Harold Richard Sandilands DSO Northumberland Fusiliers

For services rendered in connection with military operations in Mesopotamia —

- Col. Hugh Clement Sutton CB late Coldstream Guards
- Col. William Thomas Mould, late Royal Army Medical Corps
- Lt.-Col. Murray Ray de Bruyne James, Royal Army Service Corps
- Lt.-Col. Charles Mackenzie DSO 13th Lancers, Indian Army
- Lt.-Col. Frank Evelyn Coningham DSO 1/10th Gurkha Rifles, Indian Army
- Maj. and Bt. Lt.-Col. Thomas Reginald Fraser Bate, Royal Artillery
- Lt.-Col. Edward Herbert Sweet DSO 2nd Gurkha Rifles, Indian Army
- Maj. and Bt. Lt.-Col. Arthur William Hamilton May Moens DSO 52nd Sikhs, Indian Army

For services rendered in connection with military operations in North Russia (Archangel Command) —

- Temp Lt.-Col. James Dayrolles Crosbie DSO

Canadian Forces

- Lt.-Col. Charles Henry Ludovic Sharman OBE Canadian Field Artillery

For services rendered in connection with military operations in North Russia (Murmansk Command) —

- Maj. Edward Lawton Moss MC Royal Army Medical Corps

=== The Most Eminent Order of the Indian Empire ===
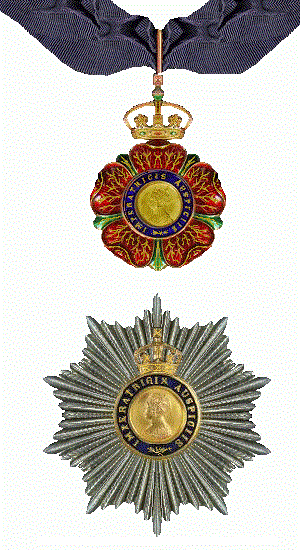
Riband, badge and star of the Knight Grand Commander of the Order of the Indian Empire

==== Knight Commander (KCIE) ====
- Charles Ernest Low CIE Indian Civil Service, Member of the Indian Industrial Commission
- Maharaj Kunwar Bhopal Singh, of Udaipur, Rajputana
- Nawab Khan Bahadur Mir Shams Shah CIE ISO Wazir-i-Azam, Kalat State, Baluchistan

For valuable services rendered in connection with the military operations in France —

- Lt.-Gen. Sir Edward Locke Elliot KCB DSO

==== Companion (CIE) ====
- Purushottamdas Thakurdas MBE Additional Member of the Council of His Excellency the Governor, Bombay
- Khan Bahadur Khwaja Yusaf Shah, Member of the Legislative Council of the Punjab
- Norman Edward Marjoribanks, Indian Civil Service, Additional Member of the Council of His Excellency the Governor, and Commissioner of Land Revenue and Forests, Madras
- Atul Chandra Chatarji, Indian Civil Service, Revenue Secretary to the Government of the United Provinces
- Robert Duncan Bell, Indian Civil Service, Secretary, Indian Industrial Commission and Controller of Industrial Intelligence
- Rai Bahadur Rala Ram ISO Chief Engineer, Eastern Bengal Railway, Bengal
- Lt.-Col. Henry Cecil Beadon, Indian Army, Deputy Commissioner, Delhi
- Herbert Charles Barnes, Indian Civil Service, Deputy Commissioner, Naga Hills, Assam
- Harold Clayton, Indian Civil Service, Registrar of Co-operative Credit Societies, Maymyo, Burma
- Charles Bevan Petman, Government Advocate, Punjab
- Frank Arthur Money Hampe Vincent MVO Commissioner of Police, Bombay
- Reginald Clarke, Commissioner of Police, Calcutta, Bengal
- Mark James Cogswell, Controller of Printing, Stationery and Stamps
- Lt.-Col. William Dunbar Sutherland, Indian Medical Service, Imperial Serologist, Calcutta, and Chemical Examiner to the Government of Bengal
- Lt.-Col. John Joseph Bourke, Indian Medical Service, Assay Master and Officiating Mint Master, Calcutta
- Lt.-Col. John Stephenson, Indian Medical Service, Principal and Professor of Biology, Government College, Lahore, Punjab
- Henry Haselfoot Haines, Conservator of Forests, Bihar and Orissa
- Robert Selby Hole, Imperial Forest Botanist, Denra Dun, United Provinces
- Cursetji Nowroji Wadia, Bombay
- Eric Teichman, British Consular Service, China
- David Houston, Director of Agriculture, Central Provinces
- Charles Alfred Bell CMG Indian Civil Service (retired), late Political Officer in Sikkim
- Raja Bahadur Rao Jogendra Narayan Ray, of Lalgola, Bengal
- Norendra Nath Sen, Dewan, Cooch Behar State, and Member, State Council, Bengal
- William John Bradshaw

For meritorious services connected with the War —

- Lt.-Col. Richard Arthur Needham DSO Indian Medical Service, Deputy Director-Gen., Indian Medical Service
- Josiah Crosby OBE His Britannic Majesty's Consul, Saigon
- Charles Alexander Innes, Indian Civil Service, Controller of Munitions, Madras
- Philip Peveril John Wodehouse, Deputy Superintendent of Police, Hong Kong
- Capt. Edward Ivo Medhurst Barrett, Assistant Superintendent of Police, Shanghai
- Samuel Findlater Stewart, Deputy Secretary, Military Department, India Office

For services in connection with military operations in East Africa—

- Maj. Patrick Laurence O'Neill, Indian Medical Service
- Capt. Gordon Grey Jolly Indian Medical Service
- Maj. Arthur Pitcher Manning OBE MC Indian Telegraph Department

For services in connection with the military operations in Mesopotamia —

- Lt. Henry Harry Francis Macdonald Tyler, Indian Army Reserve of Officers
- Col. Henry William Richard Senior DSO Indian Army
- Lt.-Col. Ralph Henry Maddox, Indian Medical Service
- Lt.-Col. Herbert Walter Bowen DSO Indian Ordnance Department
- Lieu tenant-Col. James William Milne, 82nd Punjabis, Indian Army
- Lt.-Col. James Blair Keogh DSO 32nd Lancers
- Bt. Lt.-Col. Edward Albert Porch MC Supply and Transport Corps
- Maj. Arthur Brownfield Fry DSO Indian Medical Service
- Maj. Adrian Victor Webley Hope, 32nd Pioneers
- Maj. Leonard Erskine Gilbert, Indian Medical Service
- Maj. William, David Acheson Keys Indian Medical Service
- Maj. William Maurice Anderson Indian Medical Service
- Maj. Howard Murray, Military Accounts. Department
- Capt. and Bt. Maj. Charles de Lona Christopher, Supply and TransportCorps
- Capt. and Bt. Maj. Frederic Maxwell Carpendale, 42nd Deoli Regiment
- Maj. Arthur Henry Chenevix Trench, Royal Engineers
- Temporary Maj. Leonard Field Nalder, Special List, attached Political Department
- Capt. Charles Geoffrey Lloyd, Supply and Transport Corps
- Temporary Capt. Robert Marrs, Special List, attached Political Department
- Lt. Geoffrey Evans, Indian Army Reserve of Officers
- 2nd Lt. Samuel Henry Slater, Indian Army Reserve of Officers
- Agha Mirza Muhammad, Political Department
- Edgar Bonham-Carter CMG Sudan Legal Department. (Retired.)
- Maj. and Bt. Lt.-Col. John Hyndman Howell-Jones DSO Royal Army Ordnance Corps
- Lt.-Col. Walter Edward Wilson-Johnston DSO 36th Sikhs, Indian Army
- Maj. William Southall Reid May, Sudan Civil Service
- Temporary Capt. W. R. Dockrill, Royal Engineers
- Temporary Lt. George Mackenzie O'Rorke MBE Royal Engineers

=== The Royal Victorian Order ===
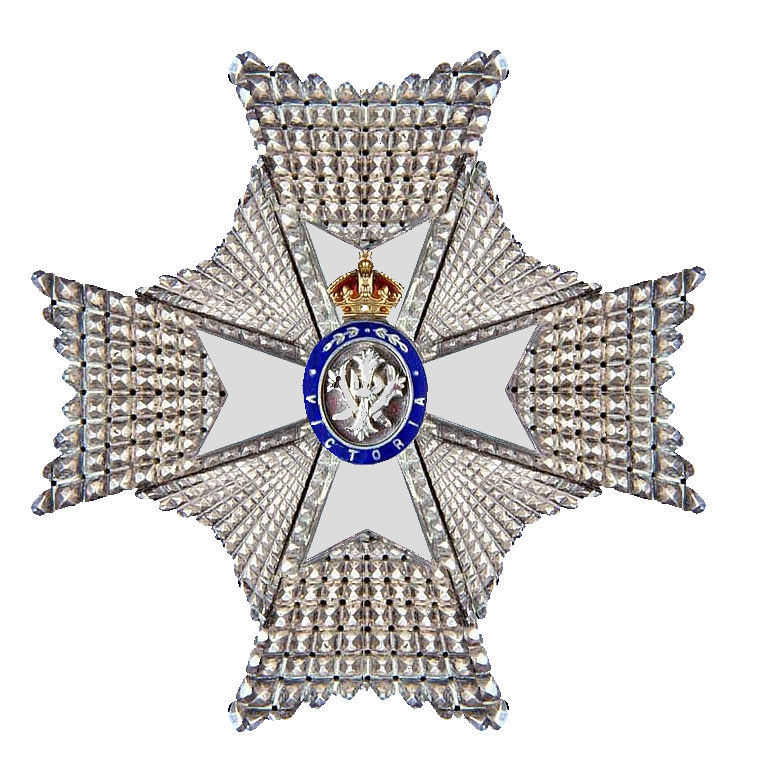
Insignia of a Knight / Dames Commander of the Royal Victorian Order

==== Knight Grand Cross of the Royal Victorian Order (GCVO) ====
- Lt.-Col. the Rt. Hon The Lord Edmund Bernard Talbot DSO MVO MP

==== Knight Commander of the Royal Victorian Order (KCVO) ====
- Lt.-Gen. Sir Francis John Davies KCB KCMG
- Rear-Admiral Sir Douglas Romilly Lothian Nicholson KCMG (Dated 24 April 1919.)
- Sir William Henry Weldon CVO Clarenceux King of Arms
- Capt. Bryan Godfrey Godfrey-Faussett CMG CVO RN
- Frederick Morris Fry
- George John Marjoribanks
- Joseph Oliver Skevington FRCS

==== Commander of the Royal Victorian Order (CVO) ====
- Sir Alexander Cruikshank Houston KBE
- John Mitchell Bruce
- Col. William Baume Capper

==== Member of the Royal Victorian Order, 4th class (MVO) ====
- The Hon Lionel Michael St. Aubyn
- Maj. Sydney Arthur Hunn OBE MC (Dated 15 May 1919.)
- Maj. Henry Fox Atkinson-Clark OBE
- Walter George Covington
- Evelyn Campbell Shaw
- Maj. Harold James Clifford Stanton

==== Member of the Royal Victorian Order, 5th class (MVO) ====
- George Francis Dixon CBE
- George Frederick Cotton MBE

=== The Most Excellent Order of the British Empire ===
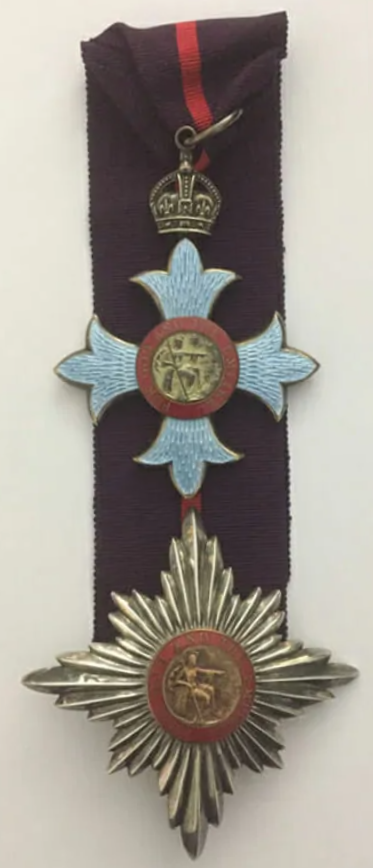
Knight Commander of the Order of the British Empire, insignia 1917–35

==== Dame Commander of the Order of the British Empire (DBE) ====
===== Military Division =====
In recognition of distinguished services rendered during the War —

- Helen Charlotte Isabella Gwynne-Vaughan CBE Women's Royal Air Force
- Sarah Elizabeth Oram RRC Principal Matron, Queen Alexandra's Imperial Military Nursing Service

===== Civil Division =====
- The Honourable Mary, Lady Monro
- Una, Lady O'Dwyer CBE, Punjab

Commonwealth of Australia

- Alice, Lady Northcote
- Florence Rose, Countess of Darnley

Crown Colonies, Protectorates, Etc.

- Mabel Danvers Ryder, Countess of Harrowby for services in connection with the entertainment of Officers of the Overseas Forces

==== Knight Commander of the Order of the British Empire (KBE) ====
===== Military Division =====
For services rendered in connection with military operations in the Balkans —

- Col. Arthur Long CB CMG DSO Royal Army Service Corps
- Col. Hugh Davie White-Thomson CB CMG DSO Royal Artillery

For valuable services rendered in connection with military operations in Egypt —

- Maj.-Gen. Sir Arthur Wigram Money KCB CSI Royal Artillery
- Col. Sir Robert Whyte Melville Jackson KCMG CB Royal Army Ordnance Corps
- Col. Harry Davis Watson CB CMG CIE MVO Indian Army
- Lt.-Col. and Bt. Col. Michael Graham Egerton Bowman-Manifold CB CMG DSO Royal Engineers
- Maj. and Bt. Col. Gilbert Falkingham Clayton CB CMG Royal Artillery

For valuable services rendered in connection with military operations in France and Flanders —

- Col. Valentine Murray CB CMG Royal Engineers
- Maj. Hamilton Ashley Ballance CB FRCS Royal Army Medical Corps
- Col. Robert Hammill Firth CB FRCS Army Medical Service

For services rendered in connection with military operations in Italy —

- Temp Col. Charles Gordon-Watson CMG FRCS Army Medical Service

In recognition of services of in connection with the War —

Royal Navy

- Rear-Admiral Charles Lionel Vaughan-Lee CB
- Surgeon Rear-Admiral William Wenmoth Pryn CB
- Surgeon Rear-Admiral Patrick Brodie Handyside CB
- Capt. Herbert Edward Purey-Cust CB CBE RNR (Admiral, retired)
- Surgeon Capt. Daniel Joseph Patrick McNabb CB
- Surgeon Capt. Arthur Stanley Nance CB
- Paymaster Capt. Francis Cooke Alton CB CMG

Army

- Lt.-Col. Arthur William Forbes CB Indian Army
- Col. Francis James Anderson CB late Royal Engineers
- Col. Edward Hamilton Seymour CB CMG Royal Army Ordnance Corps
- Col. Arthur Robert Dick CB CVO Indian Army
- Col. Dudley Howard Ridout CB CMG Royal Engineers
- Maj.-Gen. Hon Charles John Sackville-West CMG late King's Royal Rifle Corps
- Lt.-Col. and Bt. Col. Frederick Cuthbert Poole CB CMG DSO Royal Artillery
- Col. George Bradshaw Stanistreet CB CMG Army Medical Service
- Lt.-Col. Henry Davy CB Royal Army Medical Corps
- Lt.-Col. and Bt. Col. German Sims Woodhead OBE Royal Army Medical Corps
- Lt.-Col. Sir Shirley Forster Murphy Kt FRCS Royal Army Medical Corps
- Lt.-Col. D'Arcy Power FRCS Royal Army Medical Corps
- Temp Lt.-Col. James Leigh-Wood CB CMG
- Maj. Henry Mcilree Williamson Gray CB CMG FRCS Royal Army Medical Corps
- Maj. Sir Arthur William Mayo-Robson Kt CB CVO FRCS Royal Army Medical Corps
- Maj. Charters James Symonds CB FRCS Royal Army Medical Corps
- Maj. and Bt. Lt.-Col. Frederick Walker Mott FRCP FRS Royal Army Medical Corps
- Maj. Sir Robert Jones Kt CB FRCS Royal Army Medical Corps
- Capt. Archibald Douglas Reid CMG Royal Army Medical Corps
- Lt.-Gen. Sir Herbert Eversley Belfield KCB KCMG DSO West Riding Regiment
- Col. and Hon Maj.-Gen. Francis George Bond CB CMG Staff
- Col. Robert Calverley Alington Bewicke-Copley CB King's Royal Rifle Corps
- Col. Robert Megaw Ireland CB CMG Army Pay Department
- Col. George William Hacket Pain CB
- Lt.-Col. Sir Edward Raban KCB Royal Engineers
- Lt.-Col. and Bt. Col. Arthur Granville Balfour CB Highland Light Infantry
- Lt.-Col. and Bt. Col. Hill Godfrey Morgan CB CMG DSO Royal Army Service Corps
- Maj. and Bt. Lt.-Col. Lord Arthur Howe Browne, Royal Munster Fusiliers
- Maj. and Bt. Lt.-Col. Vernon George Waldegrave Kell CB South Staffordshire Regiment
- Lt.-Col. Robert William Edis CB London Regiment
- Col. Robert Campbell MacKenzie CB
- Col. Herbrand Arthur, The Duke of Bedford KG ADC late Bedfordshire Regiment

Australian Imperial Forces

- Col. Charles Snodgrass Ryan CB Royal Army Medical Corps
- Maj.-Gen. The Hon Sir James Whiteside McCay KCMG CB Staff

===== Civil Division =====
British India

- Nawab Sir Bahrain Khan KCIE Mazari of the Dera Ghazi Khan District, Member of the Legislative Council of the Punjab.
- Raja Daljit Singh CSI Chief Minister Jammu and Kashmir State
- Lt.-Col. Sardar Appaji Rao Sitole CIE
- Amir-ul-Umra, Member of the Majlis-i-Khas, Gwalior State, Central India

Union of South Africa

- William Dingwall Mitchell Cotts, for services in connection with recruiting
- Col. Henry Walter Hamilton Fowle CMG Commissioner of Enemy subjects and Custodian of Enemy property
- Harry Hands, ex-Mayor of Cape Town, for services in connection with recruiting and other war work
- Senator Col. the Hon. Walter Ernest Mortimer Stanford CB CMG OBE Director of war recruiting and Commissioner for returned soldiers

Newfoundland

- The Honourable John Chalker Crosbie, Minister of Shipping, Chairman of the Tonnage Committee

Crown Colonies, Protectorates, Etc.

- Charles Calvert Bowring CMG Chief Secretary to the Government, East Africa Protectorate, for services as President of the War Council and Acting Governor of the Protectorate
- Francis Charles Bernard Dudley Fuller CMG Chief Commissioner, Ashanti
- Lt.-Col. Raleigh Grey CMG CVO Member of the Legislative Council of Southern Rhodesia
- Sir Henry Francis Wilson KCMG Secretary, Royal Colonial Institute, Member of the Empire Land Settlement Committee and War Services Committee
- William Douglas Young CMG Governor and Commander-in-Chief of the Falkland Islands

Honorary Knight Commander

- His Highness Seyyid Khalifa bin Harub, Sultan of Zanzibar KCMG

==== Commander of the Order of the British Empire (CBE) ====
===== Military Division =====
For services rendered in connection with military operations in the Balkans —

- Maj. and Bt. Lt.-Col. George William Dowell CMG Rem. Service
- Temp Col. Leonard Stanley Dudgeon CMG Army Medical Service
- Temp Lt.-Col. Arthur Wellesley Falconer DSO Royal Army Medical Corps
- Capt. Eric Gerald Gauntlett DSO FRCS Royal Army Medical Corps
- Capt. and Bt. Maj. Harry Upington Hooper, Royal Engineers
- Rev. William Stevenson Jaffray CMG Royal Army Chaplains' Department
- Temp Maj. Reginald Keble Morcom MBE Royal Engineers
- Col. Herbert Chidgey Brine Payne CMG Army Pay Department
- Capt. and Bt. Maj. Godfrey Dean Rhodes DSO Royal Engineers
- Maj. and Bt. Lt.-Col. Digby Inglis Shuttleworth, Indian Army
- Col. William Hugh Usher Smith CB DSO Royal Army Ordnance Corps
- Capt. and Bt. Maj. George Brian Ogilvie Taylor, Royal Engineers
- Lt.-Col. Charles Walter Villiers DSO OBE Coldstream Guards
- Temp Lt.-Col. Charles Morley Wenyon CMG Royal Army Medical Corps

For valuable services rendered in connection with military operations in East Africa—

- Quartermaster and Capt. Ernest Dwyer MC Royal Army Service Corps
- Maj. and Bt. Lt.-Col. Robert Blackall Graham, 33rd Punjabis, Indian Army

For valuable service rendered in connection with military operations in France —

- Temp Lt.-Col. Charles Murray Abercrombie CMG labour Corps
- Temp Col. John Heathcote Addie
- Col. John Donald Alexander DSO late Royal Army Medical Corps
- Temp Lt.-Col. James Dalgleish Anderson DSO Royal Army Service Corps
- Col. Reginald le Normand Brabazon, Lord Ardee CB
- Lt.-Col. Herbert Tollemache Arnold DSO Army Pay Department
- Maj. and Bt. Lt.-Col. Jasper Baker, Royal Army Ordnance Corps
- Temp Lt.-Col. Alfred George Barnett MBE
- Col. Frank Warburton Begbie, late Royal Army Medical Corps
- Col. Wilfred William Ogilvy Beveridge CB DSO late Royal Army Medical Corps
- Temp Lt.-Col. Edward Augustane Blount OBE
- Col. Stewart Bogle-Smith CB
- Lt.-Col. Arthur Winniett Nunn Bowen DSO Royal Army Medical Corps
- Maj. Sir John Rose Bradford KCMG CB Royal Army Medical Corps
- Temp Lt.-Col. Francis Powell Braithwaite DSO MC Royal Engineers
- Temp Maj. William Philip Sutcliffe Branson FRCP Royal Army Medical Corps
- Lt.-Col. William Bromley-Davenport CMG DSO Special Reserve
- Col. Sherwood Dighton Browne CB late Royal Artillery
- Lt.-Col. Bernard Bruce Burke DSO Royal Army Medical Corps
- Capt. Harold Burrows OBE Royal Army Medical Corps
- Lt.-Col. and Bt. Col. James Paul Bush CMG Royal Army Medical Corps
- Lt.-Col. Eustace Maude Callender, Royal Army Medical Corps
- Lt.-Col. John Hay Campbell DSO Royal Army Medical Corps
- Rev. John Garden MC Royal Army Chaplains' Department
- Lt.-Col. George Ross Marryab Church CMG Royal Garrison Artillery
- Lt.-Col. John Clay MRCS Royal Army Medical Corps
- Temp Maj. Robert Higham Cooper, Royal Army Medical Corps
- Temp Lt.-Col. Edward Kyme Cordeaux, Labour Corps
- Temp Lt.-Col. Gerald Oldroyd Cornock-Taylor (dated 25 February 1919)
- Temp Lt.-Col. John Duncan Campbell Couper, Royal Engineers
- Maj. Henry Edward Colvin Cowie DSO Royal Engineers
- Lt.-Col. Robert Langely Cranford FRCVS Royal Army Veterinary Corps
- Chief Controller Lila Davy OBE Queen Mary's Army Auxiliary Corps
- Lt.-Col. and Bt. Col. William L'Estrange Eames CB Royal Army Medical Corps
- Temp Col. Thomas Renton Elliott DSO Army Medical Service
- Lt.-Col. Otto William Alexander Eisner DSO Royal Army Medical Corps
- Col. Henry Adeane Erskine CB CMG VD Royal Army Service Corps
- Col. Magrath Fogarty Fegen, late Royal Artillery
- Maj. and Bt. Lt.-Col. John Gibson Fleming DSO Royal Engineers
- Capt. and Bt. Maj. Claude Howard Stanley Frankau DSO Royal Army Medical Corps
- Lt.-Col. Thomas Eraser DSO Royal Army Medical Corps
- Temp Capt. Forbes Fraser, Royal Army Medical Corps
- Maj. and Bt. Col. Evan Gibb CMG DSO Royal Army Service Corps
- Col. Thomas Wykes Gibbard CB KHS late Royal Army Medical Corps
- Lt.-Col. George Mills Goldsmith, Royal Army Medical Corps
- Maj. Charles Percy Graham DSO Welsh Regiment
- Col. Henry William Grattan DSO late Royal Army Medical Corps
- Maj. Archibald Montague Henry Gray, Royal Army Medical Corps
- Capt. Hon Frederick Edward Guest DSO MP 1st Life Guards
- Rt. Rev. Bishop Llewellyn Henry Gwynne CMG Royal Army Chaplains' Department
- Maj. John Robinson Harper, Royal Army Medical Corps
- Lt.-Col. and Bt. Col. Cholmeley Edward Carl Branfill Harrison CMG late Royal West Kent Regiment
- Temp Maj. Harold Hartley OBE MC Royal Engineers
- Lt.-Col. Edwin Charles Hayes, Royal Army Medical Corps
- Lt.-Col. Alan Major Henniker, Royal Engineers
- Temp Lt.-Col. Maxwell Hicks, Royal Army Service Corps
- Lt.-Col. Frederick William Higgs, Royal Army Medical Corps
- Temp Lt.-Col. Gordon Morgan Holmes CMG Royal Army Medical Corps
- Lt.-Col. Cyril Henry Howkins DSO Royal Army Medical Corps
- Col. Wilfrid Edward Hudleston CMG DSO late Royal Army Medical Corps
- Lt.-Col. and Bt. Col. Frederick Welsley Hunt CMG Royal Army Veterinary Corps
- Lt.-Col. Dermot Owen Hyde DSO Royal Army Medical Corps
- Maj. and Bt. Lt.-Col. George Scott Jackson DSO Northumberland Fusiliers and Royal Army Medical Corps
- Maj. Archibald Offley Jenney, Royal Scots
- Lt.-Col. Herbert William Graham Keddie DSO Royal Army Ordnance Corps
- Temp Col. Francis Kelly, Royal Army Medical Corps
- Maj. and Bt. Col. Charles Arthur Ker CMG DSO Royal Artillery
- Maj. Edmund Larken OBE Lincolnshire Yeomanry
- Lt.-Col. John Gage Lecky, Royal Army Service Corps
- Maj. and Bt. Lt.-Col. Reginald Francis Legge DSO Leinster Regiment
- Capt. Alexander Dunlop Lindsay MBE
- Temp Capt. Ernest Charles Lindsay FRCS Royal Army Medical Corps
- Col. John Constantine Gordon Longmore CMG DSO
- Temp Lt.-Col. David Lyell CMG DSO Royal Engineers
- Maj. Henry MacCormac MRCP Royal Army Medical Corps
- Lt.-Col. Arthur Maunsell MacLaughlin, Royal Army Medical Corps
- Col. Robert Lockhart Roes Macleod CB Royal Army Medical Corps
- Maj. and Bt. Lt.-Col. Arthur George Preston McNalty CMG Royal Army Service Corps
- Maj. and Bt. Lt.-Col. Hubert William Man DSO Royal Army Ordnance Corps
- Rev. Thomas Heywood Masters, Royal Army Chaplains' Department
- Temp Maj. Harry Maud DSO
- Temp Maj. Charles Hewitt Miller, Royal Army Medical Corps
- Lt.-Col. Edward Darley Miller DSO Pembroke Yeomanry
- Lt.-Col. and Bt. Col. Robert Cotton Money CMG King's Own Yorkshire Light Infantry
- Hon Col. Lord Henry Francis Montagu-Douglas-Scott
- Col. Frederick James Morgan CMG late Royal Army Medical Corps
- Maj. Alan Henry Lawrence Mount OBE Royal Engineers
- Temp Col. Percy Reginald Nelson OBE Royal Army Service Corps
- Col. Augustus Charles Newsom CMG Royal Army Veterinary Corps
- Maj. William Alfred Pallin DSO Royal Army Veterinary Corps
- Lt.-Col. Walter Bagot Pearson CMG Lancashire Fusiliers
- Maj. Ernest Middleton Perry FRCVS Royal Army Veterinary Corps
- Maj. Charles Duncan Peterkin, Gordon Highlanders
- Col. Edgar Montagu Pilcher CB DSO late Royal Army Medical Corps
- Lt.-Col. Charles Edward Pollock DSO Royal Army Medical Corps
- Maj. Robert Valentine Pollok DSO Irish Guards
- Col. Harold Vernon Prynne DSO late Royal Army Medical Corps
- Maj. and Bt. Lt.-Col. Frederick Walter Radcliffe CMG CIE Dorsetshire Regiment
- Lt.-Col. and Bt. Col. Jacob Pleydell-Bouverie, Earl of Radnor, T.F. Reserve
- Temp Lt.-Col. Charles Edward Ramsbottom-Isherwood
- Col. Herbert Frechville Smythe Ramsden, Indian Army
- Lt.-Col. and Bt. Col. Claude Rawnsley CMG DSO Royal Army Service Corps
- Lt.-Col. Frederick James Reid DSO Royal Army Service Corps
- Temp Lt.-Col. Regiriald Philip Neri Reynolds OBE Royal Engineers
- Capt. and Bt. Lt.-Col. Ambrose St. Quintin Ricardo CMG DSO Royal Inniskilling Fusiliers
- Temp Capt. and Bt. Maj. John Robertson, Royal Engineers
- Maj. and Bt. Lt.-Col. Hugh Stuart Rogers DSO Shropshire Light Infantry
- Lt.-Col. Thomas William Rudd, Royal Army Veterinary Corps
- Capt. Charles Frederick Morris Saint FRCS Royal Army Medical Corps
- Col. Harry Neptune Sargent CB DSO Royal Army Service Corps
- Lt.-Col. and Bt. Col. George-Walter Wrey Saville DSO Middlesex Regiment
- Temp Maj. Frank Searle DSO Tank Corps
- Maj. Francis Stewart Kennedy Shaw, Rem. Service
- Lt.-Col. John Payzant Silver DSO Royal Army Medical Corps
- Temp Lt.-Col. Lightly Stapleton Simpson DSO Royal Engineers
- Rev. Charles William Smith DSO Royal Army Chaplains' Department
- Lt.-Col. Charles Louis Spencer, Royal Engineers
- Temp Maj. Frederick Newton Gisbone Starr, Royal Army Medical Corps
- Col. John Charles Baron Statham CMG late Royal Army Medical Corps
- Maj. and Bt. Lt.-Col. Godfrey Robert Viveash Steward DSO Royal Inniskilling Fusiliers
- Rev. Frank White Stewart Royal Army Chaplains' Department
- Maj. and Bt. Lt.-Col. Sir George Murray Home Stirling Bt DSO Essex Regiment
- Temp Col. John Donald Sutherland
- Lt.-Col. Walter John Tatam CMG Royal Army Veterinary Corps
- Col. Hugh Stanley Thurston CB CMG late Royal Army Medical Corps
- Maj. and Bt. Lt.-Col. Percy Umfreville CMG
- Maj. Hon Osbert Eustace Vesey OBE Royal East Kent Yeomanry
- Maj. and Bt. Lt.-Col. Edward Gurth Wace DSO Royal Engineers
- Maj. and Bt. Lt.-Col. Edward John Wadley DSO Royal Army Veterinary Corps
- Temp Lt.-Col. Charles Waley Cohen
- Maj. and Bt. Lt.-Col. Mainwaring Ravell Walsh MC Worcestershire Regiment
- Temp Maj. Thomas Percival Wansbrough, Royal Army Service Corps
- Capt. and Bt. Maj. Henry Watkins, George, Coldstream Guards
- Lt.-Col. Francis Wyatt Watling DSO Royal Engineers
- Temp Col. Alfred Edward Webb-Johnson DSO Royal Army Medical Corps
- Lt.-Col. and Bt. Col. Frederick Hibbart Westmacott, Royal Army Medical Corps
- Maj. and Bt. Lt.-Col. James Whitehead DSO 1st Brahmans, Indian Army
- Lt.-Col. Ernest Arnold Wraith DSO Royal Army Medical Corps

Canadian Overseas Forces

- Col. Lorne Drum
- Rev. George Oliver Fallis, Canadian Army Chaplains' Department
- Lt.-Col. Atholl Edwin Griffin DSO Canadian Railway Troops
- Lt.-Col. Edward Vincent Hogan, Canadian Army Medical Corps
- Maj. Herbert Molsom MC Quebec Regiment
- Lt.-Col. Blair Ripley DSO Canadian Railway Troops
- Col. Robert Mills Simpson DSO
- Lt.-Col. Charles Perry Templeton DSO Canadian Army Medical Corps
- Lt.-Col. Guy Mansfield Todd, Canadian Army Pay Corps
- Maj. Arthur William Roger Wilby
- Lt.-Col. Francis Walter Ernest Wilson, Canadian Army Medical Corps

Australian Imperial Forces

- Col. Charles Herbert Davis DSO VD
- Lt.-Col. Edwin Thomas Leane, Australian Army Ordnance Corps
- Col. Alexander Hammett Marks DSO
- Col. Arthur Edmund Shepherd DSO
- Col. Walter Howard Tunbridge CB CMG VD
- Lt.-Col. Horace George Viney CMG DSO

South African Forces

- Capt. Charles de Vertus Duff, 2nd Res. Battalion

For valuable services rendered in connection with military operations in German South West Africa —

- Temp Maj. and Bt. Lt.-Col. Albert Henry Mortimer Nussey DSO

For valuable services rendered in connection with military operations in Italy —

- Maj. and Bt. Lt.-Col. Robert Morris Campbell CMG Royal Army Service Corps
- Temp Lt.-Col. Sir William Stewart Dick-Cunyngham Bt
- Col. Thomas Wyatt Hale CB CMG Royal Army Ordnance Corps
- Capt. Thomas Phillips Bobbins, Royal Engineers
- Lt.-Col. James Currie Robertson CMG CIE Indian Medical Service
- Maj. Ernest Albert Rose OBE Royal Army Service Corps
- Maj. Williams Hugh Cecil Rowe OBE Royal Army Service Corps
- Temp Lt.-Col. Robert Stephenson DSO South Staffordshire Regiment
- Lt.-Col. Hugh Godfrey Killigrew Wait DSO Royal Engineers
- Rev. Owen Spencer Watkins CMG Royal Army Chaplains' Department

For valuable services rendered in connection with military operations in North Russia (Murmansk Command) —

- Col. Gilbert Sutherland McDowell Elliot, Royal Engineers

For valuable services rendered in connection with military operations in Mesopotamia —

- Temp Lt.-Col. Philip Henry Browne OBE
- Maj. and Bt. Lt.-Col. James Clare Macnamara Canny DSO Royal Army Service Corps
- Capt. and Bt. Maj. Frank Button Frost MC Supply and Transport Ops Indian Army
- Temp Maj. Robert George Garrow OBE Royal Engineers
- Col. Elliot Brownlow Lang
- Maj. and Bt. Lt.-Col. Francis William George Leland DSO Royal Army Service Corps
- Temp Maj. Robert Scarth Farquhar Macrae OBE
- Maj. and Bt. Lt.-Col. Robert Henry McVittie CMG Royal Army Ordnance Corps
- Col. Arthur Hugh Morris
- Lt.-Col. Hugh Murray Morton DSO Royal Army Medical Corps
- Temp Maj. Harold Edward Ratsey DSO Royal Engineers
- Col. William Henderson Starr CB CMG
- Maj. Colin Percy Tremlett, Devonshire Regiment
- Temp Maj. Egerton Danford Truman OBE Royal Engineers
- Maj. and Bt. Lt.-Col. William Albert Wood, Royal Army Veterinary Corps

In recognition of distinguished services rendered during the War—

- Lt.-Col. Ralph Kirkby Bagnall-Wild CMG Royal Engineers
- Lt.-Col. Bryan Cole Bartley
- Col. Arthur Milton, Bent CMG Royal Munster Fusiliers
- Lt.-Col. the Hon John David Boyle DSO Rifle Brigadef
- Lt.-Col. Charles Stuart Burnett DSO Highland Light Infantry
- Col. Bertram Hewett Hunter Cooke CMG DSO Rifle Brigade
- Lt.-Col. Edward Humphrey Davidson OBE MC Gordon Highlanders
- Col. Bertie Clephane Hawley Drew CMG Indian Army
- Lt.-Col. John Dunville OBE
- Maj.-Gen. Edward Leonard Ellington CB CMG Royal Artillery
- Lt.-Col. Philip Lee William Herbert CMG Nottinghamshire and Derbyshire Regiment
- Lt.-Col. Cuthbert Gurney Hoare CMG Indian Army
- Lt.-Col. Charles Frewen Jenkin MBE
- Lt.-Col. Cecil Colvile Marindin DSO Royal Artillery
- Maj. Edward Patrick Alexander Melville OBE Indian Army
- Lt.-Col. Robert Henry More CMG Imperial Yeomanry
- Lt.-Col. Redford Henry Mulock DSO
- Lt.-Col. Cyril Louis Norton Newall CMG Indian Army
- Maj. Edward Osmond
- Col. Duncan Le Geyt Pitcher CMG DSO Indian Army
- Lt.-Col. Reginald Edmund Maghlin Russell DSO Royal Engineers
- Maj. William John Ryan OBE Army Service Corps
- Lt.-Col. Sydney Ernest Smith OBE Gloucestershire Regiment
- Col. Oliver Swann CB
- Lt.-Col. Arthur Sykes OBE Royal Irish Fusiliers
- Lt.-Col. James George Weir CMG Royal Field Artillery
- Lt.-Col. Hardy Vesey Wells
- Col. Kenneth Wigram CB DSO Indian Army

In recognition of services of in connection with the War —

Royal Navy

- Surgeon Capt. Octavius William Andrews
- Maj. George Edward Barnes, Royal Marine Artillery
- Maj. Dacre Lennard Barrett, Royal Marine Light Infantry
- Capt. Ronald Evered Chilcott
- Capt. Arthur Calvert Clarke CMG DSO RNR (Vice-Admiral, retired)
- Rear-Admiral Lewis Clinton-Baker CB
- Paymaster Commander Beauchamp Urquhart Colclough
- Engineer Capt. Arthur Samuel Crisp
- Maj. William Price Drury, Royal Marine Light Infantry
- Paymaster Capt. Edward Henry Eldred
- Engineer Capt. Samuel Pringle Ferguson
- Capt. Ernest James Fleet RNR (Rear-Admiral, retired)
- Lt.-Col. Gerald Noel Anstice Harris OBE Royal Marine Artillery
- Capt. Edward Henry Fitzhardinge Heaton-Ellis CB MVO ADC
- Capt. Thomas Henry Heming
- Engineer Capt. William Fryer Hinchcliffe
- Paymaster Commander John Dickenson Holmes
- Temp Lt.-Col. the Hon. Cuthbert James, Royal Marines
- Chaplain and Instructor Commander the Rev. Percy Herbert Jones
- Chaplain and Instructor Commander the Rev. Robert McKew
- Paymaster Capt. Charles Edward Hughes Meredyth
- Engineer Capt. Herbert Brooks Moorshead
- Paymaster Capt. William George Edward Penfold
- Engineer Capt. John David Rees
- Engineer Capt. Ernest William Rodet
- Capt. Frank Edward Cavendish Ryan RNR (Rear-Admiral, retired)
- Paymaster Capt. Ernest Edwin Silk
- Engineer Capt. George Thomas Simmons
- Capt. Morris Henry Smyth RNR (Vice-Admiral, retired)
- Engineer Capt. Lindsay James Stephens
- Engineer Capt. Charles Stevens
- Engineer Capt. John Greet Stevens
- Capt. Arthur Trevelyan Taylor
- Capt. Leicester Francis Gartside Tippinge
- Engineer Capt. Albert Edward Tompkins
- Capt. Francis Loftus Tottenham
- Maj. Arthur Gustave Vincent, Royal Marine Light Infantry
- Paymaster Capt. Charles Henry Allem Ward
- Capt. John Alexander Webster MVO
- Paymaster Commander Charles Scrivener Wonham
- Capt. William Bourchier Sherard Wrey CMG
- Capt. Fred W. Young OBE RNR

For valuable services rendered in connection with the War —

Army

- Col. Archibald John Chapman CB CMG Royal Dublin Fusiliers
- Col. Hugh Montgomerie Sinclair CB CMG Royal Engineers
- Lt.-Col. Harry Gilbert Barling CB FRCS Royal Army Medical Corps
- Maj. and Bt. Lt.-Col. David Forster DSO Royal Engineers
- Temp Maj. and Bt. Lt.-Col. Woodbine Parish
- Maj. James Swain CB FRCS Royal Army Medical Corps
- Col. Hugh Robert Adair
- Col. Gofton Gee Adams
- Maj. and Bt. Lt.-Col. Lewis Charles Adams, Royal Artillery
- Lt.-Col. Robert Hay Adamson, Royal Garrison Artillery
- Rev. Josiah George Alford VD Royal Army Chaplains' Department
- Col. Thomas Graves Lowry Herbert Armstrong
- Temp Lt.-Col. Sir Robert Armstrong-Jones FRCP FRCS Royal Army Medical Corps
- Maj. Andrew Aytoun CMG DSO Argyll and Sutherland Highlanders
- Col. Alfred John Bailey TD
- Temp Maj. Robert Leatham Barclay OBE Norfolk Yeomanry
- Maj. and Bt. Lt.-Col. Hon Everard Baring CVO 10th Hussars
- Lt.-Col. Frederick George Barker
- Temp Maj. John Barrett-Lennard
- Lt.-Col. and Bt. Col. Stanley Leonard Barry CMG DSO MVO Northamptonshire Regiment
- Col. Alfred Yarker Barton
- Lt.-Col. Reginald Cossley Batt MVO Royal Fusiliers
- Col. Frederick Baylay
- Maj. and Bt. Lt.-Col. Arthur George Bayley DSO Oxfordshire and Buckinghamshire Light Infantry
- Capt. and Bt. Lt.-Col. Roger Hammet Beadon, Royal Army Service Corps
- Capt. Sir Frank Beauchamp Bt Royal Army Service Corps
- Lt.-Col. Andrew Cracroft Beoher, Norfolk Regiment
- Temp Maj. Frank Bedford-Glasier CMG
- Maj. Sydney Belfield, Royal Artillery
- Lt.-Col. William Kingsmill Bernard, Royal Army Service Corps
- Rev. Monsignor Francis Bickerstaffe-Drew Royal Army Chaplains' Department
- Capt. and Bt. Maj. Hon Charles Clive Bigham CMG Grenadier Guards
- Temp Lt.-Col. Lawson Billington, Royal Engineers
- Lt.-Col. George Christopher McDowall Birdwood, Rem. Service
- Col. William Cuthbert Blackett TD DL
- Lt.-Col. Laurence James Blandford Royal Army Medical Corps
- Lt.-Col. Thomas Gordon Cumming Bliss, Army Pay Department
- Lt.-Col. Charles Jasper Blunt, Royal Army Ordnance Corps
- Lt.-Col. James Blyth, Oxfordshire and Buckinghamshire Light Infantry
- Maj. and Bt. Lt.-Col. George Orlebar Boase, Royal Artillery
- Lt.-Col. Dennis Fortescue Boles JP MP 3rd Devonshire Regiment
- Capt. George Edward N-ussey Booker, Res. R. Cav
- Lt.-Col. and Bt. Col. Joseph Ignatius Bonomi, South Lancashire Regiment
- Maj. William Arthur Travell Bowly MC
- Col. Mossom Archibald Boyd
- Temp Maj. and Bt. Lt.-Col. Frederick Sadlier Brereton, Royal Army Medical Corps
- Col. Walter Bromilow
- Maj. and Bt. Col. Ronald George Brooke DSO 3rd Res. Cav. Regiment
- Maj. and Bt. Lt.-Col. William George Charteris Brown, Royal Engineers (dated 24 May 1919)
- Bt. Col. Abraham Walker Browne, Royal Army Medical Corps
- Col. Charles William Brownlow CMG DSO Royal Artillery
- Maj. Clarence Dalrymple Bruce, West Riding Regiment
- Maj. and Bt. Lt.-Col. Frederick Carkeet Bryant CMG DSO Royal Artillery
- Lt.-Col. Charles Forbes Buchan
- Capt. Cuthbert Buckle, Royal Garrison Artillery
- Temp Lt.-Col. George Alexander MacLean Buckley DSO
- Col. Rowland Burdon VD
- Col. John Francis Burn-Murdoch CB CMG
- Lt.-Col. and Bt. Col. Rainald Owen Burne, Royal Army Service Corps
- Col. Herbert Henry Burney CB
- Temp Lt.-Col. Sir Merrik Raymond Burrell, Rem. Service
- Lt.-Col. and Bt. Col. Edmund Augustine Burrows CMG Royal Artillery
- Col. Henry Hugh Butler, late Royal Artillery
- Col. William John Bythell, Royal Engineers
- Lt.-Col. Harry Ernest Cadell, Royal Artillery
- Temp Capt. Norman Macleod Buchan, Earl of Caithness, Gordon Highlanders
- Col. Thomas Charles Pleydell Calley CB MVO
- Lt.-Col. James Calvert Royal Army Medical Corps
- Maj. and Bt. Lt.-Col. Hon Ralph Alexander Campbell, Lovat's Scouts Yeomanry
- Col. William MacLaren Campbell MVO
- Lt.-Col. and Bt. Col. George Hereward Gardew DSO Royal Army Service Corps
- Temp Col. Albert Carless FRCS Army Medical Service
- Col. Montgomery Launcelot Carleton
- Col. Edward Elliot Carr CB
- Col. Charles Herbert Philip Carter CB CMG
- Lt.-Col. and Bt. Col. Ernest Augustus Frederick Carter, Royal Lancaster Regiment
- Lt.-Col. George Harrison Champion de Crespigny, late Northamptonshire Regiment
- Temp Col. Sir Arthur Chance FRCS Army Medical Service
- Lt.-Col. Frank Beauchamp Macaulay Chatterton CMG Royal Army Service Corps
- Hon Brig. Gen. Hugh Cecil Cholmondeley CB Shropshire T.F.A
- Temp Maj. Herman Clarke, Royal Engineers
- Temp Capt. Ernest Charles Clay OBE
- Hon Col. Ernest Thomas Clifford VD Royal Engineers
- Col. Waiter Rees Clifford
- Maj. Herbert Cleeve, Royal Army Service Corps
- Lt.-Col. George Cockburn DSO late Rifle Brigade
- Lt.-Col. and Bt. Col. Hugh Fortescue Coleridge DSO Middlesex Regiment
- Lt.-Col. Alexander Arthur Lysons Collard, Army Pay Department
- Col. Arthur William Collard
- Lt.-Col. Forrester Farnell Colvin, 2nd Dragoons
- Col. Gwynnedd Conway Gordon, late Royal Army Service Corps
- Col. Harry Cooper CMG
- Lt.-Col. and Bt. Col. Reginald James Cope Cottell, Royal Army Medical Corps
- Capt. Arthur George Cousins, London Regiment
- Maj. Edward Geoffrey Hippisley Cox, London Regiment
- Temp Lt.-Col. Maurice Craig FRCP Royal Army Medical Corps
- Lt.-Col. Robert Anneeley Craig CMG Royal Artillery
- Lt.-Col. and Bt. Col. Philip John Ribton Crampton, late Royal Artillery
- Lt.-Col. Edmund Henry Bertram Craster, Royal Garrison Artillery
- Col. Cyril Randell Crofton-Atkins
- Rev. William Thomas Rupert Crookham, Royal Army Chaplains' Department
- Col. Montagu Creighton Curry CB DSO
- Col. George Glencairn Cunningham CB DSO late Royal Scots
- Col. Frederick Francis Williamson Daniell
- Col. Edmund William Dashwood
- Lt.-Col. and Bt. Col. Richard Woodforde Deane, late Staff
- Lt.-Col. Cecil de Courcy Etheridge DSO East Yorkshire Regiment
- Col. Sir James de Hoghton Bt
- Lt.-Col. and Bt. Col. William Grant de Jersey, late Royal Artillery
- Maj. and Bt. Lt.-Col. Herman Gaston de Watteville, Royal Artillery
- Col. Henry Denison CB
- Maj. and Bt. Lt.-Col. John Crampton Morton Doran DSO Royal Army Service Corps
- Lt.-Col. Vickers Dunfee, London Regiment
- Lt.-Col. and Bt. Col. William Dunne CB late Royal Army Service Corps
- Maj. Philip George Easton DSO Royal Army Medical Corps
- Quartermaster and Lt.-Col. James Heslam Edmondson, Royal Army Service Corps
- Lt.-Col. Henry John Edwards OBE
- Temp Maj. William Bickerton Edwards OBE Royal Army Medical Corps
- Col. Michael Henry Egan CMG
- Col. Charles Conyngham Ellis CB
- Henrietta Christobel Ellis OBE Commandant, Women's Legion
- Christiana Deanes Elmslie RRC Matron, Queen Alexandra's Imperial Military Nursing Service Reserve
- Lt.-Col. Harold Carleton Wetherall Eteson, Royal Artillery
- Maj. and Bt. Lt.-Col. Arthur Spenser Loat Farquharson, Officers Training Corps, Oxford University
- Brig. Gen. Robert Black Fell CB
- Capt. and Bt. Maj. Edward Hurry Fenwick FRCS Royal Army Medical Corps
- Maj. and Bt. Lt.-Col. Henry Minchin Ferrar, Rem. Service
- Lt.-Col. Hamilton Walter Edward Finch DSO Middlesex Regiment
- Maj. and Bt. Lt.-Col. Harold Findlay, East Kent Regiment
- Lt.-Col. Herbert Mayow Fisher-Rowe, Surrey Yeomanry
- Maj. and Bt. Lt.-Col. Ernest Richard Fitzpatrick DSO North Lancashire Regiment
- Lt.-Col. Sir William Charles de Meuron Wentworth-Fitzwilliam, Earl Fitzwilliam KCVO DSO West Riding Royal Horse Artillery
- Lt.-Col. Frank Wigram Foley DSO Royal Berkshire Regiment
- Lt.-Col. Henry Spencer Follett, 7th Dragoon Guards
- Lt.-Col. Alfred James Foster CMG Northumberland Fas
- Temp Maj. Arthur Bruce Foster
- Maj. and Bt. Lt.-Col. Henry Needham Foster CMG Royal Army Service Corps
- Temp Lt.-Col. Charles John Francis, Royal Engineers
- Lt.-Col. John Pilling Fraser TD Royal Engineers
- Lt.-Col. Herbert French FRCP Royal Army Medical Corps
- Maj. and Bt. Lt.-Col. Cyril Halsted Frith, Oxfordshire and Buckinghamshire Light Infantry
- Maj. Charles James Hookham Gardner, Yorkshire Regiment
- Lt.-Col. Arthur Newson Bruff Garrett, Shropshire Light Infantry
- Col. John Samuel Gaussen, Army Pay Department
- Lt.-Col. George Hessing Geddes CB Royal Artillery
- Lt.-Col. and Bt. Col. Archibald Burns Gemmel, Royal Army Medical Corps
- Col. Arthur Robert Gilbert DSO
- Col. Frederick Charles Almon Gilpin CB
- Maj. Joseph Henry Russell Bailey, Lord Glanusk CB DSO Grenadier Guards
- Col. John William Godfray CB CVO ADC
- Temp Hon Lt.-Col. Mervyn Henry Gordon CMG Royal Army Medical Corps
- Col. Charles Steward Gordon-Steward
- Temp Capt. Ronald Gorell Barnes, Lord Gorell OBE MC
- Col. Edmund Howard Gorges CB DSO
- Maj. Alan Percy George Gough CMG DSO late Denbigh Hussars
- Lt.-Col. Sir Alfred Pearce Gould KCVO FRCS Royal Army Medical Corps
- Capt. Gilbert Maxwell Adair Graham OBE
- Maj. John Henry Maitland Greenly, Herefordshire Regiment
- Lt.-Col. Robert Alexander Greg, Cheshire Regiment
- Lt.-Col. John Gretton VD North Staffordshire Regiment
- Maj. and Bt. Lt.-Col. Walter Harold Gribbon CMG Royal Lancaster Regiment
- Col. Edward Aickin William Stewart Grove CB
- Col. Frederick Hacket-Thompson CB
- Col. Robert Isaa Dalby Hackett Royal Army Medical Corps
- Ven. Archdeacon Henry Armstrong Hall, Royal Army Chaplains' Department
- Maj. Sir John Richard Hall Bt Irish Guards
- Maj. and Bt. Lt.-Col. Harold Everard Hambro, Rem. Service, late Royal Artillery
- Col. Arthur Francis Hamilton-Cox, Army Pay Department
- Maj. and Bt. Lt.-Col. Frederick Dawson Hammond DSO Royal Engineers
- Maj. John Cyril Giffard Alers Hankey OBE MVO Royal Artillery
- Maj. and Bt. Lt.-Col. Charles Tristram Melville Hare, Leicestershire Regiment
- Lt.-Col. and Bt. Col. Louis Kenneth Harrison Royal Army Medical Corps
- Lt.-Col. and Hon Col. Charles Joseph Hart CB TD late Royal Warwickshire Regiment
- Lt.-Col. David Harvey CMG Royal Army Medical Corps
- Lt.-Col. and Bt. Col. Herbert Pennell Hawkins, Royal Army Medical Corps
- Lt.-Col. Kenneth Edward Haynes CMG Royal Artillery
- Maj. Charles Henry Brabazon Heaton-Ellis, Bedfordshire Regiment
- Temp Lt. John Percival Helliwell
- Col. Hon Walter George Hepburne-Scott, Master of Polwarth VD Royal Scots
- Hon Brig. Gen. Thomas Heron CB Royal Army Ordnance Corps
- Lt.-Col. Rawdon John Isherwood Hesketh, Royal Fusiliers
- Maj. and Bt. Lt.-Col. Robert Knox Hezlet DSO Royal Artillery
- Maj. Charles Henry Hill OBE York and Lancaster Regiment
- Temp Lt.-Col. Francis Robert Hill Royal Army Medical Corps
- Lt.-Col. Robert Montague Hill, Royal Garrison Artillery
- Temp Maj. Walter de Marchet Hill, Royal Army Medical Corps
- Maj. Ectmond Herbert Hills CMG late Royal Engineers
- Jane Hoadley RRC Matron Queen Alexandra's Imperial Military Nursing Service
- Bt. Lt.-Col. Sir George Lindsay Holford KCVO CIE late 1st Life Guards
- Maj. and Bt. Lt.-Col. Hardress Gilbert Holmes CMG Yorkshire Regiment
- Rev. Arthur Venables Calvely Hordern CMG Royal Army Chaplains' Department
- Emilie Hilda Horniblow OBE Chief Controller, Queen Mary's Army Auxiliary Corps
- Maj. John Cunningham Moore Hoskyn DSO Indian Army
- Lt.-Col. Francis James Leigh Howard DSO Royal Army Service Corps
- Lt.-Col. and Bt. Col. Randall Charles Annesley Lowe OBE York and Lancaster Regiment
- Col. John James Francis Hume
- Lt.-Col. and Bt. Col. Godfrey Massy Vere Hunt, Royal Army Service Corps
- Col. Edgar Assheton Iremonger, late Durham Light Infantry
- Lt.-Col. Archibald Jack, Royal Engineers
- Temp Maj. Frederick James, Royal Army Service Corps
- Rev. Canon Sidney Rhodes James, Royal Army Chaplains' Department
- Col. Noble Fleming Jenkins CMG
- Lt.-Col. Edward Charles Jennings, Royal Fusiliers
- Lt.-Col. Augustus George Aimes Jerrard, Somerset Light Infantry
- Col. Henry Halcro Johnston CB late Royal Army Medical Corps
- Col. Osmond Moncrieff Johnston, late Army Pay Department
- Lt.-Col. and Bt. Col. Hope Johnstone, Royal Artillery
- Temp Lt.-Col. Cyril Vivian Jones, Royal Army Service Corps
- Maj.-Gen. Oliver Richard Archer Julian CB CMG Army Medical Service
- Maj. Richard Henry Keane OBE
- Temp Lt.-Col. Charles Leslie Kempton, Royal Engineers
- Lt.-Col. and Bt. Col. Henry Gerard Hegan Kennard, 5th Dragoon Guards
- Lt.-Col. Edmund Gibbs Kimber DSO TD London Regiment
- Col. Charles Dickson King, late Royal Artillery
- Maj. John Charles Kirk OBE Royal Field Artillery
- Lt.-Col. Ivone Kirkpatrick, late South Staffordshire Regiment
- Lt.-Col. and Bt. Col. Lancelot Charles Koe, late Royal Garrison Artillery
- Col. William Henry Land VD
- Lt.-Col. and Bt. Col. Samuel Wellington Lane, Royal Artillery
- Lt.-Col. and Bt. Col. John Penrice Langley, Royal Artillery
- Maj. Reginald Nesbitt Wingfield Larking, late Scots Guards
- Col. Harold Pemberton Leach CB DSO Royal Engineers
- Lt.-Col. Kenneth John Walters Leather, Durham Light Infantry, Special Reserve
- Col. Francis Lee
- Lt.-Col. Charles Archibald Lees, Royal Army Medical Corps
- Maj. and Bt. Lt.-Col. Alfred Digby Legard, King's Royal Rifle Corps
- Capt. Henry Gordon Leith, Northumberland Yeomanry
- Lt.-Col. Edward Thomas Le Marchant, Royal Fusiliers
- Temp Lt.-Col. Gerald MacLean Lemonius, Liverpool Regiment
- Lt.-Col. and Bt. Col. Frederick Amelius Le Poer Trench CB Royal Army Service Corps
- Lt.-Col. Sir John Leslie Bt Royal Irish Fusiliers
- Maj. Cecil Bingham Levita MVO Royal Horse Artillery
- Maj. and Bt. Lt.-Col. Clive Gerard Liddell CMG DSO Leicestershire Regiment
- Col. Malcolm Orme Little CB
- Maj. and Bt. Col. Samuel Eyre Massy Lloyd, Suffolk Regiment
- Lt.-Col. Charles John Lloyd-Carson, East Lancashire Regiment
- Temp Lt.-Col. John Robert Lord Royal Army Medical Corps
- Col. Alfred Crowdy Lovett CB (dated 26 May 1919)
- Col. James Lowry, Army Pay Department
- Col. Edmund Ranald Owen Ludlow CB Royal Army Service Corps
- Maj. and Bt. Lt.-Col. Arthur Pearson Luff Royal Army Medical Corps
- Lt.-Col. and Bt. Col. Hugh Thomas Lyle DSO Royal Welsh Fusiliers
- Capt. and Bt. Lt.-Col. David Lynch, Rem. Service
- Col. Barklie Cairns McCalmont CB
- Maj. Robert Arthur McClymont DSO Royal Artillery
- Lt.-Col. Edwin Millar Gilliland McFerran, Royal Irish Rifles
- Col. Robert Campbell McKenzie CB VD
- Temp Maj. and Hon Lt.- Corporal John McKie DSO
- Hon Col. Alfred Donald Mackintosh of Mackintosh
- Col. George Mackintosh CB
- Rev. Ewen George Fitzroy Macpherson CMG Royal Army Chaplains' Department
- Col. Charles John Markham
- Col. John Marriott DSO MVO
- Lt.-Col. and Bt. Col. Frank Marsh FRCS Royal Army Medical Corps
- Lt.-Col. Ernest Edmund Martin CMG FRCVS Royal Army Veterinary Corps
- Lt.-Col. James Fitzgerald Martin CMG Royal Army Medical Corps
- Col. Henry Marwood
- Lt.-Col. and Bt. Col. David James Mason-MacFarlane CMG Seaforth Highlanders
- Lt.-Col. and Bt. Col. Percy Hugh Hamon Massy
- Lt.-Col. Francis Richard Maunsell CMG late Royal Artillery
- Col. Charles Stuart Meeres OBE late Royal Artillery
- Lt.-Col. James Austen Meldon, Royal Dublin Fusiliers
- Maj. Robert Ramsden Mellor, Special Reserve
- Maj.-Bertram Metcalfe-Smith
- Maj. and Bt. Lt.-Col. Henry Andrew Micklem CMG DSO Royal Engineers
- Maj. and Bt. Lt.-Col. William Crawfurd Middleton, Rem. Service
- Temp Lt.-Col. George Edward Miles, Royal Army Medical Corps
- Lt.-Col. and Bt. Col. Hugh de Burgh Miller DSO Royal Artillery
- Col. Edward Montagu
- Col. Arthur Trevelyan Moore, Royal Engineers
- Lt.-Col. and Bt. Col. Robert Reginald Heber Moore Royal Army Medical Corps
- Col. William Moore-Lane, Royal Army Ordnance Corps
- Lt.-Col. AlexanderBraithwaite Morgan, Army Pay Department
- Maj. and Bt. Lt.-Col. Edward Morton, Cheshire Regiment
- Lt.-Col. and Bt. Col. Charles William Mansell Moullin FRCS Royal Army Medical Corps
- Col. George Herbert Muller VD
- Rev. William Murphy, Royal Army Chaplains' Department
- Lt.-Col. Eric Madden Murray, Army Pay Department
- Maj. and Bt. Lt.-Col. Arthur Murray-Smith, Royal Garrison Artillery
- Col. Edgar Forbes Nelson
- Lt.-Col. Edward John Neve, Army Pay Department
- Col. Edmund Wcoitt Newland, Army Pay Department
- Temp Maj. Herbert Niblett DSO Royal Army Service Corps
- Maj. and Bt. Lt.-Col. Louis Hemington Noblett, Royal Irish Rifles
- Maj. and Bt. Lt.-Col. Alan Ian Percy, Duke of Northumberland MVO Grenadier Guards
- Maj. and Bt. Lt.-Col. Walter Vyvian Nugent DSO Royal Artillery
- Col. Edmund Donough John O'Brien CB
- Temp Col. Joseph Francis O'Carrol Army Medical Service
- Lt.-Col. and Bt. Col. Montague Ernest O'Donoghue, late Indian Army
- Col. Tom Evelyn O'Leary CB CMG
- Rev. Richard John Deane Oliver Royal Army Chaplains' Department
- Lt.-Col. John Kevin O'Meagher, late Royal Munster Fusiliers
- Lt.-Col. Cranley Charlton Onslow CMG DSO Bedfordshire Regiment
- Lt.-Col. Francis George Rodney Ostrehan, Indian Army
- Col. Daniel O'Sullivan, Army Medical Service
- Temp Maj. William Hugh Owen, Royal Engineers
- Lt.-Col. and Bt. Col. Robert Leonce Owens, Royal Irish Regiment
- Maj. and Bt. Lt.-Col. Clements Parr, late Oxfordshire and Buckinghamshire Light Infantry
- Maj. and Bt. Lt.-Col. Henry Jules Parry DSO Royal Army Medical Corps
- Lt.-Col. Llewelyn England Sidney Parry DSO TD Denbigh Yeomanry
- Temp Col. John Herbert Parsons FRCS Army Medical Service
- Temp Lt.-Col. Andrew Melville Paterson FRCS Royal Army Medical Corps (dated 12 February 1919)
- Col. Stanley Paterson
- Rev. Charles Alfred Peacock Royal Army Chaplains' Department
- Lt.-Col. Cyril Harvey Pearee, Yorkshire Regiment
- Lt.-Col. George Thomson Pearson, Royal Field Artillery
- Col. Charles Cecil Perceval, Royal Engineers
- Col. Edwin King Perkins VD DL
- Temp Lt.-Col. Hugh Wharton Perkins OBE
- Temp Maj. and Bt. Lt.-Col. George Ingleton Phillips, Royal Warwickshire Regiment
- Lt.-Col. Cuthbert Joseph Pike, Duke of Cornwall's Light Infantry
- Lt.-Col. Henry Quinten Pinhorn, Army Pay Department
- Lt.-Col. Edward Abadie Plunkett, Lincolnshire Regiment
- Maj. Arthur Faulconer Poulton, Royal Army Service Corps
- Maj. and Bt. Lt.-Col. Philip Lionel William Powell DSO Welsh Regiment
- Col. Theodore John Warrender Prendergast, Royal Engineers
- Rev. Edward Herbert Pulling, Royal Army Chaplains' Department
- Lt.-Col. John Spottiswoode Purvis, Royal Engineers
- Temp Maj. Henry Stanley Raper, Royal Engineers
- Lt.-Col. Sir James Farquharson Remnant Bt Royal Army Service Corps
- Gertrude Mary Richards RRC Matron, Queen Alexandra's Imperial Military Nursing Service
- Lt.-Col. and Bt. Col. Arthur Noel Roberts, late Royal Army Service Corps
- Lt.-Col. and Bt. Col. Henry Robert Roberts, late Lincolnshire Regiment
- Lt.-Col. Lancelot William Rolleston Royal Army Medical Corps
- Col. Alexander William Roper CB Royal Engineers
- Temp Hon Lt.-Col. Richard Gundry Rows Royal Army Medical Corps
- Maj. and Bt. Lt.-Col. Morris Boscawen Savage DSO South Staffordshire Regiment
- Maj. Charles Edward Sawyer, late North Lancashire Regiment
- Lt.-Col. and Bt. Col. George Peabody Scholfield CMG Royal Engineers
- Rev. William John Selby, Royal Army Chaplains' Department
- Col. Sir Anthony Ashley-Cooper, Earl of Shaftesbury KP KCVO
- Hon Col. Sir Walter Geoffrey Shakerley Bt TD
- Maj. and Bt. Lt.-Col. Charles Shawe, Rifle Brigade
- Temp Col. James Sherren FRCS Royal Army Medical Corps
- Anne Beadsmore Smith RRC Principal Matron, Queen Alexandra's Imperial Military Nursing Service
- Lt.-Col. Peter Caldwell Smith, Royal Army Medical Corps
- Maj. and Bt. Col. James William Smith-Keill, Scots Guards
- Lt.-Col. and Bt. Col. Walter Charles Smithson DSO late 13th Hussars
- Col. Robert Napier Smyth DSO
- Margaret Elwyn Sparshott RRC Territorial Force Nursing Service
- Capt. and Bt. Lt.-Col. Edward Louis Spiers MC 11th Hussars
- Col. James Rawdon Stansfeld CB late Royal Artillery
- Temp Hon Lt.-Col. Thomas Edward Knowles Stansfield Royal Army Medical Corps
- Lt.-Col. John Frederick Stenning CB Unattd. List
- Maj. and Bt. Lt.-Col. Patrick Alexander Vansitart Stewart DSO King's Own Scottish Borderers
- Col. William Robert Stewart CB late Royal Engineers
- Maj. and Bt. Lt.-Col. George Herbert Stobart DSO Royal Field Artillery
- Temp Maj. Robert John Stordy DSO Royal Army Veterinary Corps
- Lt.-Col. George Edward John Mowbray Rous, Earl of Stradbroke CB CVO DL JP ADC Royal Field Artillery
- Maj. Edward Lisle Strutt DSO Royal Scots
- Lt.-Col. Ernest Frederic Sulivan, East Surrey Regiment
- Maj. George Kilner Swettenham DSO Royal Irish Rifles
- Maj. Charles Newton Taylor, London Regiment
- Temp Maj. Harold Blake Taylor, Royal Engineers
- Col. Sir Godfrey Vignoles Thomas Bt CB DSO (dated 16 February 1919)
- Maj. and Bt. Lt.-Col. Reginald Aneurin Thomas, Royal Artillery
- Maj. Christopher Birdwood Thomson DSO Royal Engineers
- Temp Lt.-Col. David George Thqfrnson Royal Army Medical Corps
- Lt.-Col. Charles Mytton Thornycroft DSO Manchester Regiment
- Lt.-Col. and Bt. Col. Hayford Douglas Thorold, late West Riding Regiment
- Col. Willoughby Thuillier
- Lt.-Col. Norman Eccles Tilney DSO Royal Field Artillery
- Col. Octavius Todd late Royal Army Medical Corps
- Col. Francis William Towsey CMG DSO
- Capt. and Bt. Maj. Guy Elliston Toynbee CMG Royal Army Service Corps
- Maj. Philip Christian William Trevor, Royal Army Ordnance Corps
- Maj. William Kington Tucker OBE Royal Army Service Corps
- Rev. James Grove White Tuckey KHC Royal Army Chaplains' Department
- Col. Archer Lloyd Marischal Turner
- Col. John Henry Twiss CB late Royal Engineers
- Col. Charles Robert Tyrrell CB late Royal Army Medical Corps
- Maj. and Bt. Lt.-Col. Henry Martley Vandeleur, Royal Artillery
- Col. Casimir Henry Claude Van Straubenzee CB
- Lt.-Col. Sir Charles Cheers Wakefield Bt Royal Garrison Artillery
- Lt.-Col. Francis Spring Walker FRCS Royal Army Medical Corps
- Lt.-Col. Montagu Charles Pearson Ward, Royal Artillery
- Capt. and Bt. Maj. Thomas Richard Pennefather Warren, Royal Army Service Corps
- Lt.-Col. Fredric Mostyn Watkins, Army Pay Department
- Maj. and Bt. Lt.-Col. Bromley George Vere Way MVO Nottinghamshire and Derbyshire Regiment
- Col. John Sutton Edward Western, Indian Army
- Col. Claude Beruers Westmacott ADC
- Lt.-Col. Sinclair White FRCS Royal Army Medical Corps
- Maj. Francis Vernon Willey CMG Nottinghamshire Yeomanry
- Lt.-Col. Arthur Cecil Williams OBE Royal Artillery
- Maj. and Bt. Lt.-Col. Henry Benfield Des Voeux Wilkinson, late Durham Light Infantry
- Lt.-Col. and Bt. Col. John George Yule Wilson, Royal Army Service Corps
- Lt.-Col. Henry Edward Disbrowe Wise, Nottinghamshire and Derbyshire Regiment
- Col. Hastings St. Leger Wood DSO
- Lt.-Col. Arthur Stanley Woodwark CMG Royal Army Medical Corps
- Col. Ernest Granville Wright
- Col. George Wright DSO
- Temp Capt. William Burgess Wright CIE VD
- Col. Archibald Young VD
- Temp Lt.-Col. David Douglas Young
- Temp Maj. Patrick Charles Young OBE Royal Engineers

Canadian Forces

- Col. John George Adam, Canadian Army Medical Corps
- Rev. Canon John MacPherson Almond CMG Canadian Army Chaplains' Department
- Col. John Alexander Armstrong CMG Canadian Army Dental Corps
- Capt. Samuel Medbury Bosworth, Quebec Regiment
- Col. James Whiteside Bridges, Canadian Army Medical Corps
- Lt.-Col. Ernest Rudolf Brown, Canadian Army Medical Corps
- Lt.-Col. William Senkler Buell, C.E.F.
- Col. Perry Gladstone Goldsmith, Canadian Army Medical Corps
- Col. James Alexander Hutchison, Canadian Army Medical Corps
- Temp Col. Walter McKeown, Canadian Army Medical Corps
- Col. Herman Melchior Robertson, Canadian Army Medical Corps
- Lt.-Col. Charles Millidge Ruttan, Canadian Army Service Corps
- Col. Frederick St. Duthus Skinner, Reserve of Officers
- Lt.-Col. John Spottiswood Tait, British Columbia Regiment

Australian Imperial Forces

- Col. Samuel Henry Egerton Barraclough, Military Forces Staff
- Ethel Sarah Davidson RRC Matron, Australian Army Nursing Service
- Ethel Gray RRC Matron, Australian Army Nursing Service
- Rev. Albert Thomas Holden Australian Army Chaplains' Department
- Adelaide Maud Kellett RRC Matron, Australian Army Nursing Service
- Col. George Merrick Long
- Col. Reginald Jeffrey Millard CMG Australian Army Medical Corps
- Lt.-Col. George Wall CMG
- Rev. Frederick William Wray CMG Australian Army Chaplains' Department

New Zealand Forces

- Lt.-Col. Hugh Thomas Dyke Acland CMG FRCS NZ Medical Corps
- Lt.-Col. Anderson Carberry Robert Dillon FRCS NZ Medical Corps
- Col. James McNaughton Christie
- Col. Percival Robert Cooke
- Col. Charles James Cooper TD
- Maj. and Temp Lt.-Col. Thomas Henry Dawson CMG Auckland Regiment
- Lt.-Col. Alexander Robertson Falconer, NZ Medical Corps
- Lt.-Col. George Edward Gabites, NZ Medical Corps
- Lt.-Col. George Thompson Hall CMG
- Col. Ernest Haviland Hiley
- Col. John Edward Hume
- Lt.-Col. and Temp Col. James William Hutchen CMG
- Lt.-Col. John Patrick Daunt Leahy, NZ Medical Corps
- Col. Charles Thomas Maj. DSO
- Lt.-Col. Robert Haldane Makgill, NZ Medical Corps
- Temp Col. Thomas Mill CMG
- Lt.-Col. Herbert Edward Pilkington, NZ Artillery
- Col. David Pringle TD
- Col. James Robert Purdy VD
- Col. Charles John Reakes
- Col. John Ranken Reed KC
- Lt.-Col. Alexander Fowler Roberts OBE NZ Forces
- Lt.-Col. James Herbert Graham Robertson, NZ Medical Corps
- Lt.-Col. James Lewis Sleeman, NZ Forces
- Col. Edmund Robinson Smith VD
- Col. William James Strong TD
- Maj. and Temp Lt.-Col. John Studholme DSO Canterbury Mounted Rifles
- Mabel Thurston RRC Matron-in-Chief, NZ Army Nursing Service
- Col. Thomas Harcourt Ambrose Valintine
- Col. Gerard Arnold Ward
- Col. David Storer Wylie CMG

South African Forces

- Temp Lt.-Col. Charles Roscoe Burgess DSO
- Maj. and Bt. Lt.-Col. Robert Richard Edwards, Perm. Staff
- Col. Frederick Arthur Hodson, North Rhodesia Police
- Temp Maj. and Bt. Lt.-Col. James Mitchell Baker DSO Staff
- Col. Philip Graham Stock CB SA Army Medical Corps

Newfoundland Forces

- Maj. Alexander Montgomerie OBE H.Q. Staff, Newfoundland

===== Civil Division =====
British India

- George Francis Adams, Chief Inspector of Mines in India
- Eric Oswald Anderson, Member of the Council of the Lt.-Governor, Burma
- Denys de Saumarez Bray CIE Indian Civil Service, Officiating Secretary to the Government of India, Foreign! Department
- Denis Calnan, Indian Civil Service, Commissioner, Agra Division, United Provinces
- Henry Venn Cobb CSI CIE Resident in Mysore and Chief Commissioner, Coorg
- Alexander Cochran OBE Calcutta
- Adela Cottle OBE St. John Ambulance Association, Calcutta
- Frances Henrietta, Lady Craddock, Vice President, Burma Joint War Committee
- Honorary Maj. Arthur Da Vies, Honorary Superintendent, St. John's and British Red Cross Combined War Gifts Depot, Bombay
- Maharaja Ramanuj Saran Singh Deo, Feudatory Chief of Surguja State, Central Provinces
- Constance, Lady Fraser OBE Hyderabad, (Deccan)
- Lewis French CIE Indian Civil Service, Additional Secretary to the Government of the Punjab
- Hugh Kirkwood Gracey, Indian Civil Service, Commissioner, Gorakhpur Division United Provinces
- Egbert Laurie Lucas Hammond, Indian Civil Service, Controller of Munitions, Bihar and Orissa
- John Wright Henderson, Representative of the War Office in India for hides
- Edwin John Agra, United Provinces
- Jalal-ud-Daula, Nawab Muhammad Khurished
- Ali Khan, Bahadur, Mustakil-i-Jang, of Dujana, Punjab
- Maj. Sir Malik Umar Hayat Khan KCIE MVO Tiwana of Kalra, Shahpur District, Punjab
- William King-Wood, Director, Indo-European Telegraph Department, Persian Section
- Arthur Rowland Knapp, Indian Civil Service, Secretary to Government Revenue Department, Madras
- Charles Gerrans Leftwich, Indian Civil Service, Director of Civil Supplies, Central Provinces
- Francis Legge, Deputy Coal Controller, Bengal
- Harry Alexander Fanshawe Lindsay, Indian Civil Service, Director-Gen. of Commercial Intelligence in India
- Sir Leslie Creery Miller Kt Indian Civil Service (retired), Chief Judge, Mysore State
- Maharaja Bahadur Keshav Prashad Singh, of Dumraon, Bihar and Orissa
- Arthur Preston, Honorary Secretary, Indian Soldiers Fund Committee
- Lt.-Col. Cyril Powney Thompson, Indian Army, Commissioner, Multan, Punjab
- Isabel Whitehead, in charge, Furlough Recreation Camp and Convalescent Camps, Nilgiris, Madras
- George Charles Wolfe, Assistant Audit Officer, Military Supply Accounts

Commonwealth of Australia

- John Adamson, formerly Member of the Legislative Assembly, Queensland

Dominion of New Zealand

- Ethel Mary Burnett, for services in connection with the New Zealand War Contingent Association, London
- James John Clark OBE Mayor of Dunedin, for services in connection with patriotic undertakings
- Albert Cecil Day, Official Secretary to the Governor-General of New Zealand, for services to the New Zealand Government during the war
- James Henry Gunson OBE Mayor of Auckland, for services in connection with patriotic undertakings
- Henry Holland OBE Mayor of Christchurch, for services in connection with patriotic undertakings
- Ronald Macintosh MacDonald, for services in connection with the New Zealand War Contingent Association, London
- William Hugh Montgomery, for sendees as assistant director of Base Records in New Zealand
- Iris Brenda Rolleston MBE for services in organising the Taumaru Hospital (Lowry Bay) for Wounded and Convalescent Soldiers, and for voluntary services as Matron

Union of South Africa

- The Honourable Albert Browne CMG OBE ISO Joint Honorary Secretary, Governor-General's Fund
- Penelope Louise Chappe OBE President, Durban Women's Patriotic League and Red Cross
- James Stormont Dunn, Renter's Agent in South Africa
- Lt.-Col. Godfrey Archibald Godley, for services in connection with the raising of the Native Labour Corps in South Africa
- Major John Frederick Herbst, Secretary, South-West Protectorate
- Arthur Tilney Long, Union Agent, Lourenço Marques
- Deputy Commissioner William Manning, South African Police, Officer Commanding Prisoners of War Camp, Pietermaritzburg
- James Howard Pirn, chairman, Cost of Living Commission
- Lewis Richardson, for services in connection with the Governor-General's Fund and Returned Soldiers

Newfoundland

- Thomas Andrew Hall, Secretary to the Tonnage Committee and Ministry of Shipping and the Board of Coal Control
- Edward Robert Morris, Member of the Newfoundland War Contingent Association in London
- Mary Pitts, a vice-president of the Women's Patriotic Association
- Robert George Rendell OBE Chairman of the Military Service Committee
- The Honourable Marmaduke George Winter, for services in connection with the Patriotic Association and as Chairman of the Committee dealing with Waterford Hall Convalescent Home

Crown Colonies, Protectorates, Etc.

- John Ainsworth CMG DSO Chief Native Commissioner, East Africa Protectorate Alma Baker, Founder of the Malayan Aircraft Fund
- Edith Marion, Lady Bertram, President in Ceylon of Queen Mary's Needlework Guild
- Charles Edward Boyes, Deputy Resident Commissioner for Basutoland, for services in recruiting labour
- Alexander George Boyle CMG Lieutenant-Governor, and Officer Administering the Government, Nigeria
- Arthur Frederick Church, Chief Engineer of the Uganda Railway
- Arthur George Murchison Fletcher, Assistant Colonial Secretary and Clerk of Councils, and Chairman of Shipping Control Committee, Hong Kong
- Alfred Claud Hollis CMG Secretary to the Administration
- German East Africa
- Martial Louis Auguste Noël, Registrar-General, Mauritius, for services as Food Controller and Controller of Exports
- Arthur Meek Pountney, Treasurer, Straits Settlements
- The Lady Frances Ryder, for services to the Overseas Forces
- John Houston Sinclair CMG Chief Secretary to the Government, Zanzibar Protectorate
- Denis Slyne, Receiver-General and chairman of the committee for winding up alien enemies estates, Trinidad
- Winifred Marjory Stubbs, lately vice-president in Ceylon, of Queen Mary's Needlework Guild
- Marguerite Marie, Lady Wallace, for services in connection with War Funds, Northern Rhodesia

Honorary Commander

- His Highness Omar bin Mohamed, Sultan of Witu

=== Royal Red Cross (RRC) ===
==== First Class ====
- Christina Cameron, Queen Alexandra's Imperial Military Nursing Service (Q.A.I.M.N.S) Reserve, Matron, Royal Air Force Nursing Service, Matlock
- Lorna Margaret Holroyde, Matron, Royal Air Force Auxiliary Hospital, Eaton Square, London

In recognition of valuable services-with the British Forces in the Balkans —

- Winifred Alice Attenborough ARRC Asst. Matron, Territorial Force Nursing Service (T.F.N.S.)
- Eva Catherine Ellis ARRC Asst. Matron, Q.A.I.M.N.S.R.
- Amy Louise Fielding, Acting Matron, Q.A.I.M.N.S.
- Mary Elizabeth Mee, Acting Asst. Matron, T.F.N.S.
- Sara Helen Mitchell, Acting Matron, T.F.N.S.
- Maud Helena Weale, Matron, T.F.N.S.

Australian Army Nursing Service

- Christense Sorensen ARRC Sister, Temp Matron
- Evelyn Clara Louisa Wilson, Sister, Temp Head Sister

In recognition of valuable services with the British Forces in Egypt —

- Johanna McCarthy ARRC Sister, Q.A.I.M.N.S.R.
- Nannie Stewart, Sister, Q.A.I.M.N.S.R.
- Emilie Elizabeth Wraxall ARRC Sister, Q.A.I.M.N.S.R.

Australian Army Nursing Service

- Jessie Ross Gemmel, Matron

In recognition of valuable services with the Armies in France and Flanders —

- Gertrude Alice Aitchison, Sister, Q.A.I.M.N.S. (Ret.)
- Mary Ashlin-Thomas ARRC Matron, British Red Cross Society
- Pauline Barnard ARRC Sister, T.F.N.S.
- Marian Sabine Barwell ARRC Acting Matron, Civilian Hospital, Special Reserve
- Frances May Billington ARRC Acting Sister, Q.A.I.M.N.S.R.
- Mary Agnes Crawford Blair ARRC Acting Sister, Q.A.I.M.N.S.R.
- Maude Brasier ARRC Matron, B.R.C.S.
- Katherine Maud Bulman ARRC Sister, Q.A.I.M.N.S. (Ret.)
- Gertrude Mary Bulman ARRC Sister in Charge, T.F.N.S.
- Bessie Carley ARRC Asst. Matron, T.F.N.S.
- Rosylyn Mary Carr ARRC Matron, B.R.C.S.
- Annie Eleanor Casserley ARRC Acting Sister, Civilian Hospital, Special Reserve
- Elsie Violet Cassidy ARRC Acting Sister, Civilian Hospital, Special Reserve
- Grace Hardyman Caulfield ARRC Acting Matron, Q.A.I.M.N.S.
- Kate Eliza Jane Chapman, Sister in Charge, Q.A.I.M.N.S.R.
- Mabel Adeline Chittock MM Asst. Matron, St. John's Ambulance Brigade
- Susannah Frances Davies ARRC Asst. Matron, Q.A.I.M.N.S.
- Ethel Isabella Devenish-Meares MM Acting Matron, Q.A.I.M.N.S.R.
- Emma Dodd ARRC Sister, T.F.N.S.
- Annie Duncan ARRC Sister, Civilian Hospital, Special Reserve
- Annie Harriett Esden ARRC Asst. Matron, Q.A.I.M.N.S.
- Helen Mary Fergusson ARRC Sister, T.F.N.S.
- Jessica Lillington Freshfield ARRC Charge Sister, B.R.C.S.
- Elsie Vera Orby Gascoigne ARRC Acting Sister, Civilian Hospital, Special Reserve
- Mabel Emily Gascoine ARRC Acting Sister, Civilian Hospital, Special Reserve
- Annice Gray ARRC Acting Sister, Q.A.I.M.N.S.R.
- Gladys Augusta Howe ARRC Acting Matron, Q.A.I.M.N.S.
- Mercy Huffer ARRC Acting Sister, Civilian Hospital, Special Reserve
- Mabel Jennings ARRC MM Sister-in Charge, T.F.N.S.
- Margaret Jane Jessop, Acting Sister, Civilian Hospital, Special Reserve
- Nelly Ida Jordan ARRC Asst. Matron, Q.A.I.M.N.S.
- Marion Leppard ARRC Acting Sister. Civilian Hospital, Special Reserve
- Janet McFarlane Livingstone ARRC Sister, Q.A.I.M.N.S.
- Edith Maud Lyle ARRC Sister, Asst. Matron, T.F.N.S.
- Marion McCormick ARRC Sister, Q.A.I.M.N.S.
- Maude Alice Meeke ARRC Sister, Q.A.I.M.N.S.R.
- Martha. Reid-Morrison ARRC Sister, T.F.N.S.
- Kathleen Aloysius O'Reilly ARRC Sister, Q.A.I.M.N.S.R.
- Jane Jessie Arthur Paul ARRC Sister, Q.A.I.M.N.S.R.
- Edith Rose Pilson, Sister, T.F.N.S.
- Mary Pool ARRC Sister-in Charge, T.F.N.S.
- Margaret Scott Ram, Matron, Q.A.I.M.N.S.
- Jessie Anderson Robertson, Acting Sister, Civilian Hospital, Special Reserve
- Christine Sandbach ARRC Sister, Q.A.I.M.N.S.
- Elizabeth Scott-Newton ARRC Sister, Civilian Hospital, Special Reserve
- Erne Robertson Sloan ARRC Sister in Charge, T.F.N.S.
- Agnes Martha Brownlie Taylor ARRC Acting Sister, Civilian Hospital, Special Reserve
- Lilian Mary Terrill ARRC Sister, Q.A.I.M.N.S.R.
- Jane Elizabeth Trotter ARRC Acting Sister, Q.A.I.M.N.S.R.
- Elizabeth Annie Williams, Acting Sister, Q.A.I.M.N.S.R.
- Annie Paterson Wilson ARRC Asst. Matron, Q.A.I.M.N.S.
- Agnes Wyllie, Sister, Q.A.I.M.N.S.R.

Canadian Army Medical Corps

- Sophia Mary Hoerner ARRC Nursing Sister
- Sarah Persis Johnson ARRC Nursing Sister
- Amy Emma MacMahon, Nursing Sister
- Helen Lydia McIntosh, Nursing Sister
- Emma Florence Pense ARRC Acting Matron
- Lucy Gertrude Squire ARRC Acting Matron
- Flora Harriet Wylie ARRC Nursing Sister

Australian Army Nursing Service

- Nellie Frances Hill, Sister
- Eleanor Wibmer Jeffries ARRC Head Sister
- Constance Mabel Keys ARRC Head Sister
- Alice Joan Twynam, Head Sister

New Zealand Army Nursing Service

- Blanche Marion Huddleston ARRC Sister

In recognition of valuable services with the British Forces in Italy —

- Mary Cockshott ARRC Sister T.F.N.S.
- Kathleen Mary Latham ARRC Sister Q.A.I.M.N.S.R.
- Mary Elizabeth Stewart ARRC Matron, Q.A.I.M.N.S.

In recognition of valuable services with the British Forces in Mesopotamia —

- Mary Meredith Bate ARRC Asst. Matron, T.F.N.S.
- Annie Constance Brumwell, Sister, Q.A.I.M.N.S.R.
- Georgina Burke-Rioche ARRC Matron, attd. Queen Alexandra's Medical Nursing Service India
- Elizabeth Cooke, Sister, Q.A.I.M.N.S.R.
- Dorothy Adeline Creed ARRC Sister, Q.A.I.M.N.S.R.
- Isobel Hay Drummond, Sister, Q.A.I.M.N.S.R.
- Sophia Louisa Hatton ARRC Sister, T.F.N.S.
- Esther Isaac ARRC Sister, Q.A.I.M.N.S.R.
- Annie Leech ARRC Sister, T.F.N.S.
- Edith Osborne Marshall ARRC Nursing Sister, Queen Alexandra's Medical Nursing Service India
- Netta Louisa Sibley ARRC Sister, Q.A.I.M.N.S.R.
- Ethel Smithies, Sister, Q.A.I.M.N.S.R.
- Magdalene Forbes Valentine, Sister, Q.A.I.M.N.S.R.
- Dorothea West ARRC Nursing Sister, Queen Alexandra's Medical Nursing Service India

In recognition of valuable services with the British Forces in East Africa —

- Elizabeth Letita Kemsley ARRC Acting Matron, East African Nursing Service
- Mary MacDevitt ARRC Nursing Sister, Q.A.I.M.N.S.R.
- Florence Spindler, Matron, Nyasaland Medical Services

==== Second Class ====
In recognition of valuable nursing services in connection with the War —

- Annie Elizabeth Betts, Sister, Q.A.I.M.N.S.R. Military Hospital, Gibraltar
- J. Edgar, Nurse-in-Charge, Convalescent Hospital, Waterford Bridge, Newfoundland
- E. Reid, Nurse-in-Charge, Military Hospital St. John's, Newfoundland

In recognition of valuable services-with the British Forces in the Balkans —

- Naomi Mildred Buckley, Sister, Q.A.I.M.N.S.R.
- Annie Cameron, Staff Nurse, T.F.N.S.
- Annie Clarke, Sister, Q.A.I.M.N.S.R.
- Annora Cole, Staff Nurse, T.F.N.S.
- Margaret Louise Dixon, Staff Nurse, Q.A.I.M.N.S.R.
- Claudine Josephine Rose Douglas, Voluntary Aid Detachment
- Mary Drury, Sister, T.F.N.S.
- Irene Annie Duncan, Nurse, Spec. War Probationer
- Ada Ellen Amelia Foreman, Sister, Q.A.I.M.N.S.R.
- Gertrude Fozard, Staff Nurse, Q.A.I.M.N.S.R.
- Margaret Hunter Gammie, Sister, T.F.N.S.
- Helen. Gillespie, Sister, Q.A.I.M.N.S.R.
- Nellie Barrowman Hutchison, Sister, Q.A.I.M.N.S.R.
- Mary Maud Lilian Johns, Sister, Q.A.I.M.N.S.R.
- Agnes Maguire, Staff Nurse, Q.A.I.M.N.S.R.
- Elizabeth McVeigh, Staff Nurse, Q.A.I.M.N.S.R.
- Annie Elizabeth Moffat, Sister, T.F.N.S.
- Elizabeth Moore, Staff Nurse, Q.A.I.M.N.S.R.
- Ada Isabel Murray, Sister, Q.A.I.M.N.S.R.
- Harriett Powell-Evans, Sister, T.F.N.S.
- Dora May Sempers, Sister, T.F.N.S.
- Emily Simpson Shewan, Staff Nurse, T.F.N.S.
- Kezia. Edith Stacey, Sister, Q.A.I.M.N.S.R.
- Amelia Stevenson, Sister, T.F.N.S.
- Annie Parker Thomson, Sister, Asst. Matron, T.F.N.S.
- Mary Upton, Sister, T.F.N.S.
- Evelyn Annie Williams, Sister, T.F.N.S.
- Emmie Winkle, Sister, Q.A.I.M.N.S.R.

Australian Army Nursing Service

- Ethel May Bolton, Sister, Temp Head Sister
- Jean Brydon, Sister

In recognition of valuable services with the British Forces in Egypt —

- Isobel Huntly Anderson, Sister, T.F.N.S.
- Edith Lydia Arber, Sister, T.F.N.S.
- Jane McLean Arnold, Sister, Q.A.I.M.N.S.R.
- Gertrude Kate Berry, Sister, Q.A.I.M.N.S.R.
- Agnes Broiwn, Sister, T.F.N.S.
- Mary Graham Brownlee, Sister, T.F.N.S.
- Elsie May Chiplin, Staff Nurse, T.F.N.S.
- Florence Annie Cleve, Sister, Q.A.I.M.N.S.R.
- Kathrene Ada Cole, Voluntary Aid Detachment, B.R.C.S.
- Kathleen Lydia Conway, Sister, Q.A.I.M.N.S.R.
- Christiana Dimmock, Sister, Q.A.I.M.N.S.R.
- Fanny Eggington, Sister, T.F.N.S.
- Alexa Ensor, Nurse, St. John's Ambulance Association
- Elizabeth Forrester Farquhar, Staff Nurse, Q.A.I.M.N.S.R.
- Euphemia Forrest, Sister, Q.A.I.M.N.S.R.
- Alice Mary Funnell, Sister, Q.A.I.M.N.S.R.
- Grace Gilfillan, Sister, Q.A.I.M.N.S.R.
- Edith Athena Hancock, Sister, Q.A.I.M.N.S.R.
- Mary Josephine Anna Hannan, Sister, Q.A.I.M.N.S.R.
- Dorothy Hardwick, Voluntary Aid Detachment, B.R.C.S.
- Jessie Harvey, Staff Nurse, T.F.N.S.
- Alice Anne Heathcote, Staff Nurse, Q.A.I.M.N.S.R.
- Alice Mary Hedges, Sister, Q.A.I.M.N.S.R.
- Frances Lily Hoon, Sister, Q.A.I.M.N.S.R.
- Grace Margaret Hooper, Sister, Q.A.I.M.N.S.R.
- Elizabeth Grace Hutton, Sister, Q.A.I.M.N.S.R.
- Dorothy Frances Jacob, Staff Nurse, Q.A.I.M.N.S.R.
- Florence Caroline Jman, Staff Nurse, Q.A.I.M.N.S.R.
- Flora MacDiarmid, Sister, Q.A.I.M.N.S.R.
- Eliza MacDonald, Staff Nurse, Voluntary Aid Detachment
- Emily Eliza Manser, Sister, Q.A.I.M.N.S.R.
- Edith Marshall, Sister, Q.A.I.M.N.S.R.
- Ethel Mary Maxwell, Nurse, St. John's Ambulance Association
- Jessie Stewart McGaw, Sister, Q.A.I.M.N.S.R.
- Elizabeth Mellor, Sister, Q.A.I.M.N.S.R.
- Irene Maud Mary Moir, Sister, T.F.N.S.
- Mary Murphy, Staff Nurse, Q.A.I.M.N.S.R.
- Ada Alice Newsham, Sister, Q.A.I.M.N.S.R.
- Honoria O'Sullivan, Staff Nurse, T.F.N.S.
- Mary Patterson, Sister, Q.A.I.M.N.S.R.
- Isobel Pirie, Temp Nurse, attd. Q.A.I.M.N.S.R.
- Christina Reid, Sister, Q.A.I.M.N.S.R.
- Evelyn Maud Reid, Sister, Q.A.I.M.N.S.R.
- Marguerite Georgia Rundle, Voluntary Aid Detachment, B.R.C.S.
- Pauline Schor, Sister, Q.A.I.M.N.S.R.
- Gladys Alma Seeley, Sister, Q.A.I.M.N.S.R.
- Sarah Anne Shorrock, Voluntary Aid Detachment, St. John's Ambulance Brigade
- Augusta Mary Elizabeth Somers, Sister, Q.A.I.M.N.S.R.
- Ida Florence Welch, Sister, T.F.N.S.
- Eliza Wilcock, Sister, Q.A.I.M.N.S.R.
- Edith Mary Williams, Sister, Q.A.I.M.N.S.R.
- Norah Mary Willies, Sister, Q.A.I.M.N.S.R.
- Ellen Rachel Willings, Sister, Q.A.I.M.N.S.R.

Australian Army Nursing Service

- Agnes Grace Bonnar, Sister
- Isabella Tait Berwick, Temp Sister
- Elsie May Cooke, Sister
- Katherine Minnie Donaldson, Sister
- Ellen Ethel Jean Hedderman, Staff Nurse
- Eileen Isabel Hutton, Staff Nurse
- Maggie Jones, Sister
- Nano Nagle, Temp Sister
- Elizabeth Jane White, Sister

In recognition of valuable services with the Armies in France and Flanders —

- Agnes Mary A'Hern, Sister, Q.A.I.M.N.S.
- Martha Aitkin, Sister, T.F.N.S.
- Lilian Allen, Nurse, Voluntary Aid Detachment
- Mary Dorothy Allen, Acting Sister, Q.A.I.M.N.S.R.
- Katharine Amelia Allsop, Sister, Q.A.I.M.N.S.
- Theodora Frances Almack, Nurse, Voluntary Aid Detachment, B.R.C.S.
- Margaret Rita Arnold, Acting Sister, Civilian Hospital, Special Reserve
- Edith Arnott, Nurse, Voluntary Aid Detachment
- Edith Gwenllian Austin, Acting Sister, Q.A.I.M.N.S.R.
- Mildred Isabel Austin, Sister, T.F.N.S.
- Amelia Ayre, Acting Matron, Q.A.I.M.N.S.
- Margaret Dow Bain, Sister, T.F.N.S.
- Margaret Hendeboorcke Ballance MM Sister, St. John's Ambulance Brigade
- Mary Kathleen Barclay, Sister, Q.A.I.M.N.S.
- Kathleen Barrett, Asst. Nurse, Voluntary Aid Detachment
- Mabel Katie Barr-Stevens, Voluntary Aid Detachment Nurse, B.R.C.S.
- Grizel Gillespie Bayley, Nurse, Voluntary Aid Detachment
- Helen Margaret Bennett, Sister, B.R.C.S.
- Aline Quiddington Blades, Acting Sister, Civilian Hospital, Special Reserve
- Margaret Janette Blake, Nurse, Voluntary Aid Detachment
- Olive Sibella Bonham-Carter, Asst. Nurse, Voluntary Aid Detachment
- Mary Cawston Bousfield, Asst. Nurse, Voluntary Aid Detachment
- Eliza Annie Bradshaw, Sister, T.F.N.S.
- Margaret Gwladys JBraithwaite, Asst. Nurse, Voluntary Aid Detachment
- Beatrice Alice Brayshaw, Sister, T.F.N.S.
- Mildred Breeze, Acting Sister, Q.A.I.M.N.S.R.
- Margaret Ethel Briggs, Sister, T.F.N.S.
- Janet Sinclair Bruce Brotchie, Staff Nurse, Civilian Hospital, Special Reserve
- Margaret Crichton Brown, Staff Nurse, Q.A.I.M.N.S.R.
- Helen Grace Brownrigg, Asst. Nurse, Voluntary Aid Detachment
- Marjory Mitchell Bruce, Sister, Q.A.I.M.N.S.R.
- Ida Doris Bull, Nurse, Voluntary Aid Detachment, St. John Ambulance Association
- Ailsa Noel Hurford Bullough, Nurse, Voluntary Aid Detachment
- Caroline Muriel Bulteel, Sister, T.F.N.S.
- Eileen Mary Byrne, Acting Sister, Civilian Hospital, Special Reserve
- Annie MacMillan Caldwell, Nurse, Voluntary Aid Detachment
- Mabel Copeland Capper
- Lucy Kate Card, Nurse, Voluntary Aid Detachment
- Rose Carter Shaw Carleton, Sister, Q.A.I.M.N.S.
- Kate Carruthers MM Sister, T.F.N.S.
- Hilda Clarkson, Nurse, Spec. Med. Probationer, T.F.N.S.
- Caroline Mary Clements, Sister, Q.A.I.M.N.S.R.
- Violet Collett, Nurse, Voluntary Aid Detachment, St. John's Ambulance Brigade
- Eva Colvin, Nurse, Voluntary Aid Detachment
- Edith Elizabeth Cooke, Sister, Civilian Hospital, Special Reserve
- Katie Charlotte Cooper, Sister, T.F.N.S.
- Cicely Gladys Cope-Morgan, Nurse, Voluntary Aid Detachment
- May Susan Corsellis, Asst. Nurse, Voluntary Aid Detachment
- Susanna. Coulter, Sister, Civilian Hospital, Special Reserve
- Florence Cowper, Nurse, Voluntary Aid Detachment
- Mary Ann Cracknell, Sister, Asst. Matron, T.F.N.S.
- Margaret Wilson Craig, Nurse, Voluntary Aid Detachment
- Dorothea Mary Lynette Crewdson MM Nurse, Voluntary Aid Detachment
- Edith Winifred Croft, Acting Sister, Q.A.I.M.N.S.
- The Hon Dorothy Mary Cross, Asst. Nurse, Voluntary Aid Detachment
- The Hon Georgina Marjorie Cross, Asst. Nurse, Voluntary Aid Detachment
- Nora Cullen, Asst. Nurse, Voluntary Aid Detachment
- Mary Maitland Cunningham, Sister, T.F.N.S.
- Edith Denison, Sister, T.F.N.S.
- Norah Creina Denny, Nurse, Spec. Med. Probationer, attd. Q.A.I.M.N.S.
- Amelia Victoria Derry, Sister, T.F.N.S.
- Dorothy Mary Dodson, Sister, B.R.C.S.
- Zoe Blanche Douet, Sister, T.F.N.S.
- Estelle Mary Doyle, Sister, Q.A.I.M.N.S.R.
- Edith Maud Drummond-Hay, Nurse, Voluntary Aid Detachment
- Helen Sinclair Ellis, Nurse, Voluntary Aid Detachment
- Frances Georgina Fegan, Staff Nurse, T.F.N.S.
- Ellen Fewlass, Acting Sister, Q.A.I.M.N.S.R.
- Elizabeth Young Fleming, Sister, T.F.N.S.
- Millie Float, Asst. Nurse, Voluntary Aid Detachment
- Eliza Anneta Forrest, Staff Nurse, Q.A.I.M.N.S.R.
- Catharine Forrestal, Asst. Nurse, Voluntary Aid Detachment
- Elizabeth Fowler, Sister, Q.A.I.M.N.S.R.
- Jessie Fraser, Sister, T.F.N.S.
- Gladys Maud Gardiner, Nurse, Voluntary Aid Detachment
- Elsie Garner, Acting Sister, Civilian Hospital, Special Reserve
- Elizabeth Gibson, Acting Sister, Q.A.I.M.N.S.
- Elsie Mabel Gladstone, Acting Sister, Civilian Hospital, Special Reserve
- Margaret Anne Gray, Sister, B.R.C.S.
- Margaret Greatorex, Nurse, Voluntary Aid Detachment
- Olive Greenwell, Nurse, Spec. Med. Probationer, T.F.N.S.
- Louise Griffiths, Sister, B.R.C.S.
- Betty Georgina Hacker, Acting Sister, Civilian Hospital, Special Reserve
- Sarah Hands, Sister, T.F.N.S.
- Mary Kathleen Harding, Nurse, Voluntary Aid Detachment, St. John's Ambulance Brigade
- Nellie Hayes, Sister, T.F.N.S.
- Isabel Stephen Henderson, Staff Nurse, Q.A.I.M.N.S.R.
- Jean Wyper Fergus Henderson, Sister, T.F.N.S.
- Marian Hissey, Acting Sister, Civilian Hospital, Special Reserve
- Annie Elizabeth Hobday, Sister, T.F.N.S.
- Mary Bridget Hogan, Staff Nurse, Q.A.I.M.N.S.R.
- Hilda Hollings, Nurse, Voluntary Aid Detachment
- Harriet Rhoda Howard, Sister, Q.A.I.M.N.S.R.
- Margaret Alice Howe, Staff Nurse, T.F.N.S.
- Gertrude Harriette Howell-Evans, Asst. Nurse, Voluntary Aid Detachment
- Alice Emily Howship, Nurse, Voluntary Aid Detachment
- Edith Isaac, Nurse, Voluntary Aid Detachment
- Cicely Mary Jackson, Nurse, Voluntary Aid Detachment, St. John's Ambulance Brigade
- Ethel Webb Johnson, Acting Sister, Q.A.I.M.N.S.R.
- Sarah Evelyn Johnson MM Acting Sister, Civilian Hospital, Special Reserve
- Lyelee Johnstone, Sister, Q.A.I.M.N.S.R.
- Evaline Sarah Jones, Acting Sister, Q.A.I.M.N.S.R.
- Annie Day Kearney, Nurse, Voluntary Aid Detachment
- Jane Pauline Kelsey, Acting Sister, Civilian Hospital, Special Reserve
- Ida Maud Kenshole, Asst. Nurse, Voluntary Aid Detachment
- Alice May Keyser, Nurse, Voluntary Aid Detachment
- Teresa King, Sister, St. John's Ambulance Brigade
- Evelyn Kinnear, Acting Sister, Q.A.I.M.N.S.R.
- Dorothy Maud Knights, Sister, Civilian Hospital, Special Reserve
- Mary Lavie, Asst. Nurse, Spec. War Probationer, attd. Q.A.I.M.N.S.
- Dorthy Grace Lawson, Nurse, Voluntary Aid Detachment, B.R.C.S.
- Ida Blanche Leedam, Sister, Civilian Hospital, Special Reserve
- The Lady Rosemary Leveson-Gower (now The Viscountess Ednam), Nurse, Voluntary Aid Detachment
- Elizabeth Ethel Lewis, Nurse, Voluntary Aid Detachment
- Mary Jeffrey Liddeil, Staff Nurse, T.F.N.S.
- Margaret Russell Lillie, Sister, T.F.N.S.
- The Hon Edith Modwena Littleton, Asst. Nurse, Spec. Med. Probationer, attd. Q.A.I.M.N.S.
- Mabel Jane Lloyd, Staff Nurse, T.F.N.S.
- Edith Gladys Lunn, Nurse, Voluntary Aid Detachment
- Rowena Jeans Lush, Sister, T.F.N.S.
- Hermione Lyttleton, Nurse, Spec. Med
- Probationer, attd. Q.A.I.M.N.S.
- Annie Ellis MacAndrew, Acting Sister, Q.A.I.M.N.S.R.
- Mary Clark Macfarlane, Nurse, Voluntary Aid Detachment
- Jeannie Macleod, Sister, T.F.N.S.
- Ruth Beatrice Manning, Nurse, Voluntary Aid Detachment
- Mary Stewart Marrow
- Daisy Maud Martin, Sister, Q.A.I.M.N.S.
- Catherine McIntyre Matheson, Sister, T.F.N.S.
- Aoine Mathieson, Acting Sister, Q.A.I.M.N.S.R.
- Margaret McCowan, Voluntary Aid Detachment, Nurse, B.R.C.S.
- Helen Wightman McDonald, Nurse, Voluntary Aid Detachment
- Harriet McIlwain, Staff Nurse, Q.A.I.M.N.S.R.
- Kathleen McLean, Sister, Q.A.I.M.N.S.R.
- Christina McDonald McLennan, Sister, Q.A.I.M.N.S.R.
- Mary Metcalf, Nurse, Voluntary Aid Detachment
- Charlotte Forbes Middleton, Acting Sister Q.A.I.M.N.S.R.
- Jessie Miller, Sister, B.R.C.S.
- Elsie Mollett, Asst. Nurse, Voluntary Aid Detachment
- Mary Beatrice Molloy, Sister, B.R.C.S.
- Norah Molloy, Asst. Matron, Q.A.I.M.N.S.
- Margaret Glencorse Montgomery, Nurse, Voluntary Aid Detachment
- Clare Mary Morrin, Acting Sister, Civilian Hospital, Special Reserve
- Gertrude Charlotte Muriel Morris, Nurse, Voluntary Aid Detachment, St. John's Ambulance Association
- Jessie Alexander Morty, Sister, Q.A.I.M.N.S.R.
- Faith Moulson, Acting Sister, Q.A.I.M.N.S.R.
- Amy Laurie Neale, Nurse, Voluntary Aid Detachment, B.R.C.S.
- Bernadette Leah Nelligan, Sister, B.R.C.S.
- Annie Thomson Nicoll, Staff Nurse, Civilian Hospital, Special Reserve
- Sarah Frances Norfield, Sister, B.R.C.S.
- Leah Northwood, Staff Nurse, T.F.N.S.
- Janet Balderston Campbell Orchardson, T.F.N.S.
- Sheila O'Riordan, Staff Nurse, Q.A.I.M.N.S.R.
- Cecile Parke, Nurse, Spec. Med. Probationer, attd. Q.A.I.M.N.S.
- Edith Irene Pastfield, Sister, T.F.N.S.
- Elizabeth Mary Patrickson, Sister, T.F.N.S.
- Dorothy Ann Pexkin, Nurse, Voluntary Aid Detachment
- Alice Mary Phillips, Sister, B.R.C.S.
- Marian August Sybella Pidcock-Henzell, Nurse, Voluntary Aid Detachment
- Evelyn Mary Pike, Acting Sister, Q.A.I.M.N.S.R.
- Evelyn Janet Pinkerton, Asst. Nurse, Voluntary Aid Detachment
- Mise Hilda Mary Purse, Sister, T.F.N.S.
- Emily Raven, Acting Sister, Civil Hospital Res
- Adeline Reburn, Acting Sister, Civilian Hospital, Special Reserve
- Alice Amy Algar Rennison, Acting Sister, Civilian Hospital, Special Reserve
- Alice Maud Reynolds, Sister, B.R.C.S.
- Elizabeth Riach, Acting Sister, Civilian Hospital, Special Reserve
- Dorothy May Ridley, Nurse, Voluntary Aid Detachment
- Violet Riley, Acting Sister, Civilian Hospital, Special Reserve
- Charlotte Roberts, Nurse, Voluntary Aid Detachment
- Kathleen Roberts, Nurse, Voluntary Aid Detachment
- Margaret Myllim Roberts, Sister, Q.A.I.M.N.S.
- Ada Hushforth, Sister, Civilian Hospital, Special Reserve
- Amelia Kelmar St. Leger, Acting Matron, Q.A.I.M.N.S.R.
- Hilda Maud Sandys, Nurse, Voluntary Aid Detachment
- Annie Leila Sartain, Staff Nurse, Civilian Hospital, Special Reserve
- Mabel Schotburgh, Staff Nurse, T.F.N.S.
- Louise Mary Scott-Bamford, Nurse, Spec. Med. Probationer, attd. Q.A.I.M.N.S.
- Dorothy Nina Seymour, Voluntary Aid Detachment, B.R.C.S.
- Florence Nightingale Shore, Acting Sister, Q.A.I.M.N.S.R.
- Rebecca Alice Shorten, Acting Sister, Q.A.I.M.N.S.R.
- Jeanie Winchester Simon, Acting Sister, Q.A.I.M.N.S.R.
- Bridget Mary Slevin, Sister, St. John's Ambulance Brigade
- Elizabeth Slingsby, Acting Sister, Civilian Hospital, Special Reserve
- Annie Sarah Sly, Sister, T.F.N.S.
- Mary Patullo Stout, Nurse, Voluntary Aid Detachment
- Sybil Mary Stratton, Asst. Nurse, Voluntary Aid Detachment
- Marian Streatfield, Nurse, Voluntary Aid Detachment, B.R.C.S.
- Dorothea Mary Gladys Sutherland, Nurse, Voluntary Aid Detachment
- Lillian Charlotte Suttor, Staff Nurse, Q.A.I.M.N.S.R.
- Mary Maud Isabel Thomas, Nurse, Voluntary Aid Detachment
- Ella Margaret Usherwood, Sister, Q.A.I.M.N.S.R.
- Christian Valentine, Acting Sister, Q.A.I.M.N.S.R.
- Robina Warden, Sister, B.R.C.S.
- Agnes Helen Warner, Nurse, Voluntary Aid Detachment
- Rebecca Tringham Watson, Sister, T.F.N.S.
- Ruth Millicent Watson, Nurse, Spec. Med. Probationer, attd. Q.A.I.M.N.S.
- Amelia Allan Watt, Nurse, Voluntary Aid Detachment
- Isabella Webster, Acting Sister, Q.A.I.M.N.S.R.
- Daisy Constance Wells, Acting Sister, Civilian Hospital, Special Reserve
- Florence Rose Wells, Staff Nurse, Q.A.I.M.N.S.R.
- Ethel Minnie White, Nurse, Voluntary Aid Detachment, St. John's Ambulance Brigade
- Lilian Eliza White, Staff Nurse, Q.A.I.M.N.S.R.
- Jean Strachan Whyte MM Sister, T.F.N.S.
- Annie Maud Williams, Nurse, Voluntary Aid Detachment
- Hannah Wilson, Sister, T.F.N.S.
- Margaret Wilson, Nurse, Voluntary Aid Detachment
- Margaret Hannah Wilson, Sister, B.R.C.S.
- Shirley Alice Wilson, Sister, T.F.N.S.
- Dorothy Winder, Nurse, Voluntary Aid Detachment
- Grace Vanstone Winter, Acting Sister, Q.A.I.M.N.S.R.
- Lucy Elizabeth Wood, Nurse, Voluntary Aid Detachment
- Rose Dorothea Wood, Nurse, Voluntary Aid Detachment
- Madge Woodhouse, Asst. Nurse, Voluntary Aid Detachment
- Ernestine Wray, Acting Sister, Q.A.I.M.N.S.R.
- Alice Wright, Sister, T.F.N.S.
- Emily Wright, Acting Sister, Q.A.I.M.N.S.R.
- Kate Sutherland Wright, Acting Sister, Civilian Hospital, Special Reserve
- Nora Ramscar Wright, Nurse, Voluntary Aid Detachment
- Eva Mary Ingram Yelf, Sister, T.F.N.S.
- Sarah Neale Youngman, Staff Nurse, T.F.N.S.

Canadian Army Medical Corps

- Sarah Ann Archard, Nursing Sister
- Christiarma Pauline Arnold, Nursing Sister
- Katharine Elizabeth Barden, Nursing Sister
- Leila Brady, Nursing Sister
- Evadne Kilgour Cotter, Nursing Sister
- Gertrude Catherine Cresswell, Nursing Sister
- Evangeline Lydia Emsley, Nursing Sister
- Mies Mary Evelyn Engelke, Nursing Sister
- Annabel Jane Fraser, Nursing Sister
- Jessie Margaret Gent, Nursing Sister
- Gertrude Ellinor Halpenny, Nursing Sister
- Alice Eva Hindley, Nursing Sister
- Margaret Johnston, Nursing Sister
- Margaret Leamy, Nursing Sister
- Carolyn June Little, Nursing Sister
- Katharine Anna MacLeod, Nursing Sister
- Mary Aleda MacNaughton, Nursing Sister
- Mary McPherson, Nursing Sister
- Rachel McConnell, Nursing Sister
- Louise Stanton McGreer, Nursing Sister
- Minnie MacInnes, Nursing Sister
- Myrtle MacMillan, Nursing Sister
- Harriet Tremaine Meiklejohn, Nursing Sister
- Minnie Ethel Misner, Nursing Sister
- Emma Grace Moore, Nursing Sister
- Eva Lillian Morkill, Nursing Sister
- Isabel Baird Forbes Muir, Nursing Sister
- Elsie Sara Nicholson, Nursing Sister
- Kathleen Panton, Nursing Sister
- Marion Ethel Price, Nursing Sister
- Ethel Gertrude Saunders, Nursing Sister
- Alice Mary Stewart, Nursing Sister
- Mary Catherine Stewart, Nursing Sister
- Agnes Sutherland, Nursing Sister
- Annette Maud Tate, Nursing Sister
- Ada Amelia Taylor, Nursing Sister
- Alice Gertrude Turner, Nursing Sister
- Marjorie Mabel Webb, Nursing Sister
- Margaret Jane Woods, Nursing Sister
- Helen Janet Woolson, Nursing Sister

Australian Army Nursing Service

- Ellen Bennett Brown, Sister
- Ethel Maud Dement, Sister
- Erne May Garden, Sister
- Beatrice Mary Gibbings, Sister
- Esther Hart, Sister
- Amy King, Sister
- Elma Mary Linklater, Sister
- Missi Katharine Lawrence Porter, Sister
- Louisa Snelling, Sister
- Valerie Henrietta Ziohy Woinarski, Head Sister

New Zealand Army Nursing Service

- Margaret Gebrgina Davies, Sister

South African Military Nursing Service

- Mary Hamilton Campbell, Nursing Sister
- Alice Beryl Conyngham, Nursing Sister
- Bessie Wagstaff, Staff Nurse, SA Medical Nursing Service, attd. Q.A.I.M.N.S.R.

In recognition of valuable services with the British Forces in Italy —

- Jane Crawford, Staff, Nurse, Q.A.I.M.N.S.R.
- Marjory Winton Isabel Heaton-Ellis, Voluntary Aid Detachment Asst. Nurse, St. John's Ambulance Brigade
- Laura Elizabeth James MM Acting Matron, Q.A.I.M.N.S.
- Betty Powell-Jenkins, Sister, T.F.N.S.

Australian Army Nursing Service

- Evelyn Victoria Hutt, Sister

In recognition of valuable services with the British Forces in Mesopotamia

- Elizabeth Grace Adams, Staff Nurse, Q.A.I.M.N.S.R.
- Grace Boshell, Staff Nurse, Q.A.I.M.N.S.R.
- Marian Frances Bradshaw, Sister, Q.A.I.M.N.S.R.
- Ethel Isabel Brookes, Temp Nurse, attd. Queen Alexandra's Medical Nursing Service India
- Minnie Butter, Sister, T.F.N.S.
- Elizabeth Mary Carlton, Staff Nurse, Q.A.I.M.N.S.R.
- Ethel Winifred Dearie, Sister, Q.A.I.M.N.S.R.
- Ellen Disney, Staff Nurse, Q.A.I.M.N.S.R.
- Winifred Mabel. Edward-Jones, Temp Nurse, attd. Queen Alexandra's Medical Nursing Service India
- Muriel Gwendoline Etchell, Staff Nurse Q.A.I.M.N.S.R.
- Isobel Muriel Guthrie, Temp Nurse, attd. Queen Alexandra's Medical Nursing Service India
- Jenny Hermon, Temp Nurse, attd. Q.A.I.M.N.S.R.
- Grace Bertha Kruger, Temp Nurse, attd. Queen Alexandra's Medical Nursing Service India
- Lizzie May, Sister, Q.A.I.M.N.S.R.
- Anna Patricia Meaney, Sister, Queen Alexandra's Medical Nursing Service India
- Minnie Vincent Levey, Sister, Q.A.I.M.N.S.R.
- Kathleen Elizabeth Leyden, Temp Nurse, attd. Queen Alexandra's Medical Nursing Service India
- Helen MacHardy, Staff Nurse, Q.A.I.M.N.S.R.
- Annie Margaret Macintosh, Sister, Q.A.I.M.N.S.R.
- Norah Callwell Packenham-Walsh, Staff Nurse, Q.A.I.M.N.S.R.
- Christine Sinclair, Sister, Q.A.I.M.N.S.R.
- Mary Catherine Trower, Sister, Q.A.I.M.N.S.R.
- Alice Somerford Walker, Sister, Q.A.I.M.N.S.R.
- Elsie Joan Wells, Staff Nurse, T.F.N.S.
- Dorothy Wood, Sister, T.F.N.S.

In recognition of valuable services with the British Forces in East Africa —

- Gertrude Annie Fuller, Sister, Q.A.I.M.N.S.R.
- Edith Spencer, Nursing Sister, East African Nursing Service
- Kate Thompson, Staff Nurse, Q.A.I.M.N.S.R.
- Catherine Tracey-Smith, Nursing Sister, Q.A.I.M.N.S.R.
- Maud Mary Wood, Staff Nurse, Q.A.I.M.N.S.R.

South African Military Nursing Service

- Dolores Lucy Bishop, Staff Nurse
- Alexandra Elizabeth, Lowe, Nursing Sister
- Margaret Roberts, Nursing Sister
- Alice Rose-Innes, Nursing Sister
- Frederica Walbrugh, Nursing Sister

In recognition of valuable services within the Union of South Africa in connection with the War —

- Nurse Lilian Mary Blackburn, SA Military Nursing Service (S.A.M.N.S.)
- Nursing Sister Daisy Hamilton, S.A.M.N.S.
- Nursing Sister Agnes Louch, S.A.M.N.S.
- Nurse Avis Kathleen Philpott, S.A.M.N.S.

==== Awarded a Bar to the Royal Red Cross ====
In recognition of valuable services with the Armies in Egypt —

- Emily Agnes Cox RRC Matron, Q.A.I.M.N.S.R.
- Katherine Forbes Gordon Skinner RRC Sister, Q.A.I.M.N.S.

In recognition of valuable services with the Armies in France and Flanders —

- Margaret Alexander RRC Sister in Charge, Civilian Hospital, Special Reserve
- Gertrude Mary Allen RRC Acting Matron, Q.A.I.M.N.S.
- Annie Inglis Baird RRC Sister in Charge, Q.A.I.M.N.S.R.
- Mary Cruikshank Laing RRC Sister in Charge, T.F.N.S.
- Lilian Emily MacKay RRC Acting Principal Matron, Q.A.I.M.N.S.
- Ethel Jane Minns RRC Acting Principal Matron, Q.A.I.M.N.S.
- Mary Louisa Rannie RRC Acting Principal Matron, Q.A.I.M.N.S.
- Una Elizabeth Russell-Lee RRC Sister in Charge, Q.A.I.M.N.S.R.
- Eva Owen Schofield RRC Sister in Charge, Civilian Hospital, Special Reserve
- Adelaide Louisa Walker RRC Acting Matron, Q.A.I.M.N.S.

Canadian Army Medical Corps

- Evelyn Martha Wilson RRC Matron

New Zealand Army Nursing Service

- Evelyn Gertrude Brooke RRC Matron

In recognition of valuable services with the British Forces in Italy —

- Margaret Steenson RRC Principal Matron, Q.A.I.M.N.S.

In recognition of valuable services with the British Forces in Mesopotamia

- Ethel Rose Collins RRC Sister, Q.A.I.M.N.S.
- Florence May Hodgins RRC Matron, Q.A.I.M.N.S.
- Edith MacFarlane RRC Matron, T.F.N.S.
- Jessie Phillipson Stow RRC Sister, Q.A.I.M.N.S.R.
- Mass Mary Walker RRC Sister, Q.A.I.M.N.S.

=== Kaisar-i-Hind Medal ===
First Class

- The Reverend George Pittendrigh, Additional Member of the Council of His Excellency the Governor of Madras, and Professor of the Madras Christian College
- Ida Monahan, wife of Mr. Francis John Monahan, Indian Civil Service, Bengal
- Lt.-Col. Richard Henderson Castor, Indian Medical Service, Civil Surgeon, Moulmein, Burma
- Motirain Showkiram Advani, District Judge, Broach, Bombay
- Clement Cornelius Caleb Professor of Physiology, King Edward Memorial College, Lahore
- Hugh Gordon Roberts officiating Civil Surgeon, Shillong, Assam
- Henry Martin Bull, Member of the Majlis-i-Khas, Gwalior State, Central India
- Steuart Durand Pears, late Chief Engineer and Secretary to Government, Public Works Department, Madras
- Khan Bahadur Dhunjishaw Cooverji Pestonji, Honorary Magistrate, Mhow, Central India
- John Somerwell Hoyland, Head Master, Friends Mission High School, Hoshangabad, Central Provinces

=== Medal of the Order of the British Empire ===
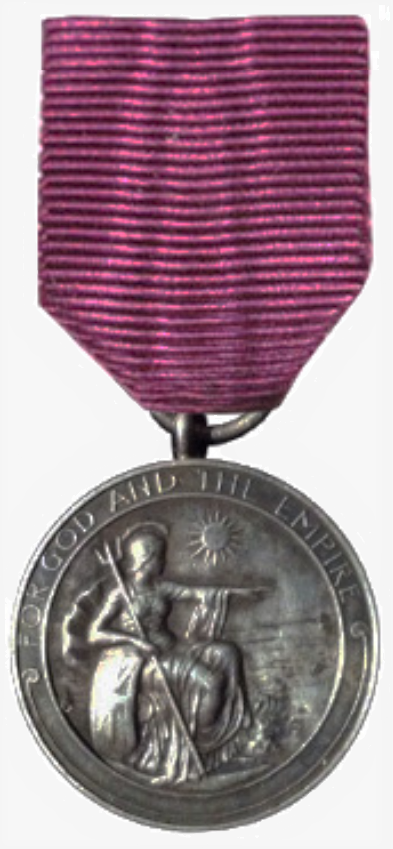
Medal of the Order of the British Empire

Military Division
For Gallantry

- Marjorie Beryl Brisley, Women's Royal Air Force, Upton, Chester. Citation – "For gallant conduct and devotion to duty at Upton on the 17th December, 1918, in extricating one of the occupants from a crashed aeroplane, and assisting to remove the second man from the wreckage."

=== Distinguished Service Order (DSO) ===
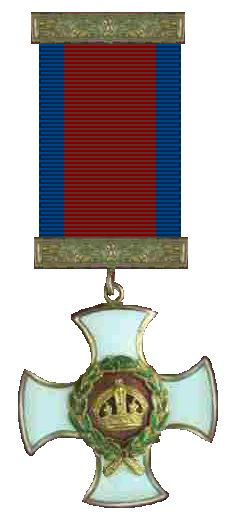
Riband and Badge of the Distinguished Service Order

In recognition of distinguished services rendered during the war —

- Capt. Wyndham Lindsay Birch MBE West Yorkshire Regiment
- Lt.-Col. Ernest Leslie Gossage MC Royal Artillery
- Capt. Roy King DFC Australian Flying Corps
- Lt.-Col. Cuthbert Trelawder Maclean MC Royal Scots Fusiliers
- Maj. Laurence Arthur Pattinson MC DFC Royal Fusiliers
- Lt.-Col. Charles Erskine Risk, Royal Marine Light Infantry
- Maj. John Cannon Russell, Royal Engineers

For distinguished service in connection with military operations in the Balkans —

- Capt. Evelyn Hugh Barker MC King's Royal Rifle Corps
- Temp Lt. Edmund Francis Herring MC Royal Field Artillery
- Temp Maj. Basil Archer. Jackson MC Shropshire Light Infantry
- Maj. Denis Erskine Knollys, Indian Army
- Maj. John Arthur Claude Kreyer, Indian Army
- Temp Maj. Humphrey Francis Mason, Royal Garrison Artillery
- Temp Maj. Anton Peltzer, East Lancashire Regiment
- Temp Maj. Harold George Rickwood MC South Lancashire Regiment
- Lt. Ernest Monkhouse Rogers-Tillstone MC Royal Field Artillery, Special Reserve
- Temp Maj. Frank Vincent Shaw MC Royal Field Artillery
- Capt. and Bt. Maj. Percy Stanley Tomlinson, Royal Army Medical Corps
- Capt. Stanley Watson MC Cheshire Regiment

For distinguished service in connection with military operations in East Africa —

- Capt. Edward Beckford Bevan, Norfolk Regiment and King's African Rifles
- Capt. Alexander Charles Masters MC South Wales Borderers, and King's African Rifles
- Capt. Charles George Phillips MC West Yorkshire Regiment and King's African Rifles

For distinguished services rendered in connection with military operations in Eastern Russia —

- Temp Lt. Charles Dunlop OBE Scottish Rifles

Canadian Forces

- Lt.-Col. Joseph Whiteside Boyle

For distinguished service in connection with military operations in France and Flanders—

- Temp Maj. Douglas Charles Allen, Tank Corps
- Capt. and Bt. Maj. Henry Adair Allen, Royal Inniskilling Fusiliers
- Maj. Fearnley Anderson MC Seaforth Highlanders
- Temp Maj. William Arnold, Tank Corps
- Lt.-Col. Walter Arthy, Royal Garrison Artillery
- Capt. Ernest Arthur Ash, Middlesex Regiment, Special Reserve, comdg. Durham Light Infantry
- Temp Maj. Walter Hubert Baddeley MC East Surrey Regiment
- Capt. Basil Hume Badham, Royal Scots Fusiliers
- Lt. Colin Willoughby Baker MC Leicestershire Regiment
- Maj. John Arthur Ballard, Royal Field Artillery
- Acting Capt. Albert Methuen Bankier MC Argyll and Sutherland Highlanders
- Capt. Arthur Gordon Barry MC Manchester Regiment, comdg. Machine Gun Corps
- Capt. John Nelson Barstow MC Royal Field Artillery
- Maj. Miles Beevor, East Kent Regiment, attd. Middlesex Regiment
- Capt. Augustus Charles Herbert Benke MC London Regiment
- Temp Capt. Fred Roland Berridge MC Northamptonshire Regiment
- Capt. Frederick William Bewsher MC London Regiment
- Maj. Robert Bryan Bickerdike, Royal Field Artillery
- Temp Maj. Hugh George Bigg-Wither, Duke of Cornwall's Light Infantry
- Maj. William Birtwistle, Royal Field Artillery
- Capt. Norman Valentine Blacker MC East Yorkshire Regiment, attd. Machine Gun Corps
- Capt. Patrick James Blair, Royal Scots, attd. Royal Highlanders
- Maj. Edward Hoblyn Warren Bolitho, Royal Field Artillery
- Quartermaster and Capt. Francis Sydney Boshell MC Royal Berkshire Regiment
- Capt. Henry Kirk Boyle, West Yorkshire Regiment, attd. Machine Gun Corps
- Capt. Edwin Percival Brassey MC Coldstream Guards, Special Reserve, attd. 2nd Battalion
- Capt. Richard Hugh Royds Brocklebank, 9th Lancers
- Maj. Donald Brown, Royal Field Artillery
- Temp Capt. Herbert Compton Browning MC Bedfordshire Regiment
- Lt. John Nevile Buchanan MC Grenadier Guards, Special Reserve
- Lt.-Col. Stephen Darle Bullen, Royal Garrison Artillery
- Quartermaster and Maj. John Burke MC DCM Royal Dublin Fusiliers
- Capt. Charles Desborough Burnell, London Regiment
- Temp Maj. Richard Parry Burnett MC South Staffordshire Regiment, attd. Royal Fusiliers
- Maj. Stanilaus Burrell, Northumberland Hussars
- Capt. Henry Neville Burroughes Royal Army Medical Corps
- Maj. Ivor Buxton, Norfolk Yeomanry
- Lt. Aylmer Lochiel Cameron MC Royal Field Artillery
- Capt. Gerald Goodwin Carpenter, Suffolk Regiment
- Maj. Sydney Carwithen, Royal Artillery
- Lt. James Reid Christie, Gordon Highlanders
- Maj. Douglas Clapham OBE Royal Garrison Artillery
- Temp Capt. Frederick William Clark MC Royal Engineers
- Lt.-Col. Humphrey Nichols Mavesyn Clegg, Denb. Yeomanry, comdg. Royal Welsh Fusiliers
- Capt. William George Alexander Coldwell, Northamptonshire Regiment, comdg. Machine Gun Corps
- Capt. Louis Andrew Connolly MC Royal Field Artillery
- Maj. Edward Douglas Montague Hunter Cooke, Royal Field Artillery
- Capt. William Middleship Cooper MC Royal Garrison Artillery
- Capt. John Robert Cowan-Douglas MC Highland Light Infantry
- Capt. Victor Leopold Spencer Cowley MC Royal Irish Rifles
- Capt. Peter McFarland Cram, Cameron Highlanders
- Maj. Francis Lindisfarne Morley Grossman MC Royal Field Artillery
- Lt.-Col. Ivor Bertram Fendall Carrie, Royal Garrison Artillery
- Capt. and Bt. Maj. Henry Osborne Curtis MC King's Royal Rifle Corps
- Maj. Joseph Isidore D'Arcy, Royal Field Artillery
- Maj. Delme William Campbell Davies-Evans, Pembroke Yeomanry, attd. Worcestershire Regiment
- Temp Capt. Guy de Hoghton Dawson, Royal Army Medical Corps
- Maj. Francis Reginald Day, Norfolk Regiment
- Maj. Noel Arthur Lacy Day, Royal Artillery
- Lt. William John Deacon, Royal Field Artillery
- Maj. Harold Arthur Denham, Royal Garrison Artillery
- Lt.-Col. and Bt. Col. Hugo Douglas De Prée CB CMG Royal Artillery
- Temp Maj. John Bigelow Dodge DSC Suffolk Regiment, attd. Sussex Regiment
- Maj. Charles Milligan Drew Royal Army Medical Corps
- Lt.-Col. Arthur. David Ducat Royal Army Medical Corps
- Temp Capt. George Vernon. Dudley MC Royal Garrison Artillery
- Maj. Gilbert Ewart Dunsdon, Royal Garrison Artillery
- Maj. George Nowers Dyer, Royal West Surrey Regiment
- Capt. and Bt. Maj. Thomas Ralph Eastwood MC Rifle Brigade
- Capt. Guy Janion Edwards MC Coldstream Guards
- Maj. Herbert Ivor Powell Edwards, Sussex Yeomanry, attd. Royal Sussex Regiment
- Capt. John Henry Murray Edye MC York and Lancaster Regiment
- Maj. Arthur Henry Falkner, Royal Army Medical Corps, attd. Liverpool Regiment
- Capt. Stafford Hubert Ferrand MC King's Royal Rifle Corps, attd. East Yorkshire Regiment
- Capt. John Malcolm Fisher MC York and Lancaster Regiment
- Temp Maj. Tom Forester, Machine Gun Corps
- Lt.-Col. Douglas Evans Forman CMG Royal Horse Artillery, attd. Royal Field Artillery
- Maj. John Raffray Foster, Royal Artillery
- Temp Maj. Thomas Foster, Royal Sussex Regiment
- Capt. John Alexander Foxton, West Yorkshire Regiment
- Capt. and Bt. Maj. Geoffrey Ernest Warren Franklyn MC Royal Artillery
- Lt. Francis Hugh Fraser MC West Riding Regiment
- Capt. John Henry Pearson Frasef MC Royal Army Medical Corps
- Lt. Jasper Gray Frere MC Suffolk Regiment, attd. Machine Gun Corps
- Maj. Henry Davis Gale MC Royal Artillery
- Capt. Rudolf William Galloway Royal Army Medical Corps
- Capt. Lancelot Merivale Gibbs MC Coldstream Guards
- Lt. William Charles Disraeli Giffin MC Royal Irish Rifles
- Capt. and Bt. Maj. Halbert James Glendinning, Royal Field Artillery
- Maj. Thomas Ciosbie Goff, Royal Garrison Artillery
- Capt. Alan Douglas Gordon MC Royal Berkshire Regiment Machine Gun Corps
- Capt. Gerald Wentworth Gore-Langton MC 18th Hussars
- Capt. Christopher Hugh Gotta MC Devonshire Regiment
- Capt. Kenneth Ian Gourlay MC Royal Engineers
- Capt. and Bt. Maj. Arthur Edward Grasett MC Royal Engineers
- Temp Capt. Frederick Buss Gray-stone MC Royal Artillery
- Temp Lt.-Col. James McGavin Greig, West Yorkshire Regiment, attd. York and Lancaster Regiment
- Maj. Howard Charles Grabble, Royal Field Artillery
- Capt. Edward Johns Grinling MC Lincolnshire Regiment
- Maj. Arthur Marjoribanks Guild, Highland Cyclist Battalion, attd. London Regiment
- Maj. Atthelstane Claud Gunter, Royal Garrison Artillery
- Capt. Henry Ronald Hall MC Royal Field Artillery
- Temp Capt. John Hathorn Hall MC
- Maj. Philip de Havilland Hall MC Royal Engineers
- Temp Maj. Robert Bruce Harkness, Welsh Regiment
- Lt. Ernest Albert Edward Hart MC Royal Field Artillery
- Temp Lt.-Col. George White Hawkes MC Royal Irish Rifles
- Capt. Cecil Richard Hayward, West Somerset Yeomanry, comdg. Somerset Light Infantry
- Quartermaster and Maj. Alfred Noble Haywood, 6th Dragoon Guards
- Capt. Henry Eric Hebbert MC Royal Engineers
- Temp Maj. James Gerald Patrick Heffernan MC Royal Dublin Fusiliers
- Temp Lt. Henry Norris Hemsley MC
- Lt.Percival Robert Henri MC attd. London Regiment
- Maj. Robert Edward Udny Hermon-Hodge, Oxfordshire Yeomanry
- Temp Maj. Laurence Carr Hill MC Royal Engineers
- Capt. Edward Godfrey Hoare, Yorkshire Light Infantry, attd. Royal Lancaster Regiment
- Maj. Rupert Thurstan Holland MC Royal Artillery
- Lt. Ernest William Home, Devonshire Regiment
- Lt.-Col. Guy Jefferys Hornsby-Wright, Essex Regiment
- Lt. Allen Crawford Howard MC Royal Engineers
- Capt. William James Hddswortih Howard, Liverpool Regiment
- Capt. Ivor-Robert Hudleston, Royal Army Medical Corps
- Capt. and Bt. Maj. Hubert-Charles Edward Hull, Royal West Surrey Regiment
- Temp Maj. Arthur Frederick Hunt
- Maj. John Markham Ingram, Royal Field Artillery
- Maj. Thomas William Talbot Isaac, Gloucestershire Regiment, attd. Yorkshire Light Infantry
- Maj. Claud Hugh Irving Jackson, Royal Scots Fusiliers, attd. Machine Gun Corps
- Lt.-Col. Arthur Hyde Kane, Royal Garrison Artillery
- Lt. Peter Chrichton Kay MC Middlesex Regiment
- Lt. John Dunbar Kelly, Royal Army Service Corps
- Temp Capt. Percy Hubert Keys MC Royal Engineers
- Temp Maj. Albert George Keyser, Machine Gun Corps
- Capt. Miles Henry King MC West Riding Regiment
- Temp Capt. Geoffry Neville Kingsford MC Royal Engineers
- Capt. James Joseph Kingstone MC 2nd Dragoon Guards
- Maj. Cyril Kitchin, Middlesex Regiment
- Temp Capt. George Ledgard MC Royal Engineers
- Temp Maj. John Evan Lewis, Tank Corps
- Maj. Frederick Beadle Leyland MVO 7th Hussars
- Maj. Owen Fitzstephen Lloyd, Connaught Rangers, secd. Tank Corps
- Temp Lt. Commander Edward Marston Lockwood RNVR
- Col. William Longbottom, North Lancashire Regiment
- Lt. Charles Edward Berkeley Lowe MC Royal Garrison Artillery
- Maj. Philip Lyon, North Staffordshire Regiment, attd. Tank Corps
- Capt. and Bt. Maj. Archer Geoffrey Lyttelton, Welsh Regiment, comdg. Machine Gun Corps
- Maj. Lachlan Mackinnon, Gordon Highlanders, attd. Argyll and Sutherland Highlanders
- Lt.-Col. James Strachan MacLeod, Durham Light Infantry, attd. Lancashire Fusiliers
- Temp Lt. Thomas Bertram Joseph Mahar MC
- Lt. Richard Herbert Marryatt, Worcestershire Regiment
- Capt. and Hon Maj. James Evan Baillie Martin CVO late King's Royal Rifle Corps
- Lt. Frank Arnold Vivanti Dewar Mathews MC Royal Engineers
- Temp Maj. Ralph Walter Maude
- Capt. Godfrey Kindersley Maurice, Royal Army Medical Corps
- Maj. William McClure, South Lancashire Regiment
- Capt. Arthur Cecil Hays McCullagh Royal Army Medical Corps
- Maj. Arthur Sydney Ponsonby McGhee, Royal Garrison Artillery
- Capt. Neil McMicking MC Royal Highlanders
- Lt.-Col. John Hamilton Meikle, Royal Field Artillery
- Temp Capt. John McKenzie Menzies MC Royal Field Artillery
- Lt. William Godwin Michelmore MC Royal Engineers, attd. Royal Engineers
- Lt. Gerard William Miller MC Liverpool Regiment, attd. Lancashire Fusiliers
- Capt. John Miller MC Royal Army Medical Corps
- Maj. Ralph Noel Vernan Montgomery, Royal Field Artillery
- Temp Capt. Frederick William Moore MC Royal Engineers
- Capt. Harold Edward Moore MC Royal Engineers
- Capt. Howel Gwyn Moore-Gwyn MC Rifle Brigade
- Capt. William Duthie Morgan MC Royal Field Artillery
- Capt. Eric Wells Morris, Connaught Rangers, attd. Cheshire Regiment
- Lt. David William Moss MC Royal Garrison Artillery
- Maj. and Bt. Lt.-Col. Thomas Couper Mudie, Royal Scots
- Capt. John Muller MC Welsh Regiment, comdg. Machine Gun Corps
- Temp Maj. William Murray MC Highland Light Infantry, attd. Royal Scots
- Temp Maj. William Hugh Murray, Scottish Rifles
- Capt. Reginald Nasmith MC Highland Light Infantry, comdg. MrG. Corps
- Capt. and Bt. Maj. Robert Francis Brydges Naylor MC South Staffordshire Regiment
- Temp Lt.-Col. Frederick William Monk Newell, Royal Engineers
- Capt. Arthur Leslie Walter Newth MC Gloucestershire Regiment, attd. London Regiment
- Lt. Randolph Nicholson MC Royal Field Artillery
- Capt. Dudley Nisbet MC South Lancashire Regiment
- Maj. Donald de Courcey O'Grady, Royal Army Medical Corps
- Lt. Herbert Joseph Mary O'Reilly MC Royal Irish Rifles
- Temp Lt.-Col. Stanislaus Julian Ostrorog, Royal Artillery
- Maj. Harold Parker, North Lancashire Regiment
- Maj. David Paterson, Royal Field Artillery
- Temp Capt. Geoffrey Peireon MC
- Capt. Harold Peploe, Royal West Kent Regiment
- Capt. Edward Phillips MC Royal Army Medical Corps
- Maj. Charles Edward Pierson, Royal Field Artillery
- Lt.-Col. and Bt. Col. James Hawkins-Whitshed Pollard CB CMG Royal Scots Fusiliers
- Maj. Hugh Alexander Pollock, Royal Scots Fusiliers
- Lt.-Col. Gerald Robert Poole CMG Royal Marine Artillery
- Temp Capt. Norman Porteous MC Royal Engineers
- Capt. Brian Bevil Quiller-Couch MC Royal Field Artillery
- Maj. George Bantham Leathart Rae, Liverpool Regiment, attd. Manchester Regiment
- Capt. Wilfred Taunton Raikes MC South Wales Borderers, comdg. Machine Gun Corps
- Maj. Richard Montague Raynsford, Leinster Regiment, attd. Connaught Rangers
- Lt. Hugh Stanley Read MC London Regiment
- Maj. Alexander Kirkwood Reid MC Highland Light Infantry
- Lt. Norman Reid MC Royal Field Artillery
- Temp Maj. William. Brown Rennie MC
- Maj. Alan Boyd Reynolds, 12th Lancers, comdg. Northumberland Hussars Yeomanry
- Maj. Cyril Herbert Reynolds MC Royal Garrison Artillery
- Capt. Collen Edward Melville Richards MC East Lancashire Regiment, attd. Middlesex Regiment
- Temp Maj. Adolphus Noah Richardson MC Machine Gun Corps
- Maj. Frederick William Richey, Royal Garrison Artillery
- Capt. Thomas Ridgway MC South Lancashire Regiment
- Capt. Reginald Harday Ridler, London Regiment, attd. Somerset Light Infantry
- Temp Lt.-Col. Thomas Purvis Ritzema, Royal Field Artillery
- Capt. Brian Hubert Robertson MC Royal Engineers
- Lt. James. Albert Roddick MC Liverpool Regiment, attd. West Riding Regiment
- Temp Maj. Harry Percival Rogers, Royal Fusiliers
- Temp Capt. Robson Wilson Rotherford MC
- Lt. Gilbert Rowan MC Royal Highlanders
- Maj. William Orpen Sikottowe Sanders, Royal Garrison Artillery
- Maj. Gilbert Ayshford Sanford, 20th Hussars
- Maj. Alfred Carlisle Sayer MC Sussex Yeomanry, attd. Royal Sussex Regiment
- Maj. John Scott, Royal Field Artillery
- Capt. Geofrey Lynton Sharpe, West Riding Regiment, attd. Army Cyclist Corps
- Maj. Arthur Llewellyn Bancroft Shaw, Lancashire Fusiliers
- Lt. John James Sheppard MC London Regiment
- Capt. Sydney Smith MC Royal Field Artillery
- Temp Capt. William Smyth MC Royal Engineers
- Capt. Arthur Herbert Tennyson, Lord Somers MC 1st Life Guards
- Temp Lt. Herbert Somerville-Smith MC Royal Field Artillery
- Capt. Ernest Sopper MC 17th Lancers, attd. Leicestershire Regiment
- Capt. Cecil Alleyn Thomas Spong, Royal Garrison Artillery
- Lt. Arthur Warner Stanford MC Royal Field Artillery
- Temp Maj. William Scott Stevenson MC
- Capt. Robert Graham William Hawkins Stone MC Royal Engineers
- Maj. Francis Gerald Strange, Berkshire Yeomanry
- Capt. Humphrey Cecil Travell Stronge MC East Kent Regiment
- Lt. Bill Stuart, Royal Field Artillery
- Capt. John William Cotter Stubbs MC Royal Army Medical Corps
- Temp Maj. Frederick Summers MC Royal Engineers
- Temp Maj. Hector William Sutherland, King's Own Scottish Borderers
- Temp Maj. George Vere Taylor MC Rifle Brigade
- Brig.-Maj. Leonard Mainwaring Taylor MC Yorkshire Light Infantry
- Maj. The Hon, Eric Richard Thesiger, Surrey Yeomanry
- Capt. David Thomson MC Royal Field Artillery
- Maj. Edward Lionel Thomson, York and Lancaster Regiment
- Maj. James Noel Thomson MC Royal Field Artillery
- Maj. John Ferguson Thomson, North Staffordshire Regiment
- Lt.-Col. William Thorburn, Royal Scots
- Capt. Justice Crosland Tilly MC West Yorkshire Regiment, comdg. Tank Corps
- Capt. Robert Hill Tolerton MC London Regiment
- Capt. the Hon Denis Plantagenet Tolleanache, 7th Hussars
- Capt. and Bt. Maj. Edward Devereux Hamilton Tollemache MC Coldstream Guards
- Lt. Frederick Georgei Tollworthy MC London Regiment
- Lt.-Col. George Alexander Trent CMG Northamptonshire Regiment
- Capt. Alexander James Trousdell MC Royal Irish Fusiliers
- Maj. George Frederic Brown Turner, Royal Field Artillery
- Maj. Harold Northcote Vinen, Gloucestershire Regiment
- Capt. Montagu George Edward Walker, Royal Artillery
- Maj. Charles Talbot Joseph Gerard Walmesley MC Berkshire Yeomanry
- Capt. Charles Herbert Walsh MC Connaught Rangers
- Maj. Evan Bernard Ward, Duke of Cornwall's Light Infantry
- Capt. Robert Ogier Ward, Honourable Artillery Company
- Maj. Kenneth Charles Harman Warner, York and Lancaster Regiment
- Temp Capt. Aubrey Wentworth Harrison Watson MC late King's Royal Rifle Corps
- Capt. Robert Albert Watson MC Royal Garrison Artillery
- Temp Maj. William Henry Lowe Watson DCM Tank Corps
- Capt. Leslie Ferguson Kennedy Way, Royal Army Medical Corps
- Maj. Ernest Steuart Weldon, Dorsetshire Regiment
- Capt. Stewart Montagu De Heriz Whatton MC Royal Field Artillery
- Temp Lt. Herbert White MC Royal Irish Rifles
- Capt. Robert Whyte MC London Regiment
- Lt. Thomas Glyndwr William MC Liverpool Regiment, attd. North Lancashire Regiment
- Temp Maj. Edward Bernard Wilson, Yorkshire Light Infantry, attd. London Regiment
- Capt. Thomas Needham Furnival Wilson MC King's Royal Rifle Corps
- Capt. Frank Hole Witts MC Irish Guards
- Maj. John Burrell Holme Woodcock, Pembroke Yeomanry, attd. Welsh Regiment
- Lt. Arthur James Wright MC Northamptonshire Regiment
- Temp Capt. Robert Yates MC Royal Engineers

Canadian Forces

- Maj. Stuart Douglas Armour, British Columbia Regiment
- Maj. Louis William Barker, Canadian Garr. Artillery
- Lt.-Col. Walker Bell, Royal Canadian Dragoons, attd. Tank Corps
- Maj. Walter Edward Blue, Canadian Field Artillery
- Lt.-Col. John Laurance Haslett Bogart, Canadian Engineers
- Maj. Frank Lorn Campbell Bond, Canadian Railway Troops
- Maj. Frederick Freer Brock, Canadian Heavy Artillery, attd. Royal Garrison Artillery
- Maj. George Sackville Browne, Canadian Field Artillery
- Lt.-Col. Alexander Douglas Cameron MC Lord Strathcona's Horse, attd. Canadian Infantry, Eastern Ontario Regiment
- Maj. Robert Stewart Carter, Canadian Railway Troops
- Maj. Allen Hughes Charles, Quebec Regiment
- Maj. Cyril William Upton Chivers MC Canadian Engineers
- Maj. Clifford Earl Churchill, Canadian Field Artillery
- Maj. Percy Edward Colman MC Canadian Mounted Rifles, Saskatchewan Regiment
- Lt.-Col. Richard Costigan, Canadian Field Artillery
- Maj. Henry William Darling Cos, Alberta Regiment, attd. East Lancashire Regiment
- Maj. Charles Stuart. Craig MC Canadian Field Artillery
- Maj. William Alexander De Grayes, Canadian Army Service Corps
- Lt.-Col. Marie Joseph Romeo Henri Desrosiers, Canadian Infantry, Quebec Regiment
- Maj. Adelbertl Augustus Durkee, Canadian Field Artillery
- Temp Maj. Wesley John Eveleigh, Canadian Infantry, Alberta Regiment
- Maj. Robert Walter Fiske, Canadian Infantry, Manitoba Regiment
- Maj. John McIntyre Gibson, Canadian Railway Troops
- Maj. Beaumont Andrew Gordon, Canadian Engineers
- Maj. James Emanuel Hahn MC Western Ontario Regiment
- Maj. Patterson Lindsay Hall MC Canadian Infantry, Quebec Regiment
- Maj. Ralph Price Harding MC Canadian Field Artillery
- Maj. Richard Henry Moore Hardisty MC Canadian Army Medical Corps
- Col. Henry Thoresby Hughes CMG Canadian Engineers
- Maj. Cyrus Fiske Inches MC Canadian Garr. Artillery
- Maj. James Colin Kemp MC Canadian Mounted Rifles, Quebec Regiment
- Maj. Andrew Robert Ketterson, Canadian Railway Troops
- Maj. Charles Clinton Leader, Canadian Railway Troops
- Lt.-Col. Ronald Hugh Macdonald MC Canadian Army Medical Corps
- Maj. Kenneth Plumb Macpherson, Canadian Engineers
- Maj. Oliver Mowat Maitland, Saskatchewan Regiment, attd. Canadian Engineers
- Maj. Frank Stanton Mathewson, Canadian Infantry, Quebec Regiment
- Maj. Joseph Edward McCorkell, Canadian Machine Gun Corps
- Maj. James McGregor, Canadian Railway Troops
- Maj. Arthur Leonard Mieville MC Canadian Engineers
- Maj. Rene Martin Redmond, Quebec Regiment
- Maj. Samuel Robson, Canadian Field Artillery, attd. 5th Canadian Div. Artillery
- Maj. Thomas Escott Ryder MC Canadian Garr. Artillery
- Maj. James Austin Scroggie MC Canadian Infantry, Manitoba Regiment
- Maj. Ernest Raymond Selby, Canadian Army Medical Corps
- Maj. Leonard Ernest Silcox, Canadian Railway Troops
- Lt.-Col. Sanford Fleming Smith, Canadian Light Horse
- Capt. Hugh Macdonald Wallis, Quebec Regiment
- Maj. James Alexander Gordon White MC Canadian Engineers
- Capt. Ralph Willcock MC Canadian Infantry, Quebec Regiment
- Maj. John Douglas Young MC Canadian Infantry, Manitoba Regiment
- Capt. Lewis Younger MC Alberta Regiment

Australian Imperial Force

- Lt.-Col. William Llewellyn Arrell, Australian Infantry
- Maj. William Alan Audsley, Australia Field Artillery
- Maj. Duncan Beith, Australian Infantry
- Col. Henry Gordon Bennett CB CMG 3rd Australian Infantry Brigade
- Col. James Harold Cannan CB CMG 11th Australian Infantry Brigade
- Maj. John Austin Chapman, Australian Infantry
- Quartermaster and Hon Maj. John Duffy, 13th Australia Lt. Horse Regiment
- Capt. Herbert Roy Gollan MC Australian Infantry
- Maj. Francis George Grant, Australian Infantry
- Lt.-Col. John Herbert Hurst, 36th Australia Heavy Artillery Brigade
- Lt.-Col. Hugh Bennett Lowers OBE Australian Army Medical Corps
- Maj. Alexander. Mitchell, 13th Australia Light Horse Regiment
- Maj. Basil Moorhouse Morris, 14th Brigade, Australia Field Artillery
- Maj. John Robb Muirhead, Australia Army Medical Corps
- Maj. Edward Joseph Parks MC Australian Infantry
- Lt.-Col. Alexander Thomas Paterson MC Australian Infantry
- Lt.-Col. Rupert Markham Sadler MC Australian Infantry
- Maj. Edward Kenneth Smart MC 10th Brigade, Australia Field Artillery
- Maj. Marcus Vicars Southey, Australia Army Medical Corps
- Lt.-Col. Clive Wentworth Thompson, Australia Army Medical Corps
- Maj. William Tomkinson, Australia Field Artillery
- Lt.-Col. Frank Couper Wooster, Australian Army Medical Corps

New Zealand Forces

- Lt.-Col. Rawdon St. John Beere, NZ Rifle Brigade
- Maj. Philip John Jory NZ Army Medical Corps
- Maj. Alexander Allan MacNab, NZ Rifle Brigade
- Lt.-Col. Robert Stirrat McQuarrie MC NZ Field Artillery
- Lt.-Col. Owen Herbert Mead, Canterbury Regiment
- Maj. Erima Harvey Northcroft, NZ Field Artillery
- Maj. Alan Bernard Williams, NZ Field Artillery

South African Forces

- Maj. Clifford Percy Ward, SA Horse Artillery, attd. Royal Garrison Artillery

For distinguished service in connection with military operations in Italy —

- Maj. William, Bradley Gosset Barne, Royal Garrison Artillery
- Temp Maj. Henry James Brooks MC
- Capt. John Risdon Murdock Crawford MC Royal Engineers
- Capt. Lawrence Francis Garratt MC Royal Garrison Artillery
- Capt. William Gordon MC Gordon Highlanders
- Lt. Albert Hoare MC Royal Garrison Artillery
- Capt. and Bt. Maj. Edward Lafone Graham Lawrence MC Worcestershire Regiment
- Temp Maj. Philip Lionel Lincoln MC Northumberland Fusiliers
- Capt. and Bt. Maj. George Humphrey Maurice, Lindsay, King's Own Scottish Borderers
- Maj. Wilfrid Humphrey Mosley MC Wiltshire Regiment
- Capt. Charles Joseph O'Reilly MC Royal Army Medical Corps
- Capt. James Gray Simpson MC Cameron Highlanders
- Temp Capt. Allen Edgar Thompson MC Royal Army Medical Corps
- Capt. Edmund Wayne Vaughan MC Royal Army Medical Corps
- Temp Maj. Edward Viner, Manchester Regiment
- Capt. Philip Lowndes Wright MC Oxfordshire and Buckinghamshire Light Infantry
- Col. Charles Stuart Wilson CB CMG late Royal Engineers

For distinguished services rendered in connection with military operations in Mesopotamia —

- Lt.-Col. Frederick Arthur Frazer, Royal West Kent Regiment
- Capt. Edward William Charles Noel CIE Indian Army, attd. Political Department
- Maj. and Bt. Lt.-Col. Digby Inglis Shuttleworth, 3rd Gurkha Rifles, Indian Army

==== Awarded a Bar to the Distinguished Service Order (DSO*) ====
In recognition of distinguished services rendered during the war —

- Lt.-Col. Frederick William Bowhill DSO

For distinguished service in connection with military operations in France and Flanders—

- Temp Maj. William Veasey Franklin DSO South Wales Borderers, attd. Worcestershire Regiment
- Lt.-Col. John Murray DSO Scottish Horse Yeomanry, attd. Royal Scots

Canadian Forces

- Maj. Harold Murchison Savage DSO Canadian Field Artillery

For distinguished service in connection with military operations in Italy —

- Capt., and Bt. Maj. William Charles Coleman Gell DSO MC
- Capt. and Bt. Maj. Walter Marlborough Pryor DSO Hertfordshire Regiment

=== Distinguished Flying Cross (DFC) ===
- Lt. Arthur Hugh Alban Alban, Royal Field Artillery
- Lt. Fred Hubert Baguley
- Maj. Cecil Baker, Australian Flying Corps
- Lt. James Montemerli Batting
- Lt. Edward Balfour Somerset Beaton, Australian Flying Corps
- Lt. Victor Beecroft
- Lt. Arthur Leslie Brice Bennett, Hampshire Regiment
- Capt. Norman Arthur Bolton, Royal Field Artillery
- 2nd Lt. Percy Boulton
- Capt. Geoffrey Hilton Bowman DSO MC Royal Warwickshire Regiment
- Lt. Cecil Alchin Bridgland, East Surrey Regiment
- 2nd Lt. Henry Peareth Brumell
- 2nd Lt. Douglas Scott Carrie
- 2nd Lt. William Alexander Carrothers, Canadian Infantry
- Lt. Hugh Campbell Chambers
- Lt. Alfred Edward Chittenden
- 2nd Lt. William Coker, East Surrey Regiment
- Lt. Harry Neville Compton
- Capt. Arthur Coningham DSO MC
- 2nd Lt. Irving Banfield Corey
- 2nd Lt. Reginald Cyril Creamer
- Lt. Charles William Cudemore MC
- Lt. Donald Brodby Gumming, Indian Army Reserve of Officers
- Lt. John Cunliffe
- Lt. Ernest Edgar Davies, Australian Flying Corps
- Lt. William Henry Demel, Manchester Regiment
- 2nd Lt. James Carlos Deremo
- Lt. James Henry Dewhurst
- 2nd Lt. Clennel Haggerston Picking, Canadian Infantry
- Capt. Thomas Malcolm Dickinson
- Lt. Norman Stuart Dougall, Lincolnshire Regiment
- 2nd Lt. George Emerson Dowler
- Lt. Stanley Lorne Dowsell, Canadian Infantry
- Lt. John Edgcumbe Doyle
- Lt. Arthur Thomas Drinkwater
- Lt. Lancelot de Saumarez Duke, Canadian Infantry
- Lt. Duncan Campbell Dunlop
- 2nd Lt. Arthur Cyril Dutton, Royal West Kent Regiment
- Lt. Cecil Stewart Emden, Royal West Kent Regiment
- Lt. Preston Anthony Augustus Enright
- Lt. Ray Templar Fagan
- Capt. Cecil Fawssett, Royal Sussex Regiment
- Lt. Hedley Ford, Northumberland Fusiliers
- Lt. Spencer George Ford
- Lt. James Walker Foreman
- Lt. William Tom Fraser, Royal Field Artillery
- Capt. William Cecil Gage
- Capt. Ewart James Garland
- Maj. Alfred Guy Rowland Garrod MC Leicestershire Regiment
- 2nd Lt. Arthur James Gareide
- Lt. Frank George Gibbons
- Lt. Herbert Melhuish Golding
- 2nd Lt. Frederick Stanley Gordon
- Lt. Reginald John Patrick Grebby
- Lt. Jack Courtenay Green
- Lt. Richard Grice
- Lt. Ernest Alexander Devlin Hamilton, Australian Flying Corps
- 2nd Lt. Edgar Cyril Harris, King's Royal Rifle Corps
- Capt. Gilbert James Barter
- Lt. Frederick Cecil Hawley, Australian Flying Corps
- Lt. George Rensbury Hicks
- Lt. James Cyril Holmes
- Lt. John Albert Hoogte
- Lt. Geoffrey Herbert Hooper MC Royal Engineers
- Lt. George Vivian Howard
- Capt. Owen Hughes
- Lt. William Jack
- Lt. Norman Hugh Jenkins DSM
- Lt. Francis Richard Johnson
- 2nd Lt. Paul Alan Hastings King
- Lt. Orville Lamplough, Australian Flying Corps
- Lt. John Henry Latchford
- Capt. Walter Brogden Lawson
- Capt. Cyril Mountain Leman MC
- Lt. William Kerr Robertson Liddell, Highland Light Infantry
- Lt. William Schuyler Lighthall, Dorsetshire Regiment
- Lt. Humphrey Norman Lock, Indian Army
- Lt. Alan Rodman McAfee
- Lt. Godfrey Newman McBlain
- Lt. Frank Stephenson McClurg
- Lt. Archibald Duncan MacDonald, 42nd Squadron, Canadian Engineers
- Lt. Eric Norman MacDonald
- Lt. Norman Sinclair MacGregor
- Lt. William John MacKenzie
- Capt. Gyles Mackrell
- 2nd Lt. Hugh McLean
- Lt. Malcolm Flaw MacLeod
- Lt. Charles Edmund Maitland, Royal Garrison Artillery
- 2nd Lt. Cecil Montgomery Moore
- 2nd Lt. John Richard Moorhouse
- Lt. Arthur William Murphy, Australian Flying Corps
- 2nd Lt. Cecil Walter Murray, Glasgow Yeomanry
- Lt. Frank Noble
- Lt. Harold Anthony Oaks
- Lt. Godfrey Cathbar O'Donnell
- Lt. John Emile Alexander O'Dwyer, Nottinghamshire and Derbyshire Regiment
- Lt. Kenneth John Oldfield
- Capt. Keith Rodney Park MC Royal Field Artillery
- Lt. Lawrence Fleming Pendred
- 2nd Lt. Albert Rennie Pengilly
- Lt. Arthur Pickin
- Lt. George Albert Pitt
- 2nd Lt. Horace Augustus Porter, Royal Garrison Artillery
- Lt. Hugh Victor Puckridge, Shropshire Light Infantry
- 2nd Lt. Henry Robert Albert Victor Puncher
- Lt. Thomas Gillies Rae
- Capt. William Ronald Read MC AFC Dragoon Guards
- Lt. Thomas Roberts
- Lt. Francis Ernest Robinson
- 2nd Lt. Albert Rogerson
- Lt. Hector Ross, Australian Flying Corps
- Lt.-Col. Francis Maude Roxby OBE North Staffordshire Regiment
- Lt. Frederick Stratton Russell DSC
- 2nd Lt. Richard Russell
- Lt. Henry Peters Schoeman
- 2nd Lt. Francis William Seed
- Lt. Reginald Albert Skelton
- Lt. Charles Cuthbert Snow
- 2nd Lt. Richard Stafford-Langan, Leinster Regiment
- Lt. Eric John Stephens
- Lt. Frederick Joseph Stevenson
- 2nd Lt. Henry Walter Stockdale
- Lt. John Arthur Stronach
- Lt. Claude Somerset Style
- 2nd Lt. John Francis Dymore Tanqueray
- Lt. Robert Arthur Thomas, Royal Welsh Fusiliers
- 2nd Lt. Frederick Thomasson
- Lt. Frederick Oswell Thornton
- Lt. Ulric Geoffrey Aldam Tonge
- Lt. Sydney Edward Toomer, Royal Garrison Artillery
- Lt. George Roulston Travis.
- Lt. Norman Charles Trescowthick, Australian Flying Corps
- 2nd Lt. John Turner
- Lt. Edward West Unmack
- Lt. Charles Lionel Veitch, North Lancashire Regiment
- Lt. Ignatius Welby MC
- Lt. James Joseph Wellwood, Australian Flying Corps
- Lt. Harold Albert White
- Capt. Thomas Walter White, Australian Flying Corps
- Lt. Paul Wilkins MC Royal Engineers
- Lt. Beresford Cooper Webb Windle
- Lt. Erroll Holdsworth Williams
- 2nd Lt. Henry Cawling Wood
- Lt. Frank Woolley
- Capt. John William Wright, Australian Flying Corps
- Capt. Henry Neilson Wrigley, Australian Flying Corps

==== Awarded a Bar to the Distinguished Flying Cross (DFC*) ====
- Lt. Edgar Oxenham Amm DFC
- Capt. Rupert Norman Gould Atkinson MC DFC
- 2nd Lt. Edgar George Davies DFC
- Lt. Duncan Grinnell-Milne DFC Royal Fusiliers
- Lt. Malcolm Charles McGregor DFC
- Capt. John William Finder DFC
- Capt. William Dorian Thorn DFC

==== Awarded a Second Bar to the Distinguished Flying Cross (DFC**) ====
- Lt. Walter Hunt Longton DFC* AFC

=== Distinguished Flying Medal (DFM) ===
==== Awarded a Bar to the Distinguished Flying Medal (DFM*) ====
- Sergeant Mechanic James Chapman DFM (Newcastle upon Tyne)

=== Air Force Cross ===
- Lt. Edward Melville Ackery
- Lt. Cyril Leonard Adamson
- Capt. Gordon Alchin, Royal Field Artillery
- Lt. William Algie DSO Northumberland Fusiliers
- Lt.-Col. Dermott Lang Allen, Royal Irish Fusiliers
- Capt. Frank George Andreas
- Lt. Harold Wright Arnott, Royal Engineers
- Lt. Lionel Bayard Aylen
- Capt. Lionel Mundy Bailey
- Capt. Gilbert Barrett, Royal Engineers
- Capt. Thomas Archibald Batchelor DFC
- Capt. Frederic Alan Bates MC Denbigh Yeomanry
- Col. John Harold Whitworth Becke CMG DSO Nottinghamshire and Derbyshire Regiment
- Lt. Reginald John Bedlington Benson, Welsh Regiment
- Capt. Harold John Thomas Berryman
- Col. Arthur Wellesley Bigsworth CMG DSO
- Lt.-Col. Harold Blackburn MC
- Lt. Cecil William Blain
- Capt. Ralph Sleigh Booth
- Lt. William Thomas Breach, Army Service Corps
- Lt. Henry George Samuel Broad
- Capt. Herbert Stamford Broad
- Lt. Douglas Charles Morris Brooks MC
- Capt. Leslie Oswald Brown DSC South Africa Artillery
- Maj. Rolf Sanger Brown, Australian Flying Corps
- Lt. Gerald Mornington Bryer
- Lt. Vernon William Burgess, Australian Engineers
- Maj. Albert James Butler MC Royal Irish Rifles
- Lt. William Bertram Callaway
- Lt. Geoffrey Gordon Callender, Australian Defence Force
- Capt. Cyril Wellesley Carleton, SA Defence Force
- Lt.-Col. George Ivan Carmichael DSO Royal Field Artillery
- Lt. Edgar Theodore Carpenter, Warwickshire Yeomanry
- Capt. Alexander William Cassy
- Capt. Thomas Charles Chamberlain, Middlesex Regiment
- Lt.-Col. Ennis Tristram Ratcliffe Chambers
- Lt. Lloyd Patterson Chase, Australian Flying Corps
- Lt. Frederick Walter Clark
- Maj. Edward Eric Clarke, York and Lancaster Regiment
- Capt. George Malcolm Clarke, Leinster Regiment
- Lt. Leslie Clarke, Manchester Regiment
- Capt. Geoffrey Ernest Clinton, London Scots
- Capt. Dirk Cloete MC
- Capt. Roger Bark Corfield
- Maj. Geoffrey Henry Cox, North Staffordshire Regiment
- Lt. William Reseigh Cox MC Duke of Cornwall's Light Infantry
- Capt. Horace Evelyn Craufurd
- Capt. George Mitchell Croil, Gordon Highlanders
- Lt. Hector Daniel MC
- Capt. Rhys Davies
- Maj. Horace Gordon Dean, York and Lancaster Regiment
- Capt. Dennis Milner Deighton
- Capt. John Roland Secretan Devlin DSC
- Maj. Bruno Philip Henry De Roeper
- Capt. Norman Hereford Dimmock
- Lt. Noel Parker Dixon
- Lt. Ralph Melville Dixon, 9th Berks
- Lt. Harold Hunter Down, Artists Rifles
- Lt. Stanley Ethelbert Dreschfeld
- Lt. Donald Herbert Drew
- Lt. John Drew
- Capt. Herbert Frank Stacey Drewitt MC NZ Forces
- Capt. Allan Duguid, Royal Field Artillery
- Capt. Albert Durston
- Maj. Tom Harry England DSC
- Maj. Douglas Claude Strathearn Evill DSC
- Lt. Robert Thornton Eyre
- Capt. Albert Baird Fanstone
- Lt. Gerald William Ferguson MC Royal Army Service Corps
- Maj. Frederick Bernard Fowler
- Lt. Gordon James Fowler
- 2nd Lt. Hugh Arthur Francis
- Capt. Austin Frauenfelder
- Capt. Matthew Brown Frew DSO MC Highland Light Infantry
- Capt. Philip Fletcher Fullard DSO MC Royal Irish Fusiliers
- Capt. Arthur Noel Gallehawk
- Lt. Frank George Garratt
- Capt. Philip Clarke Garratt
- Capt. Charles Leonard Elliot Geach, Dragoon Guards
- Lt. Thomas Gilbert, Indian Army Reserve of Officers
- Lt. John Lord Stuart Gill
- Lt.-Col. Stuart Grant-Dalton DSO Yorkshire Regiment
- Lt.-Col. John Crosby Halahan CBE Royal Dublin Fusiliers
- 2nd Lt. Edward Hall, York and Lancaster Regiment
- Lt. Henry Hamer
- Capt. William Andrew Hannay, Liverpool Regiment
- Lt. David Allen Harding
- Maj. Sydney Herbert Bywater Harris, King Edward's Horse
- Capt. Bernard Edward Harrison
- 2nd Lt. Robert Lionel Hartley
- Lt. Frederick William Hartridge, Royal Army Service Corps
- Lt. Gerald Harwood, Essex Regiment
- Lt. Herbert Richard Hastings
- Capt. William Lionel Hay
- Lt. Albert Ernest Hedges, York and Lancaster Regiment
- Maj. George Lockhart Piercy Henderson MC Royal Engineers
- Lt. John Bodkin Henry, Royal Inniskilling Fusiliers
- Capt. William Valentine Herbert, Australian Flying Corps
- Lt.-Col. William Charles Hicks
- Maj.-Gen. John Frederick Andrews Higgins CB DSO
- Lt. D'Arcy Fowlis Hilton MC
- Lt. Arthur Hyde Hinton, Canadian Field Artillery
- Lt. George Stacey Hodson
- Capt. Leslie Hubert Holden MC Australian Flying Corps
- Capt. Fred Parkinson Holliday DSO MC Canadian Engineers
- Capt. Henry Taylor Horsfield, Worcestershire Regiment
- Lt. Reginald Thomas Brooke Houghton, Northamptonshire Regiment
- Capt. Geoffrey Forrest Hughes MC Australian Infantry
- Capt. Robert Edward Aylmer Werge Hughes-Chamberlain
- Lt. Charles Albert Hyde, Royal Fusiliers
- Capt. Herbert Carrnichael Irwin
- Lt. John Henry Jennings, Royal Army Service Corps
- Capt. Montagu Righton Nevill Jennings MC
- Capt. Cedric Neville Jones, Nottinghamshire and Derbyshire Regiment
- Capt. Ignatius George Kelly
- Capt. Neville Kemsley
- Capt. James Kerr, Gordon Highlanders
- Lt. Stewart Gordon Knock, Seaforth Highlanders
- Lt. Charles McMenamen Laing MC Royal Scots Fusiliers
- Capt. Frederick Charles Lander
- Maj. Ralph Towlerton Leather, Warwickshire Yeomanry
- Lt.-Col. Charles Frederick Lee CMG King's Royal Rifle Corps
- Lt. Archie Mansel Lewis, Royal Garrison Artillery
- Capt. George Lawrence Lloyd MC Staffordshire Yeomanry
- Lt. Norman Baillie Lovemore
- Capt. Richard Spencer Lucy, Worcestershire Regiment
- Lt. George John Lusted
- Lt. Harold Thomas Lydford
- Capt. William Robert Brown McBain MC Royal Field Artillery
- Capt. Angus James Hugh MacColl
- Capt. William Herbert Mackenzie
- Capt. Norman MacMillan MC Highland Light Infantry
- Lt. Ronald Innes Macpherson, Dorsetshire Regiment
- Lt. Stewart Earl Mailer, Australian Infantry
- Capt. Garnet Francis Malley MC Australian Flying Corps
- Maj. Paul Copeland Maltby DSO Royal Welsh Fusiliers
- Capt. Arthur Mann MC Royal Army Service Corps
- Lt. Gilbert Henry Martingell
- Capt. George Campbell Matthews, Australian Flying Corps
- Capt. Gerald Joseph Constable Maxwell MC DFC Lovat's Scouts
- Capt. Faster Herbert Martin Maynard
- Capt. Henry Meintjes MC SA Forces
- Capt. Francis John Williamson Mellersh
- Lt. Charles Warburton Meredith, SA Engineers
- Capt. Alfred Lewis Messenger
- Lt. Norman Craig Millman MC Canadian Engineers
- Lt.-Col. Reginald Percy Mills MC Royal Fusiliers
- Maj. Geoffrey Arthur Nevett Mitchell, Royal Fusiliers
- Lt.-Col. William Gore Sutherland Mitchell DSO MC Highland Light Infantry
- Lt. Sydney James Moir, Australian Flying Corps
- Capt. Harold Henry de Baillou Monk MC King's Royal Rifle Corps
- Maj. Alan Mushet Morison
- Capt. Cecil Charles Morley
- Lt. Frank William Morter, Royal Warwickshire Regiment
- Capt. Denis Osmond Mulholland, Connaught Rangers
- Capt. Malcolm Dent Nares
- Lt. Oswald Stuart Neill
- Capt. Gilbert Dirk Nelson DSC
- Maj. Charles Henry Nicholas, South Wales Borderers
- Capt. Jack Noakes MM
- Maj. Maurice Waldegrave Noel, Liverpool Regiment
- Lt. Geoffrey Stewart O'Brian
- Lt. Henry Duniboyne O'Neill, Royal Dublin Fusiliers
- Capt. John Overton Cone Orton MC Norfolk Regiment
- Lt. George Sholto-Douglas Macfarlane Pape
- Lt. Ralph Stuart Park
- Lt. Joseph Albert Paul, Canadian Engineers
- Capt. Lionel Guy Stanhope Payne MC Suffolk Regiment
- Lt. Albert Groundes Peace, Canadian Infantry
- Lt. Arthur John Douglas Peebles, London Regiment
- Lt. Francis Brian Percy
- Lt. Maurice Walter Piercey
- Lt. Christopher Pilkangton, Shropshire Light Infantry
- Lt.-Col. Charles Frederick Pollock OBE
- Lt. Stanley Howard Preston
- Maj. Edward Radcliffe Pretyman, Somerset Light Infantry
- Lt. Frederick Horace Prime, Canadian Infantry
- Lt.-Col. Cuthbert Euan Charles Rabagliat MC Yorkshire Light Infantry
- 2nd Lt. Leslie Thomas McKay Lawler Ray, Australian Flying Corps
- Lt. Alexander Daniel Redd
- Capt. Charles Ellison Rich
- Capt. Alan Inicell Riley, Artists Regiment
- Capt. Harold Jace Roach
- Lt.-Col. Reginald Mandeville Rodwell, West Yorkshire Regiment
- Lt. Alfred Douglas Rogers
- Lt.-Col. Robert Peel Ross DSO
- Lt. Herbert Bainbridge Russell, Royal Field Artillery
- Lt. Wilfred Lloyd Rutledge MM Canadian Infantry
- Lt. Denis Charles William Sanders, Royal Field Artillery
- 2nd Lt. Bertram Soovell
- Lt. George Sewell, Lincolnshire Regiment
- Lt. William Sharpe, Grenadier Guards
- Lt. Frederick Hubert Guy Shepard
- Capt. William Allen Shirlaw, Highland Light Infantry
- Capt. Alexander Macdonald Shook DSO DSC
- Lt. Francis Dudley John Silwood
- Capt. Lawrence Hay Thomas Sloan, Cameron Highlanders
- Lt. Charles Geoffrey Harding Smith
- Capt. Ross Macpherson Smith MC DFC Australian Flying Corps
- Lt. Russell Nelson Smith
- Capt. Sebastian Oxley Smith
- Capt. Douglas Stewart, Royal Garrison Artillery
- Capt. Duncan Markham Stewart, Royal Scots
- Lt. John Lawrence Stocks
- Lt. Edward Albert Sullock, Liverpool Regiment
- Lt. James Henry Richardson Sutherland MBE
- Capt. Arthur Maxwell Swyny, Royal Irish Rifles
- Lt. Robert Keith Tailyour, Royal Field Artillery
- Capt. William Monsell Tait, Durham Light Infantry
- Lt. Leslie Taylor
- Capt. Malcolm Lincoln Taylor, Royal Engineers
- Capt. George Thorn
- Capt. Meredith Thomas, Welsh Regiment
- Lt. James Arthur Thompson
- Maj. Arthur Ashford Benjamin Thomson MC Royal Warwickshire Regiment
- Capt. Denzil Robert Thurstan
- Capt. Aubrey Mansfield Tidey
- Maj. Benjamin Travers
- Lt. Charles Tindal Travers
- Lt. Cyril Charles Teesdale Turner
- Lt. Louis Martin Van Eyssen
- Lt. Herbert Asher Vineberg
- Capt. Lawrence James Wackett DFC Australian Flying Corps
- Capt. Stanley Walker, Australian Flying Corps
- Capt. William Hastings de Warrenne Waller
- Maj. Richard Barrington Ward
- Capt. Walter Kemeys Francis Goodall Warneford
- Maj. Harold Edward Mostyn Watkins
- Capt. Donald Watson, East Yorkshire Regiment
- Lt. William Edward Watt, King Edward's Horse
- Lt. Henry Seely Whitby
- Lt. Archer Statham White
- Lt. Clifford Arthur Bernard Bowman Wilcock, Royal West Surrey Regiment
- Lt. Stephen Wilkinson
- Lt.-Col. Hugh Alexander Williamson CMG
- Lt. Charles Eardley Wilmot
- Lt. George Hamilton Bracher Wilson MC Royal Army Service Corps
- Capt. Gordon Campbell Wilson MC DCM Australian Flying Corps
- Capt. Thomas Ellames Withington, Oxfordshire and Buckinghamshire Light Infantry
- Lt. Frank Teesdale Woods, Northamptonshire Regiment
- Lt. Felix St. John Woollard, East Kent Regiment
- Lt. Arthur Banks Wright, Highland Light Infantry
- Maj. Arthur Claud Wright
- Lt. Francis Yorke-Smith

=== Meritorious Service Medal (MSM) ===
For valuable services rendered within the Union of South Africa in connection with the War —

- Staff Sergeant H. T. Ash, Veteran Reserve
- Sergeant Maj. H. C. Brockett, Veteran Reserve
- Sergeant Maj. J. F. Chapman, SA Medical Corps
- Company Sergeant Maj. C. Germon, SA Service Corps Motor Transport
- Regimental Sergeant Maj. W. Hoy, S.A.M.R.
- Staff Sergeant A. Jackson, SA Service Corps Motor Transport
- Sergeant Maj. Instr. J. Lilly, South-West Africa Permanent Force
- Sergeant Maj. Instr. E. W. Merret, South-West Africa Permanent Force
- Company Sergeant Maj. E. R. Pooley, SA Medical Corps
- Arm. Staff Sergeant H. Richardson, Permanent Force (Staff)
- Sergeant Maj. Instr. S. C. Schoneveldt, South-West Africa Permanent Force
- Staff Sergeant P. E. Twynham, SA Service Corps Motor Transport
- Regimental Sergeant Maj. J. Windrum, Permanent Force (Staff)

For valuable services rendered in the Field in connection with the Campaign in German South-West Africa —

- Sergeant T. V. Baragwanath, Hunt's Scouts, 5th Mounted Brigade, Northern Force
- Private S. G. Inglesby, Hunt's Scouts, 5th Mounted Brigade, Northern Force
- Private T. H. Stamp, Hunt's Scouts, 5th Mounted Brigade, Northern Force

=== Imperial Service Order (ISO) ===
Home Civil Service

- James Bailey, Deputy Controller, Central, Telegraph Office, General Post Office
- William Henry Eggett, Accountant, Colonial Office
- William John Farrant, Clerk for Statistical Returns, Home Office
- Arthur William King, Establishment Officer, Board of Education
- Frank Minter, Chief Examiner of Assessment in the Office of the Special Commissioners of Income Tax
- Arthur Neeves, Principal Clerk, Patent Office
- Percy Ambrose Noble Nicholls, Acting Principal Clerk, Exchequer and Audit Department
- Patrick O'Brien, Deputy Chief Inspector of Customs and Excise
- Arthur Ventris Murphy Ventris, Superintendent of the Perth (Western Australia) Branch of the Royal Mint

Colonial Civil Service

- William Ross Anderson, Secretary, Law Department, State of Victoria
- Richard Gerald Anthonisz, Government Archivist and Librarian, Island of Ceylon
- Thomas Duffield, Secretary to the Local Government Branch, Department of Lands, State of South Australia
- Frank Henry French, Inspector, Royal North West Mounted Police, Dominion of Canada
- Gascoigne Lumley, Chief Engineer, Marine Department, Nigeria
- Herbert Millar, Registrar of Deeds, province of Natal, Union of South Africa
- Robert Clare Russell, late Superintendent of Stores and Shipping, Office of the High Commissioner in London for the Union of South Africa
- William Stonham Short, Under Secretary, Public Works Department, Dominion of New Zealand
- George E. Turner, Deputy Minister of Agriculture and Mines, Colony of Newfoundland
- Wan Muhammad Isa bin Ibrahim, Orang Kay Mentri of Perak, Member of the State Council, Perak

Indian Civil Service

- Henry Richard White, Staff Clerk, Accountant-General's Department
- Honorary Maj. John Robertson, Indian Medical Department, in charge of Viceroys Dispensary.
- Diwan Bahadur Munshi Damodar Lai, Additional District and Sessions Judge, Ajmer-Merwara, Rajputana
- William George Nicoll, Head Engineer, Bombay Mint
- Khan Bahadur Saiyid Zakir Ali, Provincial Civil Service, Deputy Commissioner, Darnoh, Central Provinces
- Charles William Moss, Head Master, Madrasa-i-Azam, Madras
- Rai Bahadur Bhagavati Sahay, Inspector of Schools, Bhagalpur Division, Bihar and Orissa
- Thomas Oronan, Personal Assistant to the Director, Telegraph Engineering, Northern Circle, Lahore, Punjab
- Rao Bahadur Pandit Girdhari Lai, Provincial Civil Service, Extra Assistant Commissioner, Punjab
- Reginald Cyril Savedra, Assistant, Criminal Investigation Department, Bengal
- Raghuber Dial Mir Munsbi, Nepal Residency Office

=== Imperial Service Medal (ISM) ===
- Batto Lai, late Compounder, Gadarwara, Narsinghpur District, Central Provinces
