= 1st Middlesex Engineers =

1st Middlesex Engineer Volunteers 47th (2nd London) Divisional RE 56th (London) Divisional RE 101 (London) Field Engineer Regiment
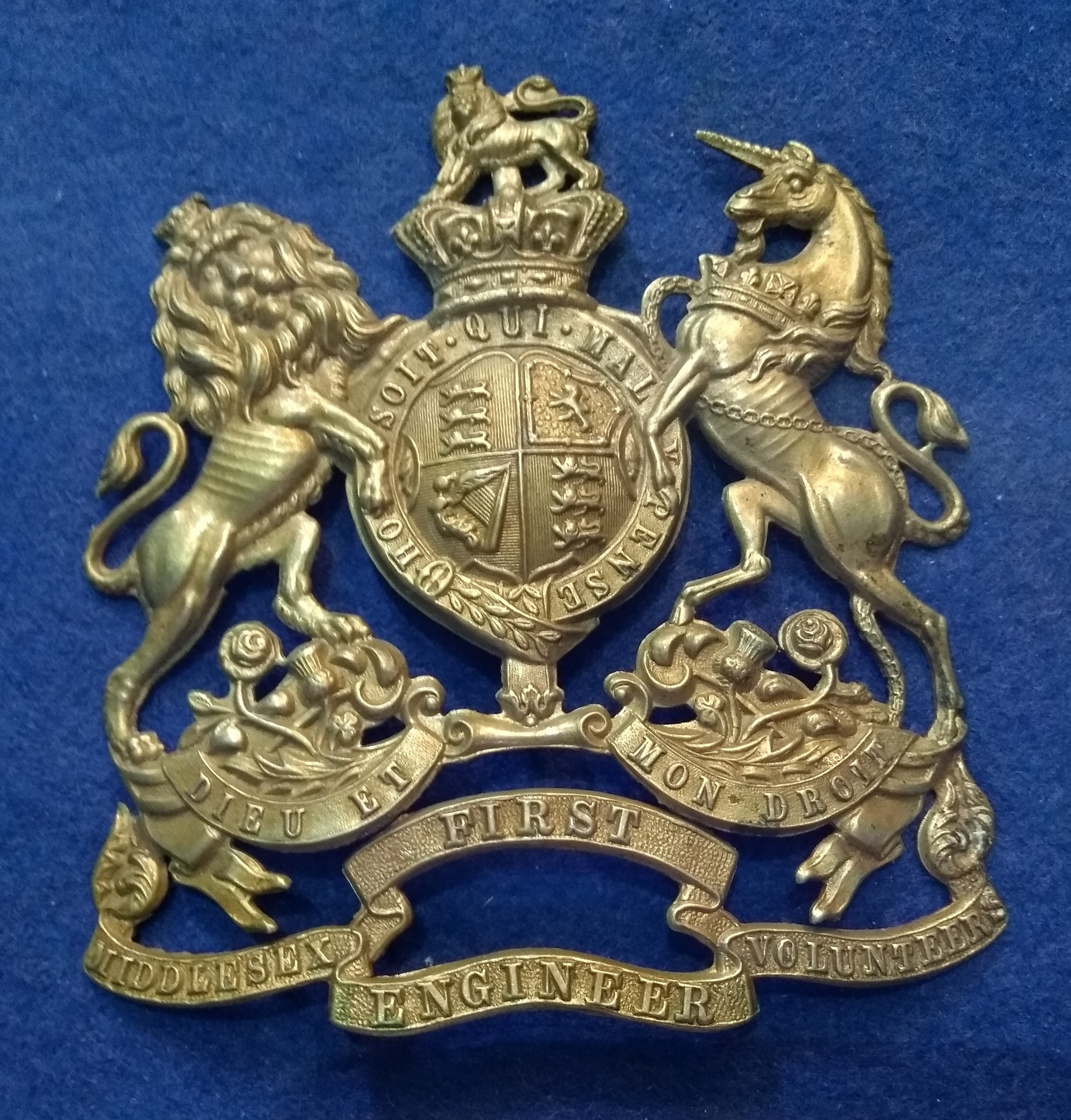
- Helmet Plate of the 1st Middlesex Engineer Volunteers
- Active: 1860–1967
- Country: United Kingdom
- Branch: Territorial Army
- Type: Field engineers
- Part of: 1st Middlesex Volunteers; 1st London Division/56th (London) Division; 2nd London Division/47th (London) Infantry Division; 47th (1/2nd London) Division; 60th (2/2nd London) Division 27 Engineer Group
- Garrison/HQ: Duke of York's Headquarters, Chelsea
- Nickname: '1st Mids'
- Engagements: Second Boer War; First World War: Loos; High Wood; Eaucourt l'Abbaye; Bourlon Wood; German spring offensive; Hundred Days Offensive; Doiran; Beersheba; Jerusalem; Megiddo; Second World War: France; Dunkirk; Tunisia; Operation Husky; Operation Avalanche; Anzio; Operation Olive; Argenta Gap; Operation Astonia; Operation Blackcock; Operation Veritable; Operation Plunder

Commanders
- Notable commanders: Colonel Norman MacLeod of MacLeod; Lieutenant-Colonel Sydney D'Aguilar Crookshank; Lieutenant-Colonel Christopher Thomson

The 1st Middlesex Engineers was the senior engineer unit of Britain's Volunteer Force, raised in 1860 and originally recruited from the South Kensington Museum. It provided Royal Engineers (RE) units to the 47th (1/2nd London) and 60th (2/2nd London) Divisions during World War I, and the 47th (London) and 56th (London) Infantry Divisions in World War II. The engineers served on the First World War's Western Front from 1915 to 1918, and in a number of theatres during the Second World War. It also served in the postwar Territorial Army, until 1967.

== Volunteer Force ==
The enthusiasm for the Volunteer movement following an invasion scare in 1859 saw the creation of many Rifle Volunteer units composed of part-time soldiers eager to supplement the Regular British Army in time of need. Soon the need for military engineer ('Sapper') units to support the Rifle Volunteers was recognised, and a group from the South Kensington Museum, headed by Norman MacLeod of MacLeod, approached the War Office (WO) with an offer to raise two companies from the engineering and allied professions. The proposal was accepted in January 1860 and enlistment began on 6 February, creating the first Engineer Volunteer Corps (EVC). MacLeod was appointed captain in command and a year later was promoted to major as the unit rapidly grew beyond its initial two companies. By November 1863, the 1st Middlesex EVC had 10 companies and was recruiting an 11th:

- Nos 1, 2, 3 & 5 Companies at South Kensington Museum
- No 4 Company at Chelsea
- No 6 Company at Wandsworth
- No 7 Company at London University
- No 8 Company at Brompton
- No 9 Company at Pimlico
- No 10 Company at Paddington
- No 11 Company at 69 Chancery Lane – from solicitors' clerks

From 1863, the new 1st Essex, 1st London and 1st Tower Hamlets EVCs were administratively linked to the 1st Middlesex (these units became independent from 1871, 1868 and 1868 respectively).

The unit outgrew its headquarters (HQ) at the South Kensington Museum and moved a short distance to Whitehead's Grove in Chelsea (it dropped its '(South Kensington)' subtitle in 1862) and in 1865 opened a purpose-built drill hall in College Street (today's Elystan Street) in Chelsea, designed by Capt Francis Fowke, RE, who had designed the new South Kensington Museum (the V&A). MacLeod relinquished command in 1871 and was appointed honorary colonel of the corps.

By the end of 1873, the corps had dwindled to 210 men in six companies and a recruiting campaign was held, which brought it back up to nine companies, including two (A and G) in Marylebone and one based at the Royal Indian Engineering College, Cooper's Hill, near Egham. When the 1st Sussex Engineers was raised in Eastbourne in 1890, it was attached to the 1st Middlesex until 1892, when it was transferred to the 1st Hampshires. The Tonbridge School Cadet Corps was affiliated with the 1st Middlesex in 1893. All the EVCs' titles were changed to simply 'Royal Engineers (Volunteers)' in 1896.

=== Active service ===
In 1882, the 1st Middlesex offered a detachment for service in the Egyptian Campaign of 1882, which was accepted. (Note: This detachment must have been very small: the RE History suggests that most of the 18 Volunteers on the campaign came from units in the North of England.)

After Black Week in December 1899, the Volunteers were invited to send active service units to assist the Regulars in the Second Boer War. The 1st Middlesex Engineers sent a detachment of one officer and 25 other ranks (ORs) to work with the Royal Engineers (RE). They embarked at Southampton aboard the Tintagel Castle with similar sections from 11 other EVCs on 10 March 1900. The ship arrived at Cape Town on 31 March. The detachments returned home after a year's service, but the 1st Middlesex sent a second detachment in 1901. Members of the 1st Middlesex also volunteered for other active service units, bringing the total of those who served in South Africa to two officers and 100 ORs, of whom five died.

== Territorial Force ==
When the Volunteers were subsumed into the new Territorial Force (TF) under the Haldane Reforms of 1908, the 1st Middlesex Engineers provided the divisional engineers for the TF's 2nd London Division (Note: Although the 1st Middlesex was the senior EVC, the 1st London Division was concentrated in central London and the Tower Hamlets Engineers were better located to be linked with that formation; the 2nd London Division was formed of suburban London units, several of which were headquartered in Chelsea.) with the following organisation:

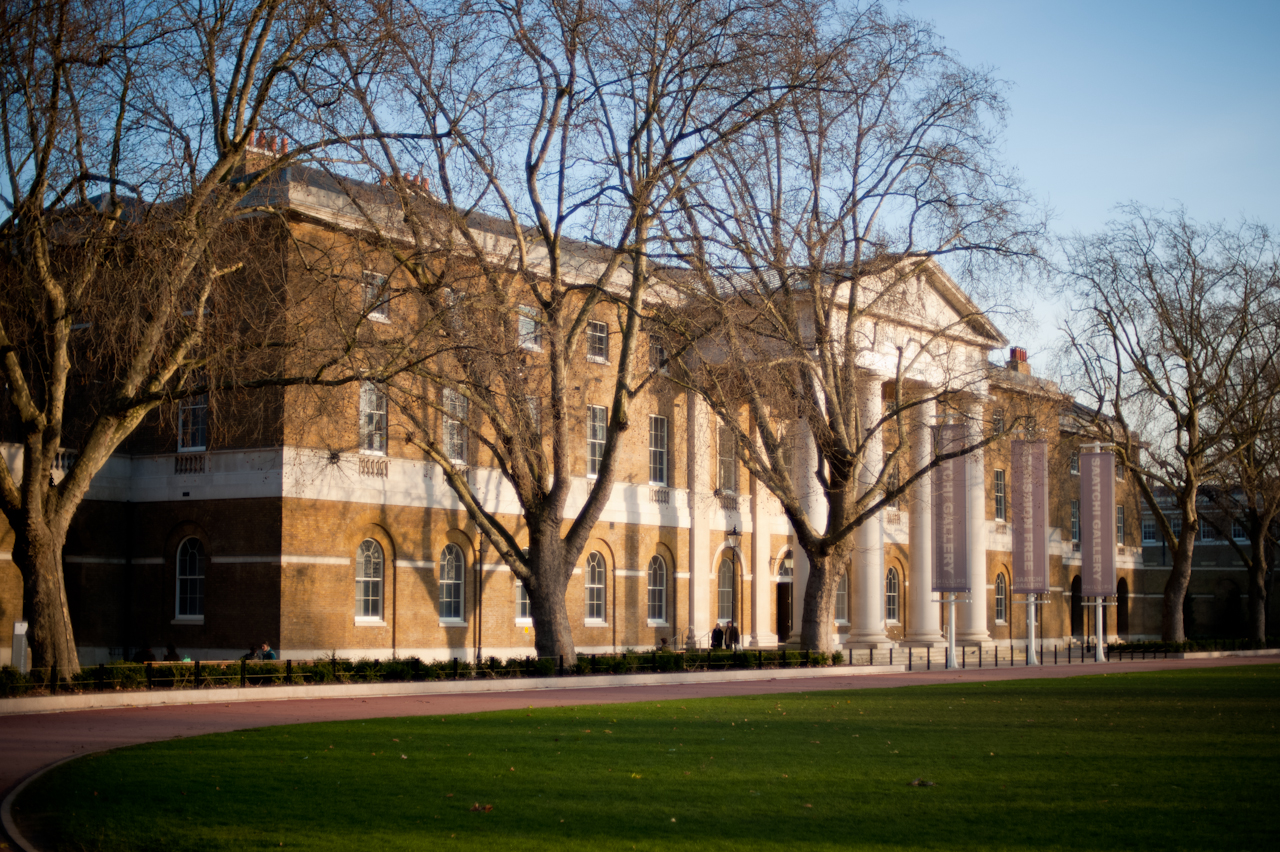
The former Duke of York's Headquarters in Chelsea, London.

- HQ at Duke of York's Headquarters (DOYHQ), Chelsea
- 3rd London Field Company
- 4th London Field Company
- 2nd London Divisional Telegraph Company
  - No 1 Section, Duke of York's Headquarters
  - No 2 (4th London) Section
  - No 3 (5th London) Section
  - No 4 (6th London) Section

Nos 2–4 Sections of the Telegraph Company were attached to and largely manned by the 4th–6th infantry brigades of the division. It was termed a Signal Company from 1911.

Tonbridge School Cadet Corps became part of the Junior Division of the Officers Training Corps, but the Royal Engineer Cadets (2nd London Division) continued to be affiliated to the unit.

== First World War ==
=== Mobilisation ===
When war was declared on 4 August 1914, most units of 2nd London Division had just reached camps at Perham Down to carry out annual training. They immediately returned to their HQs and mobilised. 3rd London Field Company went to Dover to carry out defence works, but by mid-August the whole division was concentrated at its war stations around St Albans. The Divisional Commander, RE (CRE) was Lieutenant-Colonel H.H. Taylor, who had his HQ at Gorhambury, 3rd Company was at Shafford's Farm, 4th Company at Gorhambury Park, and the Signal Company in billets in St Albans.

On the outbreak of war, TF units were invited to volunteer for Overseas Service. On 15 August 1914, the WO issued instructions to separate those men who had signed up for Home Service only, and form these into reserve units. On 31 August, the formation of a reserve or 2nd Line unit was authorised for each 1st Line unit where 60 per cent or more of the men had volunteered for Overseas Service. The titles of these 2nd Line units would be the same as the original, but distinguished by a '2/' prefix. In this way duplicate battalions, brigades and divisions were created, mirroring those TF formations being sent overseas. Later, the 2nd Line were prepared for overseas service and 3rd Line units were raised.

The WO also decided that each infantry division should have an additional RE field company, to allow one for each brigade. For 2nd London Divisional Engineers, this should have been the 1/6th London Company, but the 2/3rd Field Company had already been formed at Chelsea in October, and this took the place, so the 1/6th Company joined the 2/2nd London Division when it was formed. 2/3rd Field Co trained with the rest of the 2nd Line at St Albans until it was ready to go overseas.

=== 47th (1/2nd London) Divisional RE ===
Shortly after mobilisation, elements of 2nd London Division went to France independently to reinforce the BEF fighting on the Western Front: 1/3rd London Fd Co left for Winchester in January 1915 to join the newly formed 28th Division, composed mainly of Regular units brought back from Colonial garrisons. 28th Division embarked at Southampton 15–18 January and took its place in the line. The company suffered its first casualties, including the officer commanding (OC), Major S.D. Sewell, killed while working in the line in the Ypres Salient. However, 1/3rd London Fd Co returned to 2nd London Division on 6 April 1915, before 28th Division went into large-scale action.

1/2nd London Division was chosen as one of the first complete TF formations to join the BEF. It began its move on 8 March 1915 and, by 22 March, had concentrated in the Béthune area. From the formation of the 2nd Line, the 1st Line Signal Company was commanded by Major Sir Lionel Alexander, Bart, from 23rd Bn London Regiment (and originally the Grenadier Guards). Once in France, although 'vaguely' under the divisional CRE, the company usually came under the control of Corps HQ, while the sections were with their brigades. On 11 May the division was designated as 47th (2nd London) Division, and the RE as 47th (London) Divisional RE.

The division took over a section of the line near Festubert, and its infantry played a part in the Battle of Festubert. The sappers were engaged in improving trench systems, and suffered a steady trickle of casualties, including the OC of 1/4th London Fd Co, Major H.H.S. Marsh. 2/3rd London Field Company left St Albans on 22 June, embarked on the SS City of Dunkirk for Le Havre, and joined the rest of the divisional RE at Nœux-les-Mines.

==== Loos ====
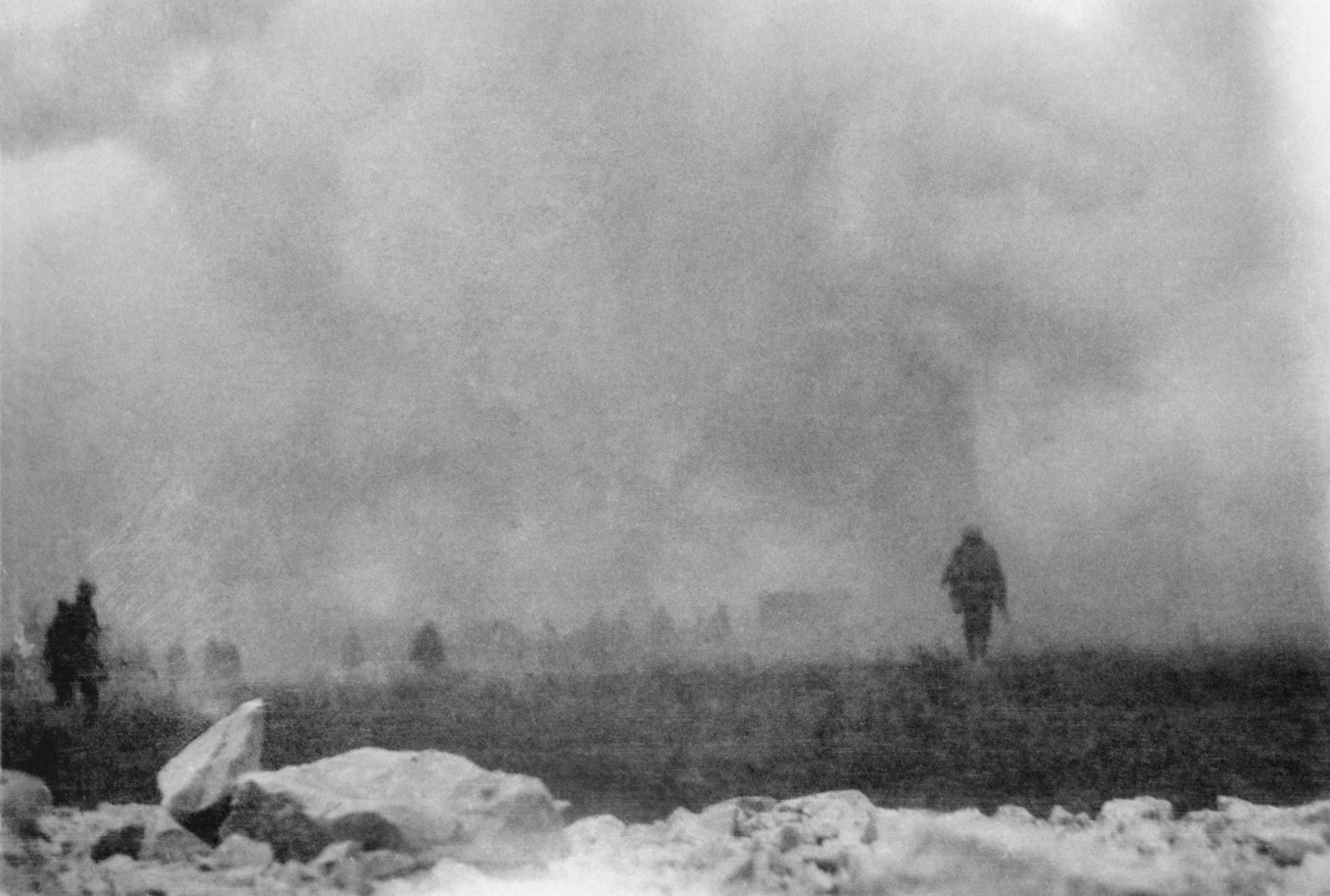
British troops advancing through the gas cloud at Loos, 25 September 1915.

The division's first major offensive action was the Battle of Loos.The front lines were opposite Loos-en-Gohelle and on 27 August the divisional RE began work on a new start line. Each night an infantry battalion was brought up from Nœux-les-Mines to dig under the supervision of the sappers, and 2 miles (3.2 km) of trenches were dug in three weeks, including special recesses for gas cylinders. At 06.30 on 25 September, after a 40-minute discharge of poison gas, the infantry of 47th Division 'went over the top' accompanied by parties of sappers. Two sections from 1/3rd Fd Co were with 140th (4th London) Brigade and two from 1/4th Fd Co were with 141st (5th London) Brigade; two more sections of 1/3rd Fd Co were with 142nd (6th London) Brigade, which was only to make a demonstration. The remainder of the Divisional RE was in reserve. Casualties in the attack were moderate, and the division's two attacking brigades took their objectives with the exception of one strongpoint where the Germans held out for 48 hours. Major E.B. Blogg, OC of 1/4th Fd Co, was awarded a Distinguished Service Order (DSO) after he went out under heavy shellfire to cut the electric leads to mines laid by the enemy under the church tower at Loos. However, the flanking divisions had not done as well, and 47th Division was forced to fight to hold onto its gains. After four days, the frontline brigades were relieved, while 142nd Bde relieved part of the Guards Division, and in turn spent three days in the line. During this period the brigade signal office in a Loos cellar was blown in, causing casualties, but communication back to Divisional HQ was restored in about 10 minutes/

Once the front line had settled down, signal lines were quickly laid from brigade HQs to battalion HQs and in some cases company HQs, while the motorcycle despatch riders (DRs) did good work on the exposed road into Loos. Maintaining communication from divisional HQ back to corps HQ proved more difficult, because wagon movements after dar continually disrupted the signal cables. The division was engaged on 8 October when heavy enemy counter-attacks were repulsed. IV Corps used 9000 Grenades in two-and-a-half hours, all of which had to be fused by the RE working under great pressure.

47th Division spent the winter of 1915–16 in the Loos salient, with the REs attempting to shore up trenches collapsing under incessant rain. The divisional RE built a new fire trench using Russian saps, but this was damaged by German mining. On 23 January, British tunnellers blew 'Harrison Crater', but this did much damage to the British trenches. In attempting to seize and consolidate the crater, 1/4th Fd Co suffered heavy casualties and had to be relieved by 2/3rd Fd Co. The crater was lost later after a German retaliatory mine was fired. On 15 February, the division was relieved and went into GHQ Reserve.

From March to July, the division was in the Vimy area, where there was intensive mining by both sides and the sappers were employed in consolidating the craters. Major Blogg was mortally wounded by a sniper in March and his successor was killed within a few days. On 3 May the British fired four mines north of 'Ersatz Avenue' trench forming three big craters, which were seized and consolidated by the 1/21st Londons and 2/3rd London Fd Co. One of these craters was named 'Love Crater' after Major Love, OC 2/3rd Fd Co. The crater lips gave splendid observation over the German lines. On 21 May, the Germans began an intensive bombardment of this area, extending into the British rear areas. The smoke and dust thrown up obscured observation for the British guns, and lachrymatory shells increased the confusion. After fours hours, the Germans fired a mine and attacked in overwhelming numbers: they 'had little more to do that take possession of the 140th Brigade sector'. The situation was so critical for a while that all three companies of 47th Divisional RE were brought up under the CRE, Lieutenant-Colonel Sydney D'Aguilar Crookshank, to man the trenches. In June, 1/19th Londons carried out a trench raid, accompanied by sappers from 1/4th London Fd Co carrying slabs of Gun-cotton to blow in dugouts.

==== High Wood ====
In August, the division moved to the Somme sector to join the British offensive, and began training for an attack at High Wood. This was made on 15 September, resulting in extremely heavy casualties; the RE went in with the attackers and 2/3rd London Fd Co were instrumental in consolidating the 'Starfish Line' after its capture on 18 September. 47th (2nd London) Division took part in further attacks on the Somme in October, capturing Eaucourt l'Abbaye before being relieved and sent to the Ypres Salient, where it spent the winter in trench warfare and raiding.

On 1 February 1917, all TF RE companies received numbers; in 47th Divisional RE they were assigned as follows:

- 1/3rd London Fd Co became 517th (1/3rd London)
- 1/4th London Fd Co became 518th (1/4th London)
- 2/3rd London Fd Co became 520th (2/3rd London)

On 20 February, a party from 520th Fd Co and 2nd Australian Tunnelling Company accompanied 1/6th Londons in a successful trench raid near Hill 60, but a similar raid next month by 1/18th Londons and a detachment of 517th Fd Co turned into a pitched battle with heavy casualties. The division took part in the Battle of Messines in June, when a deep penetration was made into the enemy position and the signal company quickly established communications. 47th (2nd L) Division then remained in the Ypres Salient, with the sappers working under shellfire to prepare tracks and railways for the resumption of the Third Ypres Offensive (the Battle of the Menin Road Ridge) in September.

==== Bourlon Wood ====
47th (2nd London) Division left the Ypres Salient on 21 September and travelled south to hold the line around Oppy and Gavrelle until November, where the infantry carried out a major trench raid on 4 November with RE demolition teams and signal parties in support. It then went to take over positions in Bourlon Wood that had been captured during the Battle of Cambrai. The relief was carried out under gas shelling, and on 30 November the division was hit by a fierce German counter-attack. Some of the RE acted as infantry reinforcing the hard-pressed 1/15th Londons, others as stretcher-bearers. After bitter fighting and heavy casualties, the division was ordered to retreat on the night of 4/5 December while the RE destroyed dugouts and equipment that could not be withdrawn, and the signallers recovered their cables. They were the last to leave the wood, blowing up the captured enemy guns that had not been taken away, and destroying the catacombs under Graincourt.

==== Spring Offensive ====
The German spring offensive broke on 47th Division's positions near Cambrai on 21 March 1918. Casualties were heavy, and the division was withdrawn that night, coordinated by the Signal Company's buried cable communications. It continued to be forced back the following day, and the field companies went into the line to reinforce the infantry, proving in the words of the divisional history 'that they were as good fighters as they were engineers'. On 24 March, the Germans threatened the retreat of the divisional transport, but the divisional RE and pioneer battalion defended the road until it could withdraw, causing heavy casualties to the attackers. By now, the division had no cable communications and had to rely on despatch riders: its OC, Major W.F. Bruce, took vital messages up to the brigade HQs in person, and was captured. The division crossed the Ancre on 25/26 March, and got one day's rest before going back to improve the defence line. On the night of 3/4 April a party of 518th Fd Co went out with an infantry fighting patrol to destroy Black Horse Bridge. On 5 April, the Germans made a heavy attack on the division, but were held after desperate fighting. 47th Division was finally relieved on 8/9 April.

==== Hundred Days ====
47th (2nd London) Division occupied a quiet part of the line until August while it rested and absorbed drafts, though there was plenty of work for the sappers digging new trenches and constructing concrete machine gun positions and dugouts. The division joined in the Allied Hundred Days Offensive on 22 August, meeting strong opposition, but captured its objectives after a night attack on 23/24 August. The advance continued from 31 August to 2 September. The CRE had his sappers and pioneers hard on the heels of the advancing infantry, who ended this phase by constructing crossings over the Canal du Nord.

By now, the division was very weak, and it was withdrawn to prepare to relieve another division from the Italian Front. However, the Germans on the Western Front were retreating quickly, and 47th (2nd L) Division was brought back to the line to hasten their departure. The RE spent much time repairing roads and bridges to allow the transport to keep up with the advance. The division masked Lille for 10 days and then took the outer forts with little opposition on 16 October. It took part in the official entry into the city on 28 October. On 8 November, the enemy evacuated Tournai, the sappers built footbridges over the Scheldt and began work on a heavy trestle bridge. The 1st Engineer Company of the Portuguese Army was attached to the division at this time. The Armistice with Germany took effect on 11 November, and the division concentrated round Tournai.

While awaiting demobilisation, the division repaired the Tournai–Ath railway, and then settled down into winter quarters around Béthune, where it had originally concentrated in 1915. The first parties left for England in early January, and by 28 March all the units had been reduced to cadre strength.

=== 60th (2/2nd London) Divisional RE ===
60th (2/2nd London) Division's formation sign.

Major R.Q. Henriques, OC of 4th London Field Company, was promoted to CRE of the 2/2nd Division and began recruiting at the Duke of York's HQ in early September 1914. The divisional RE particularly sought artisans and volunteers from various local engineering works and gained a number of recruits who had returned to the UK from engineering jobs overseas in order to volunteer. Training was carried out with borrowed tools and equipment. By November, four companies each of 250 men had been enlisted: 2/3rd, 3/3rd, 2/4th and 1/6th, of which the 2/3rd was despatched as the third field company for the 47th Division at St Albans (see above). At the new year, the division moved into billets in Surrey, with the RE companies at Nutfield, where they practised entrenching in a field. The whole division took part in digging anti-invasion defences along the Surrey Hills. In March 1915, the division had to send large drafts to bring the 1st Line division up to establishment before it proceeded overseas; a further vigorous recruiting campaign was therefore carried out. The 2/2nd London Division then took the place of the 1st Line in the St Albans area, with the RE at Radlett and Shenley. The division moved to Bishops Stortford in May, where training was pushed forward. In August 1915, the division was numbered as 60th (2/2nd London) Division.

In January 1916, the 60th Division moved to the Warminster training area on Salisbury Plain, based at Sutton Veny. It built a complete trench system and practised trench warfare. On 24 April, a warning order to proceed overseas was received and, on 21 June, the division began embarking for Le Havre, concentrating near Arras on 29 June. From now on, the field companies generally accompanied the infantry brigades: 2/4th with 179th (2/4th London) Brigade, 1/6th with 180th (2/5th London), and 3/3rd with 181st (2/6th London).

The division was attached to 51st (Highland) Division for its introduction to trench warfare, and then took over the line on its on account in mid-July. The whole area was overlooked by the enemy on Vimy Ridge and was honeycombed with mine galleries and mine craters. Fresh mines were regularly blown, each followed by a fight over possession of the crater lips involving both infantry and sappers. The division was also active in trench raiding. Autumn rains damaged the trenches and created much work for the sappers.

==== Salonika ====
60th (2/2nd London) Division had been earmarked to join in the Somme Offensive, but instead was switched to the Macedonian front. This required the RE companies to reorganise with pack mule transport rather than horse-drawn wagons. The CRE and 2/4th Fd Co left in the first ship from Marseille, SS Translyvania, and reached Salonika with 179th Bde on 30 November. The rest of the division followed by mid-December, while 179th Bde and 2/4th Fd Co were sent to guard the southwestern approaches to Salonika: the sappers had to repair the railway to allow their train to proceed. The company then spent the next three months constructing a pier at Skala Vromeria, defences to cover the Petra Pass, and the requisite roads including 'Chelsea Bridge' (built by 2/4th Fd Co and a working party of the 2nd London Scottish). At the end of 1916, the rest of the divisional RE moved up to the main line, 1/6th Fd Co joining 180th Bde south of Lake Doiran, 3/3rd Fd Co and 181 Bde arriving last, east of the Lake.

The field companies in 60th Divisional RE were now assigned numbers as follows:

- 3/3rd London Fd Co became 519th (3/3rd London) on 5 February
- 2/4th London Fd Co became 521st (2/4th London) on 7 February
- 1/6th London Fd Co became 522nd (1/6th London) on 1 February

On the Doiran front, 60th Division began a policy of vigorous raiding of Bulgarian outposts. For example, on the evening of 17 February, 181st Bde attacked the village of Brest, evicting the garrison and holding it all night while an RE demolition party rendered it untenable. Each time the Bulgarians repaired the defences, the brigade raided Brest and the Hodza Redoubt, taking prisoners and causing destruction. At the end of March, 179 Bde and 521st Fd Co rejoined the division, which took up new positions for the opening of the Spring offensive.

On 5 April, German Gotha bombers raided Karasuli, catching a column of waggons waiting to load up with RE stores: only one man was wounded but all the waggons and mules were destroyed. The Allies launched their offensive (the Battle of Doiran at the end of April, with 60th Division carrying out a diversionary raid on the night of 24/25 April against 'The Nose'. The infantry of 2/20th Londons were accompanied by sappers of 519th Fd Co carrying Bangalore torpedoes to breach the barbed wire. They were caught by searchlights while negotiating the gaps in the wire, and only one party was able to dash through into the Bulgarian trenches. Here, they fought off counter-attacks while the sappers carried out demolitions before withdrawing; casualties were severe. For the second phase of the battle, on 8/9 May, 179th Bde carried out a surprise attack accompanied by 521st Fd Co. All five objectives were taken without serious resistance, and the gains were extended the following morning and then counter-attacks were beaten back on 10 May while the sappers and pioneers consolidated the ground won.

==== Palestine ====
The fighting died down in later May and, on 1 June, 60th Division was given new orders: it was to re-embark on 12 June, bound for Egypt to reinforce the Egyptian Expeditionary Force (EEF). After arriving in Alexandria on 3 July, the engineers had to reorganise for wheeled and camel transport, followed by desert training. Lieutenant-Colonel C.B. Thomson took over as CRE on 27 August. On 30 October, the 60th Division concentrated for the Third Battle of Gaza and took part in the attack on Beersheba the following day. The division advanced with two brigades (179th and 181st), each accompanied by its field company, the third field company being held ready to move into Beersheba at short notice. The town fell to the Desert Mounted Corps, and 519th and 521st Fd Cos entered the town to get the water supply going: only two of 17 wells had been destroyed, though the remainder were prepared for demolition. The Sheria position, with its water supply, was taken on 6–7 November after a 15 miles (24 km) march across the desert and a pre-dawn attack, and Huj was taken on 8 November.

After a rest, the division marched again in the operation to capture Jerusalem, advancing on 8 December with 179th Bde and a section of 521st Fd Co leading the attack on the right, 180th Bde with 519th Fd Co on the left, and 181st Bde and 522nd Fd Co in reserve. As 179th Bde's columns advanced, RE parties with pioneers were dropped off at intervals to improve the muddy track and direct the follow-up troops. Despite bad weather, the attacks were successful in driving back the Turks and, on 9 December, the city's civilian leaders surrendered it to two sergeants of 2/19th Londons. The division then had to defend its gains against fierce Turkish counter-attacks (22–28 December) before resuming its advance to positions from which it could cover the city during the next pause in operations.

Early in February, the division began advancing on Jericho, advancing as three independent brigade groups with their usual RE companies attached (the RE detachment with 180th Bde in the centre was specially tasked with repairing culverts). After preliminary moves on 14 February, the brigades attacked on 18 February and by 21 February had fought their way over very bad ground to within 7 miles (11 km) of Jericho, and the town was captured next day by the ANZAC Mounted Division.

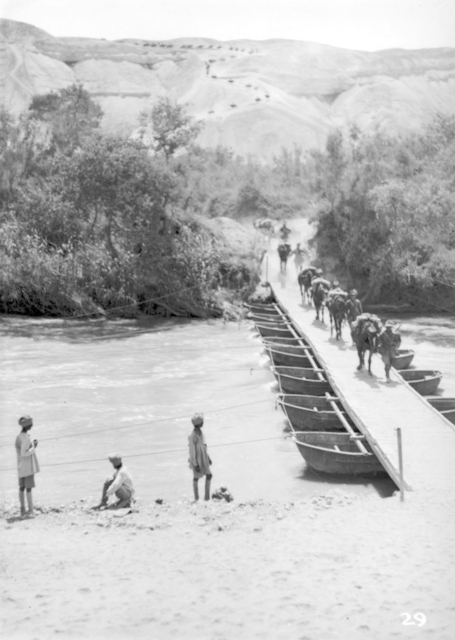
Units returning from the second Transjordan raid crossing the pontoon bridge at El Auja.

60th Division was now tasked with crossing the River Jordan in order to raid the enemy's communications around Amman: it was to cross at Ghoraniyeh, one of two bridging sites that had been identified. 521st Field Co extemporised rafts of timber, wire netting and tarpaulin to get infantry across and then form the basis for an infantry assault bridge. However, the floodwater prevented them being launched on the nights of 21/22 or 22/23 March. The first infantry only got across on 23 March after the Anzacs had already crossed, 521st's assault bridge then being quickly followed by a barrel pier constructed by 519th Fd Co and by a pontoon bridge by the army's bridging train. 522nd Field Co then began to build a heavy timber trestle bridge on 25 March, but the rising floodwater caused this to be abandoned on 29 March. Instead, 522 Fd Co built a suspension bridge between 1 and 18 April after cables had been brought from Egypt. A second raid lasting from 30 April to 4 May was launched from this bridgehead.

The EEF now had to provide urgent reinforcements to counter the German Spring Offensive on the Western Front. 60th Division was 'Indianised' and about three-quarters of its London infantry battalions went to France, to be replaced with Indian Army units. In the Divisional RE, 522nd Fd Co went to 7th (Meerut) Division on 18 July 1918, and No 1 Company, King George V's Own Bengal Sappers and Miners joined in exchange.

==== Megiddo ====
The final offensive in Palestine (the Battle of Megiddo) began on 19 September, with 60th and 7th (Meerut) Divisions rapidly breaking through along the coastal plain to capture Tulkarm and Tabsor respectively, opening a gap for the cavalry to exploit.

The pursuit after the battle was a cavalry affair, and 60th Division was left behind on battlefield salvage work, while 7th (Meerut) Division participated in the advance across the Jordan to Baalbek. The Armistice with Turkey came into force on 31 October. By 26 November, the whole of 60th Division was back in Alexandria, where the RE carried out various engineering tasks while demobilisation got under way. At one point, 519th Fd Co was put under orders to proceed to Russia, but these were cancelled. Units were progressively reduced to cadre, and the division was disbanded on 31 May 1919. 7th (Meerut) Division remained as part of the occupation force in Palestine until its units were dispersed in 1920.

=== 3/2nd London Engineers ===
Once it became clear that the 2/2nd London Division would be sent overseas, its units began forming a 3rd Line to continue the role of training reinforcement drafts for overseas service and to take over the men who had enlisted for Home Service only. In mid-1915, the 3/2nd London Divisional Engineers came into being at Chelsea, with the 2/6th, 3/4th and 4/3rd London Field Companies and the 3/2nd London Signal Company. They moved for training to Sandown Park Racecourse, with the 3/1st London Divisional Engineers billeted nearby. 3/2nd Signal Company then moved a short way to join other signal units for specialist training at Oatlands Park, with Company HQ at Stafford Lodge and the cable wagons and horses in the stables of the Oatlands Park Hotel. Early on, the strength of the 3rd Line units was fairly high, but significant numbers of officers and NCOs were detached on the staff, as clerks or as draughtsmen, and there was continual turnover of personnel as drafts were sent to the 1st and 2nd Lines and others posted back to Home Establishment. In February 1917, in common with the rest of the TF RE units, the field companies were numbered:

- 2/6th London Fd Co became 523rd (2/6th London)
- 3/4th London Fd Co became 524th (3/4th London)
- 4/3rd London Fd Co became 525th (4/3rd London)

At the end of 1917, Sandown Park was required for other purposes, so the units moved to houses nearby, and the sappers practised dry bridging and field works in Oxshott Woods, with attachments to Brightlingsea for wet bridging and pontoon work. By Christmas 1917, the demand for drafts had depleted the units, which were reduced to a single company (525th Reserve Fd Co). This in turn was disbanded in early 1918, with a final draft of 140 sappers being sent to France and all remaining horse transport drivers being sent to the RE depot at Aldershot.

== Interwar years ==
47th (2nd London) Division began to reform at home on 16 February 1920. At first, the divisional RE was to reform as two battalions: 3 and 4 Bns (2 London), then only 3 Bn was proceeded with. When the TF was reconstituted as the Territorial Army (TA) in 1921, the battalion idea was dropped and the divisional RE adopted the following organisation:

- 220 (2nd London) Field Company
- 221 (2nd London) Field Company
- 222 (2nd London) Field Company
- 223 (2nd London) Field Park Company – absorbed into Divisional RE HQ on 1 May 1924

The signal company transferred to the new Royal Corps of Signals as 47th (2nd London) Divisional Signals.

In the coal strike of April 1921, a Defence Force was formed, drawing its personnel from the TA, many of whom did not rejoin the unit after the political crisis had ended. Recruitment was also hampered by the migration of working Londoners away from Chelsea. Mechanisation of the unit began in 1934.

To meet the growing threat of air attack, a number of TA units began to be converted to the anti-aircraft (AA) role during the 1930s. On 16 December 1935, 47th (2nd London) Divisional HQ was redesignated 1st AA Division, and a number of London infantry battalions were converted. The remaining battalions and the divisional assets were pooled under 56th (1st London) Divisional HQ, which became simply the London Division; 47th Division provided the divisional RE of the merged formation.

== Second World War ==
=== Mobilisation ===
Following the Munich Crisis, the TA was doubled in size. As a result, the London Division became the 1st London Division and created the 2nd London Division in August 1939. These two formations would be renumbered as the 56th (London) and 47th (London), respectfully. Their RE organised as follows:

1st London Divisional RE

- 220 (2nd London) Field Company – at Chelsea
- 221 (2nd London) Field Company – at Chelsea; became independent later in 1939; to I Corps
- 222 (2nd London) Field Company – at Chelsea; became independent later in 1939; to II Corps
- 223 (London) Field Park Company – reformed at Chelsea 1939; to BEF; later to London defences
- 501 (London) Field Company – from 2nd London Division 7 September 1939
- 563 Field Park Company – formed 15 January 1940, including 223 Fd Park Co's bridging section and transfers from 220 and 501 Fd Cos

2nd London Divisional RE

- 501 (London) Field Company – formed at Chelsea, to 1st London Division 7 Sep 1939
- 502 (London) Field Company – formed at New Barnet
- 503 (London) Field Company – formed at New Barnet
- 504 (London) Field Park Company – formed at New Barnet

=== Battle of France ===
1st London Division was not sent to join the new British Expeditionary Force (BEF) in France, but most of its divisional RE went independently and did serve in the Battle of France: 221 Fd Co joined I Corps Troops, Royal Engineers (I CTRE) and 222 Fd Co joined II CTRE, while 223 Fd Park Co (less its bridging section) was with Force X, a group of TA RE units working on the BEF's lines of communication.

The three companies mobilised at Hurst Park Racecourse and then embarked for France in October 1939. The engineers spent the Phoney War period working on defensive positions. 223 Field Park Co with Force X was building reinforced concrete pillboxes along the Franco-Belgian frontier. I CTRE attached 221 Fd Co to 1st Division as an additional field company. Its role on the outbreak of hostilities, in conjunction with 1st Division's bridging section, was to open the road from Tournai to Brussels and maintain an important canal crossing. When the German offensive in the west opened on 10 May 1940, the BEF abandoned the frontier defences and advanced into Belgium in accordance with 'Plan D'. 221 Field Co found itself in the lead, advancing ahead of the scouting armoured cars. Similarly, 222 Field Co had been assigned by II CTRE to assist 3rd Division and went forward to blow the Dyle bridges round Louvain.

Shortly afterwards, the German Army broke through the Ardennes to the east, forcing the BEF to withdraw again, and by 19 May the whole force was back across the Escaut and then went back to the so-called 'Canal Line'. 221 Field Co was tasked with destroying bridges along a 10 km stretch of the Brussels–Charleroi Canal to delay the German advance, then to prepare a 'stop line' on the La Bassée Canal. 222 Field Co also fell back, destroying bridges as it went.

During the retreat to the Escaut, a dangerous gap opened up between the BEF and the French to the south. The GHQ assembled a scratch force at Orchies to fill this gap under the command of the Director of Military Intelligence, Major-General Noel Mason-MacFarlane, and known as 'Macforce'. It was formed around 127th (Manchester) Brigade with some artillery and supporting services; 223 Fd Pk Co was assigned from X Force to Macforce, working on emergency defences. By 23 May, the French had filled the dangerous gap in the line, so Macforce was shifted north to the Forest of Nieppe to extend the Canal Line.

By 26 May, the BEF was cut off and the decision was made to evacuate it through Dunkirk (Operation Dynamo), with II Corps acting as flank guard against the German penetration where the Belgian Army had surrendered, and I Corps acting as rearguard, its sappers blowing bridges and cratering roads to form a defensive perimeter

221 Field Co moved down to Dunkirk and destroyed its vehicles and stores before boarding a variety of vessels. One party was on the Queen of the Channel, which was bombed and sunk on 28 May: the passengers and crew were picked up and taken to England aboard the Dorrien Rose. Another party from the company arrived the following day on HMS Greyhound. 222 Field Co reached Bray-Dunes on 30 May and also embarked on several vessels, most on HMS Calcutta, which landed them at Sheerness next day, the OC's party and several field park personnel aboard HMS Halcyon, which landed them at Dover. 223 Field Park Co was evacuated in small parties from the open beaches east of Dunkirk.

=== 56th (London) Divisional RE ===
56th (London) Division's formation sign.

Apart from a composite section from 220 and 501 Fd Cos that saw action in the Norwegian Campaign, the divisional engineers had been training round Tunbridge Wells in Kent during the winter. They moved to Tenterden in May, and after the Dunkirk evacuation were engaged in constructing anti-invasion defences along the South Coast. 221 Field Co reassembled under I CTRE at Newark, but in June 1st London was converted from a motor to an infantry division, and required a third field company, so 221 rejoined.

1st London Division held the critical south-east corner of England throughout the period of greatest invasion threat. The divisional engineers worked closely with the Petroleum Warfare Department, installing flame installations on beaches at Dumpton Gap and Deal. 563 Field Park Co built the first flame-projector mounted on a Universal Carrier, which was later developed into the 'Wasp' and the Churchill Crocodile. On 18 November 1st London Division was redesignated 56th (London) Division.

From November 1940, 56th (L) Division alternated with 43rd (Wessex) Infantry Division, being based at Maidstone and the Medway towns until February 1941 and then again from June. In November 1941 the division drove through London to join XI Corps in East Anglia. The division was now fully equipped and undergoing intensive training. In May 1942, the divisional RE attended a bridging camp at Wallingford, Oxfordshire, and in June the division was ordered to mobilise for overseas service.

==== Middle East ====
During August 1942, the division moved to the embarkation ports of Liverpool and Glasgow, and sailed for the Middle East on 25 August. The fast troop convoy reached South Africa safely, but the slow convoy carrying guns and vehicles was heavily attacked by U-boats off the coast of West Africa and lost several ships. From South Africa most of the troops sailed to Bombay, while the RE drivers were sent to Egypt to collect the vehicles that had escaped the U-boats, which arrived at Suez in December. The main body sailed from Bombay to Basra in Iraq on 4 November and then by road and rail to Kirkuk where they were joined by the drivers who had brought the transport overland from Suez.

56th Divisional RE spent the spring of 1943 training for mountain warfare, particularly bridging ravines. In March, 168th (2nd London) Brigade accompanied by 501 Fd Co was detached to Palestine. Then the rest of the division began an overland drive to join Eighth Army in Tunisia, driving some 3,200 miles (5,100 km) between 18 March and 19 April. An advanced party of RE officers and NCOs had gone forward earlier (covering 1,330 miles (2,140 km) in four days) to be attached to 51st (Highland) Infantry Division for battle experience.

==== Tunisia ====
On 22 April, 201 Guards Motor Brigade joined the division as temporary replacement for 168 Bde, bringing with it 42 Fd Co, which became part of divisional RE for the rest of the year. Next day 56th (London) Division went into action for the first time at Enfidaville. The infantry were roughly handled, and the divisional RE suffered its first casualties, from shellfire and mines. The final attack on Tunis (Operation Strike) began on 6 May, the division meeting strong resistance before the Germans surrendered on 12 May. 56th Divisional RE built its first operational bridge (a Small Box Girder (SBG) bridge) just before the end of the fighting. By the end of the month division had been pulled back to Tripoli to train for the invasion of Italy. Divisional RE lost 10 men to an accident with Bangalore torpedoes, while Sapper Robert Southall of 221 Fd Co won a George Medal for gallantry while clearing mines.

==== Sicily ====
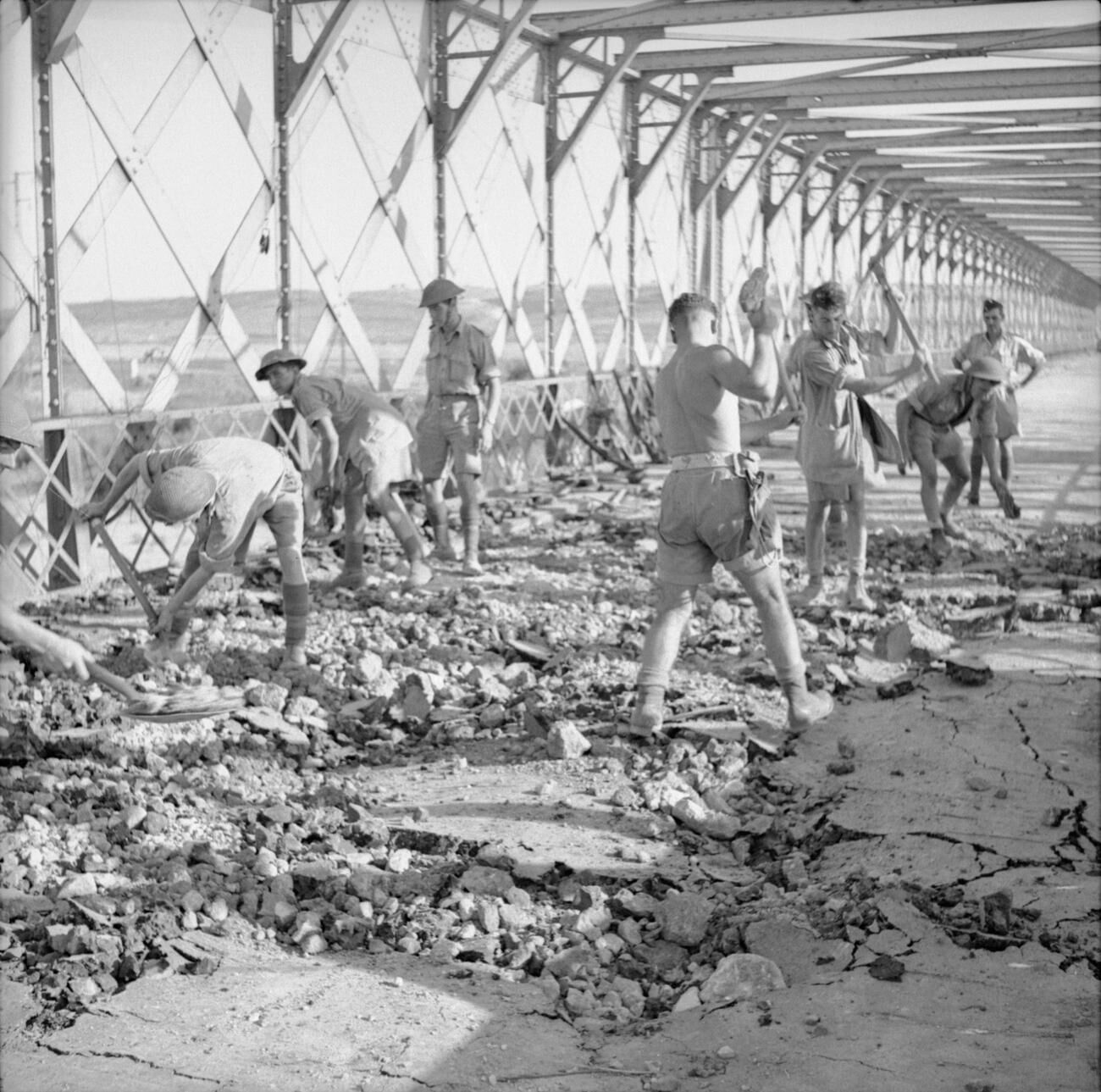
RE sappers repairing Primosole Bridge after its final capture, July 1943.

While the rest of 56th (London) Division trained for the assault on mainland Italy, 168 Bde and 501 Fd Co took a leading part in the Allied invasion of Sicily (Operation Husky) with 50th (Northumbrian) Infantry Division. The company had trained at the Combined Operations Training Centre at the Great Bitter Lake in Egypt, then sailed in convoy from Alexandria. 168 Brigade Group landed on 13 July (D+3), after the rest of the division had taken its objectives; 501 Fd Co disembarked dryshod on the quay at Syracuse. The company was involved in 168 Bde's failed night attack beyond Primosole Bridge on 17/18 July, and later built a Folding Boat Equipment (FBE) bridge across the River Dittano there. It was then set to clearing mines and suffered several casualties. The retreating Germans had destroyed the cliff road at Taormina, and while XXX Corps Troops, Royal Engineers bridged the gap and a tunnelling company of the Royal Canadian Engineers excavated the cliff, 2 and 3 Platoons of 501 Fd Co were tasked with mine clearance on the beach below. While reconnoitring forward they became involved in a firefight with a German patrol. The other two platoons were landed north of Taormina to begin clearance from the other side. 50th (N) Division reached Messina on 17 August, when 168 Bde Group left the division. 501 Field Co constructed an SBG bridge and prepared launching points for the assault crossing of the Straits of Messina (Operation Baytown) on 3 September. After the beachhead had been secured and Eighth Army began driving north, 168 Bde and 510 Fd Co crossed over to travel overland to rejoin 56th (L) Division, which had landed at Salerno on 9 September.

==== Operation Avalanche ====
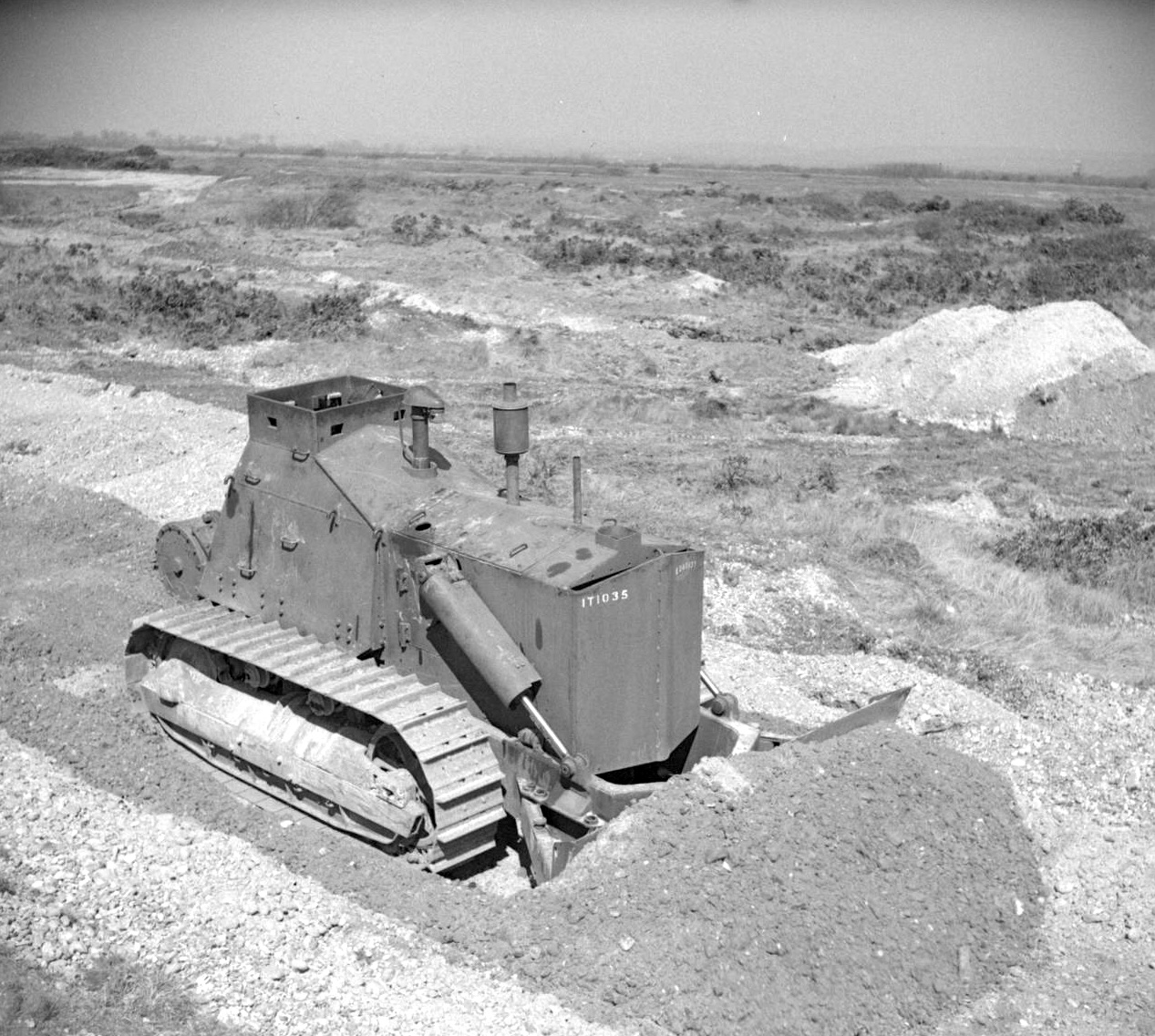
D7 Armoured bulldozer.

56th (London) Division landed as the right hand half of X Corps at Salerno before dawn on 9 September 1943 in Operation Avalanche. There were few beach defences, but once ashore there was plenty of work for the sappers. 503 (London) Fd Co (see below) was also present with one of the beach groups landed immediately after the first infantry waves. Bulldozer drivers from 220 Fd Co towed out seven bogged-down Sherman tanks of the Royal Scots Greys on the first morning. 221 Field Co sent a party to Montecorvino Airfield to disarm suspected demolition charges, but got involved in a firefight: the airfield was not fully cleared for several days. 563 Field Park Co came ashore during the morning and had a stores dump organised by evening. Sapper F. Martin of 563 Fd Park Co won a Military Medal (MM) for his work with a D7 armoured bulldozer, during which he was badly wounded. There was bitter fighting for 10 days along the Salerno beachhead: on 12 September 220 Fd Co took up defensive positions with its brigade when a German counter-attack threatened to break through, and on 14 September both 220 and 221 Fd Cos acted as infantry and took heavy casualties.

On 22 September, the Allies broke out and X Corps headed north towards Naples. Meanwhile, the divisional reconnaissance unit (44th Reconnaissance Regiment) sent a mixed pursuit force, including a platoon of 220 Fd Co, eastward along Highway 18 to make contact with Eighth Army advancing from the south. It was held up by demolitions at Battipaglia, so 220 Fd Co built the first Bailey bridge on this front. There was another blown bridge 5 miles (8.0 km) further on, so 220 Fd Co constructed a bypass while 221 Fd Co began work on a second Bailey bridge. On X Corps' main axis of advance over the Sorrento Peninsula, another platoon of 220 worked 'feverishly' to repair a damaged mountain road, and road clearance and repair became a major job as the force advanced across the plain of Naples. The retreating Germans had blown every bridge across the River Sarno for 8 miles (13 km) inland, but 56th Division captured an intact bridge at San Mauro and continued past Naples to Capua, where the Germans were making a stand on the River Volturno.

==== Volturno and Garigliano ====
The attempt to cross the Volturno began with a feint attack at Capua by 201 Guards Bde using assault boats, which was repulsed, but the neighbouring divisions got across, and 56th (L) crossed by a US-built bridge. The RE then set to work to build additional bridges, the main one being a Class 30 (30 ton load) Bailey pontoon, the first of its kind to be built operationally under fire, and something 56th Divisional Engineers had never tackled before. It became a joint effort of 220 Fd Co, 270 Fd Co from 46th Division and a corps RE company. 168 Bde Group, including 501 Fd Co, rejoined 56th (L) Division at Caserta during these operations. After the Volturno, X Corps made rapid progress up Highway 6 until it reached the Bernhardt Line in the mountains round Monte Camino. The sappers built jeep tracks through the mountains, but there was bitter fighting on Monte Camino itself that lasted until its capture on 9 December, when the division was rested.

The next obstacle in front of X Corps was the lower Garigliano river south of Monte Cassino. 56th (London) Division's attack on the night of 17 January launched the Battle of Monte Cassino. Many assault boats were sunk in the crossing, but the divisional RE built and operated rafts of varying types: 501 Fd Co providing a Class 40 Bailey pontoon ferry powered by eight outboard motors, which operated for a week without being hit by the enemy's accurate mortar fire. Two nights later construction began on a Class 40 Bailey pontoon bridge, which was completed by the evening of 20 January. However, fierce counter-attacks prevented X Corps from advancing far beyond the river.

==== Anzio ====
On 30 January, 168 Bde (with 501 Fd Co) was about to resume the offensive on the Garigliano when it was hurriedly withdrawn to reinforce the landing further up the coast at Anzio, which had run into trouble. On 6 February, the rest of 56th Division (less 201 Gds Bde and 42 Fd Co, which now left the division) was also withdrawn from the Gariglianao and landed as reinforcements at Anzio. Much of the work for the sappers consisted of repairing roads in the bridgehead, including quarrying the necessary stone, all under heavy artillery and air bombardment. There was also a programme of laying defensive wire and minefields. The infantry were continually engaged and, by 25 February, were down to less than half strength, so the engineers had to go into the fighting line while enemy counter-attacks were repulsed. On 9 March, the exhausted division and 501 Fd Co were evacuated from Anzio, but 220 and 221 Fd Cos remained behind working on roads and quarrying until 18 March.

56th Division now went back to Egypt for rest. While driving south to Taranto to embark, the divisional engineers spent a day bulldozing the road clear of volcanic ash from the eruption of Mount Vesuvius. On arrival at Port Said, the division went into camp, leave was granted, and RE training resumed at various locations in Palestine and Syria. On 10 July, the refitted division left Port Said to return to Taranto, from where it was sent to join V Corps with Eighth Army on the Adriatic coast of Italy.

==== Gothic Line ====
Massive engineering works were required in preparation for Eighth Army's assault on the Gothic Line (Operation Olive), including opening up two heavily demolished roads and erecting 40 separate Bailey bridges, of which 220 and 510 Fd Cos built one apiece near Pergola. V Corps opened the attack on 25 August, and by 1 September the Gothic Line had been cracked open, but 56th (L) Division coming up from reserve still had hard fighting at Monte Capello, Montefiore Conca village and the Gemmano ridge. During the Battle of Gemmano one RE bulldozer was forced by a German counter-attack to retreat down the ridge at speed, towing out a bogged jeep ambulance as it went. Eventually, 56th (L) Division bypassed the Gemmano ridge and crossed the Conca river, and finally took Gemmano village on 9 September. After a short rest, the division advanced on 16 September and fought its way to the swollen Fiumicino river by the beginning of October. At Savignano, 501 Fd Co built a major bridge nicknamed 'Itsonitsoff' because the operation was 'on' and 'off' so many times during the week of fighting to secure the bridging site. By 7 October, 56th (L) Division was exhausted and withdrawn, together with 563 Fd Park Co, while the field companies and 563's bridging platoon remained working in the line a few days longer.

==== Argenta Gap ====
In the middle of December, the division returned to the line, moving via Forlì to Faenza, where it spent the winter months, divisional RE working on road maintenance, mine clearance, and repairing the floodbanks of the River Lamone. For 56th (L) Division the Spring 1945 offensive in Italy began on 5 April with an operation to clear a triangle of ground between the River Reno and the south-west corner of Comacchio Lagoon. 220 Field Co built a Class 40 and a Class 12 raft at dusk, ready to be towed into position, when No 1 Platoon would cross with the infantry. Then, 221 and 501 Fd Cos were to build a Bailey pontoon bridge at dawn the following day. The infantry assault went in at 23.00 and early on 6 April a tug pulled the Class 40 raft up, to be loaded with a bulldozer. Unfortunately there were still Germans dug in on the far bank, who sank the raft with an anti-tank (A/T) rocket, the dozer driver being drowned. In the subsequent firefight and recovery attempts led by the CRE, Lieutenant-Colonel R.E.C. Hughes, the OCs of 220, 501 and 563 Cos, and the Regimental Sergeant Major all became casualties. After a tank shelled the Germans, the post surrendered to Lieutenant-Colonel Hughes. The sappers then cleared dozens of mines from the approaches to allow the 282 feet (86 m) pontoon bridge to be built.

On the night of 10/11 April, 56th Division launched Operation Impact Plain to widen the bridgehead and open the 'Argenta Gap', for which the divisional RE had been reinforced by a company of the African Pioneer Corps and by Royal Army Service Corps troops transporting bridging equipment and dozers, and driving tipper lorries. Prior to the assault, 56th Divisional RE built two Bailey bridges to allow amphibious LVTs known as 'Fantails' to reach their assembly area, then following behind the advance built several bridges across the network of irrigation and drainage canals. On 15 April, 501 Fd Co put up a 160 feet (49 m) FBE bridge and 221 Fd Co a 70 feet (21 m) Bailey. 56th Division renewed the attack that day, and on 16 April it took Bastia in Operation Impact Royal. However, it was held up at the Marina Canal. During 17 April, 501 Fd Co was employed making a diversion route across country to the canal. Next day, the divisional RE began to dam the canal, but handed the work over to 8th Army Troops RE in order to keep up with its division as the advance accelerated.

On 25 April, the division reached the River Po. This was a formidable obstacle, but 56th (L) Division planned to make an assault crossing that night using LVTs and storm boats, while 220 and 221 Fd Cos built and operated three Class 9 close support rafts and two Class 40 rafts; there was also a Class 50/60 raft built and operated by H Assault Squadron of 2nd Armoured Regiment, RE. 501 Field Co supported 169 Bde in the assault and built ramps for the LVTs. In the event the infantry got across by storm boat in the afternoon to occupy Crespino, and the river assault after nightfall was almost unopposed. The Class 50/60 raft had arrived without motors, so the engines from close support rafts had to be used for it, reducing the number available.

The division pushed on to the Adige, where 501 Fd Co found a suitable bridging site near Rovigo and began a 392 feet (119 m) pontoon Bailey, which it then handed over to 221 Fd Co and 564 Fd Co of V Corps Troops RE for completion. 56th (London) Division and 2nd New Zealand Division were given the task of capturing Venice, which they did on 28 April after a brief action. The war in Italy ended on 2 May with the Surrender of Caserta.

56th (London) Divisional RE remained in the area of Trieste and Pula, building camps, frontier posts and hospitals, until they were disbanded in the summer of 1946.

=== 47th (London) Divisional RE ===
47th (London) Division's formation sign.

The 2nd Line divisional RE mobilised with its HQ at the Duke of York's HQ and its men scattered around houses in Cadogan Gardens, Chelsea. The recruits had at least benefited from attendance at the 1st Line's 1939 summer camp. Almost immediately, 501 Fd Co formed at Chelsea transferred to 1st London Division, the other 2nd Line companies forming at New Barnet. While under training there, 503 Fd Co laid a water main to nearby Hatfield House to allow it to be used as an emergency hospital.

In January 1940, the companies moved to St Albans, and then each was given responsibility for bomb disposal across a county: 502 Cambridgeshire, 503 Northamptonshire, 504 Bedfordshire. They were then moved round the Midlands until June when they accompanied the division to South Wales on anti-invasion duty (HQRE at Hay-on-Wye, 502 at Carmarthen, 503 at Porthcawl and 504 at Skenfrith). The division was converted from a motor to an infantry division, requiring an additional field company, and was joined by 222 Fd Co. After Dunkirk, see above 222 Fd Co had reformed with the rest of II CTRE at Blandford Camp in Dorset, going into billets round Sutton Veny in Wiltshire; it now moved to a tented camp at Kington, Herefordshire, to join the 2nd London Division.)

As part of the anti-invasion preparations, the companies were set to manufacturing 'Molotov cocktail' petrol bombs in large quantities for the Home Guard. In the autumn, they were moved into winter quarters: 222 at Leominster, 502 at Stourbridge and 504 at Rugeley; 503 remained at Skenfrith with the field park under cover at Blackbrook House. On 21 November the 2nd London Division officially became 47th (London) Division. In February 1941 it moved to the South Coast of England, with HQRE at Hurstpierpoint and the companies with their brigade groups: 222 at Haywards Heath then Worthing, 502 at Chichester, 503 at Withdean and 504 at Billingshurst. The sappers were tasked with re-laying and plotting the minefields that had been hurriedly laid during the previous summer's invasion scare, and suffered some casualties from this dangerous work. They also demolished coastal bungalows to improve fields of fire, and installed hidden bridges round RAF Tangmere to allow for rapid counter-attack in case it was attacked by enemy paratroops. In July, the division was moved back from the coast into reserve, with HQRE at West Hoathly, 222 at Cuckfield, 502 at Goodwood, 503 at Chelwood Gate, and 504 at Crawley with Three Bridges railway station yard as its stores depot. The sappers constructed a divisional battle HQ in the grounds of Knepp Castle near West Grinstead, while the field park set up a production line for blackout screens. The winter quarters that year were at Winchester (HQRE, with 222 at Cottesmore School), Sparsholt (502 at Northwood House), Sheffield Park (503) and Bishop's Waltham (504, with the station sidings for the RE dump).

In December 1941 the division was placed on a lower establishment, though still with an operational role in Home Forces. 503 Field Co left on 29 November 1941 (see below), and 504 Fd Park Co was reduced to field stores section in January 1942. In January 1943 502 Fd Co moved to 80th Infantry (Reserve) Division in North Wales; it later transferred to 38th (Welsh) Infantry Division and remained with it in the UK until the end of the war. By now, 47th (London) Divisional RE consisted solely of 222 Fd Co. It was joined by a new 601 Fd Co on 5 February and by 179 Fd Co (which had served as a tunnelling company in Gibraltar) on 8 February. 179 Field Co left the division on 22 September 1943 and was replaced by 507 Fd Co from 148 Bde Group.

On 2 October 1943, 222 Fd Co left (see below), breaking the last link between the division and its original London engineers. In January 1944, the division was downgraded to reserve status, but it was given a third field company once more when 93 Fd Co (converted from a chemical warfare company) joined on 20 April 1944. However, on 30 July 1944, all three field companies (93, 507, 610) and the field stores section left (probably disbanded), and 47th (London) Division was dispersed in August 1944. 76th Infantry (Reserve) Division was redesignated 47th Infantry (Reserve) Division on 1 September, bringing with it 250 (East Anglian) Fd Co together with a field stores platoon. Finally, 507 Fd Co returned on 29 January 1945, together with 649 Fd Co.

=== 222 Assault Squadron ===
79th Armoured Division's formation badge.

In October 1943, 222 Fd Co left 47th (L) Division and was converted into an Assault Squadron to join 42nd Assault Regiment, RE, in 1st Assault Brigade, RE, of 79th Armoured Division at Aldeburgh in Suffolk. The rest of the regiment comprised Lancashire RE squadrons from the disbanded 42nd Armoured Division. The regiment was to be equipped with the Armoured Vehicle Royal Engineers (AVRE) for the Allied invasion of Normandy (Operation Overlord). 222 Assault Sqn was joined by about 40 tank drivers from the Royal Armoured Corps and began training at Orford Battle Area. Although the regiment trained hard in its new role, it was not until April 1944 that the first production Churchill AVREs arrived.

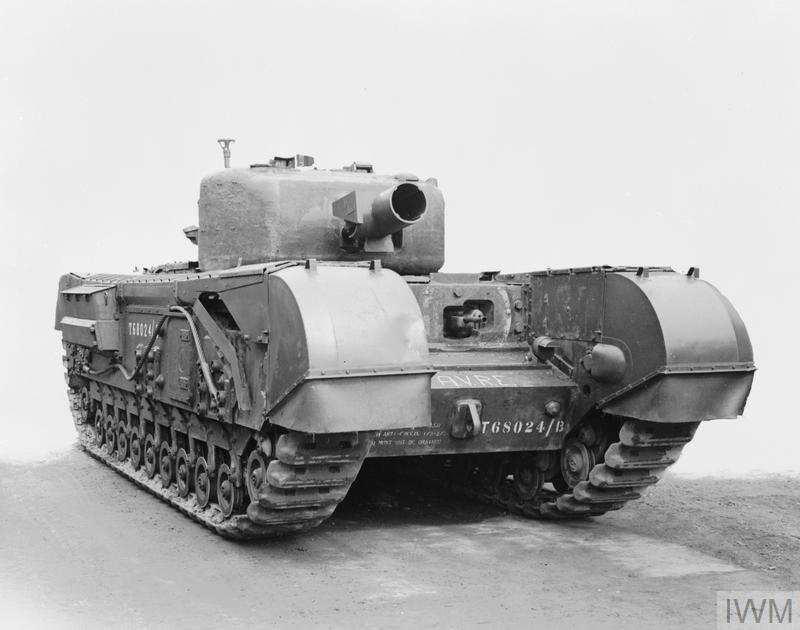
A Churchill AVRE showing the Petard demolition mortar.

42nd Assault Rgt was not committed on D Day, and remained in reserve, with 222 Assault Sqn quartered at Woodbridge, moving in July 1944 to Worthing for final training before embarkation. It landed at Juno Beach on 17 August and for the next week the whole of 1st Assault Bde was concentrated at the River Orne for training on the new Class 50/60 tank raft.

==== Le Havre ====
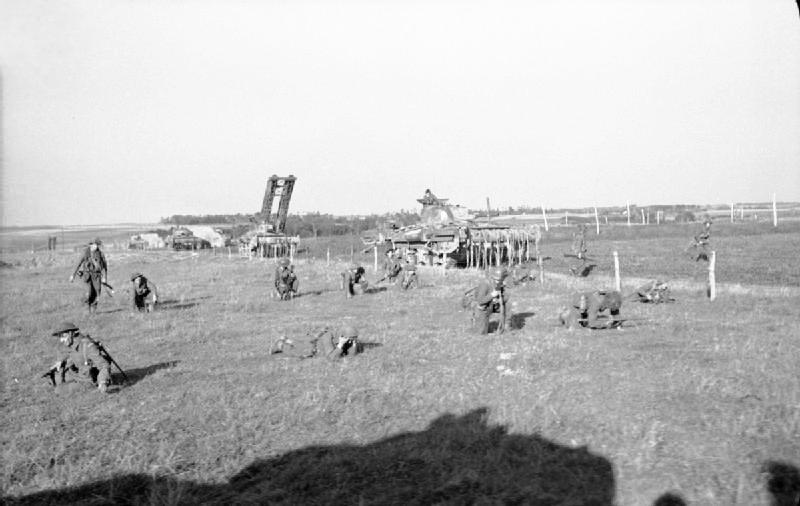
A Churchill AVRE bridgelayer following a Sherman Crab in the attack on Le Havre.

42nd Assault Rgt went into action in Operation Astonia to capture Le Havre on the evening of 10 September. Each attacking infantry brigade was supported by an assault team from 79th Armoured Division: a mixed group of Churchill AVREs, Sherman Crab mine flails and Churchill Crocodile flamethrowing tanks. Part of 222 Assault Sqn provided AVREs for 56 Bde while 2 Troop was with 146 Bde, both of 49th (West Riding) Division. Three of the chosen lanes of attack crossed the fortress's A/T ditch. For these the regiment employed bridgelayer tanks and the AVRE 'Conger' mine clearance device (a flexible hose filled with liquid explosive) for its first use in action. An AVRE of 222 Assault Sqn deployed an older AVRE 'Snake' (utilising a rigid pipe instead of a flexible pipe), but this exploded as it was pushed across the ditch. The AVRE was then put out of action reversing over a mine, and the following bridgelaying AVRE also struck a mine. Thus the 'Hazel' lane through the defences had to be abandoned. In another lane the SBG bridge on the AVRE was hit and fell. A reserve bridge was brought up but was hit 500 yards (460 m) from the ditch. The AVRE crew dismounted and under heavy fire succeeded after 20 minutes in winching it into position. Several AVREs were knocked out by 88 mm A/T guns, but the remainder silenced enemy guns and used their Petard mortars against concrete positions. Once the town was entered, 2 Trp of 222 Sqn pushed on with 146 Bde to take Harfleur, destroying A/T guns and roadblocks as they went. At one point, the AVREs used their petards to fell trees and fill in a ditch. The capture of Le Havre was completed on 12 September.

==== Low Countries ====
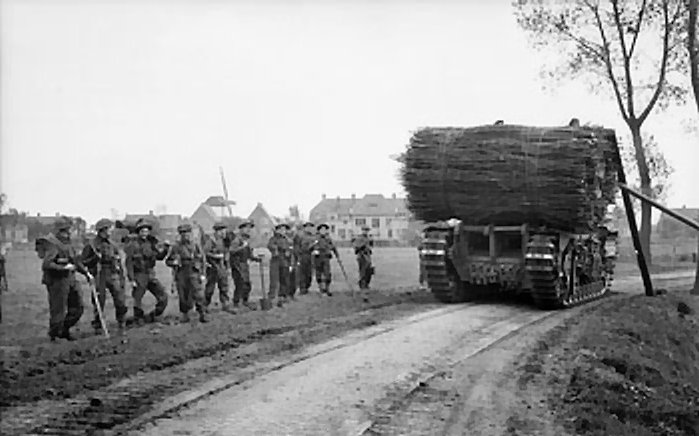
A fascine-carrying AVRE passes infantry during the attack on 's-Hertogenbosch.

79th Armoured Division's squadrons with their varied equipment (the 'Funnies') were often widely scattered and rarely under regimental control. On 4 November, 51st (Highland) Division attacked towards 's-Hertogenbosch with support from 79th Division, including a troop of 222 Assault Sqn, which transported an SBG bridge across 4 miles (6.4 km) of difficult terrain and laid it successfully over a 28 feet (8.5 m) ditch to allow armour to cross.

Offensive operations came to a virtual halt during the winter, and 222 Aslt Sqn rested at Waterscheide. Early in 1945, the squadron took part in Operation Blackcock to clear the Roer Triangle. On 17 January, a troop laid three bridges for 7th Armoured Division's attack on Susteren, while the other two troops operated with two columns formed by 8th Armoured Bde and 52nd (Lowland) Division. Captain Herbert Baynton-Jones of 222 Sqn supporting 4th/7th Dragoon Guards was awarded a Military Cross (MC) for dismounting to take control of an RE mineclearing detachment and then leading his troop of AVREs to attack a village with their petards.

==== Germany ====
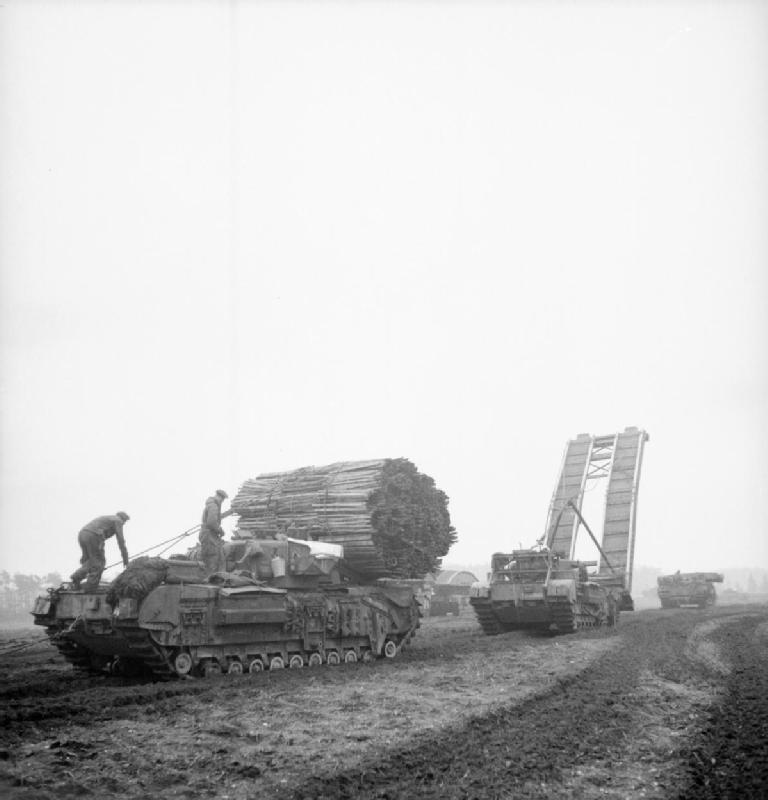
AVREs with SBG bridge and fascines move up during Operation Veritable.

42nd Assault Rgt next participated in the Battle of the Reichswald (Operation Veritable). On 8 February, 222 Assault Sqn supported 51st (Highland) Division, which advanced down three lanes cleared by flails. In each lane, the flails were followed by two AVRE bridgelayers and two carrying Fascines. In the right hand lane, all went well; the centre lane was blocked by a knocked-out flail tank, but the AVREs completed a fascine crossing by the evening; the third lane was impassable due to mud. Captain D. Hamilton, OC 1 Trp, was awarded an MC for this operation. On 13/14 February, 51st HD crossed the River Niers and took Heijin, where 222 Aslt Sqn bridged a crater and destroyed a roadblock, then laid a bridge that allowed the division to enter Hommersum. 222 Assault Sqn next helped 51st HD to capture Hervorst on 17 February; during the fighting, 3 Trp attacked and destroyed a large pillbox with petards. Then on 19–20 March the squadron helped 51st HD capture Goch, penetrating the defences and reducing pillboxes.

While Veritable continued, 42 Assault Rgt was withdrawn to Nijmegen to train for the Rhine crossing (Operation Plunder), particularly operating Class 50/60 rafts. These consisted of five linked pontoons supporting a section of roadway to ferry a tank. For the final stretch of their journey to the riverbank, the heavy pontoons on sledges were towed by AVREs. Once launched, the ferries were hauled to and fro across the river by RAF Barrage balloon winches. For the crossing on the night of 23/24 March, 42nd Assault Rgt was assigned to 15th (Scottish) Division leading XII Corps' attack at Xanten. Having hauled their pontoons through the mud, 42nd Assault Rgt began assembling its rafts at 02.45 on 24 March, and had three operational by 21.00 that night. Two ferry points were used, each with two rafts; 222 Assault Sqn and half of 81 Assault Sqn operated the ferry point codenamed 'Abdullah'. The regiment ran its ferries until the afternoon of 26 March, when a Bailey bridge was completed (by 503 Fd Co, see below), during which period it carried 311 tanks and self-propelled guns and a few wheeled vehicles.

After the Rhine crossing, 21st Army Group fanned out over North Germany towards the River Elbe. 222 Assault Sqn was in Second Army Reserve, then supported 3rd Division in crossing the flooded approaches to Bremen, using their petards to flush defenders out of strongpoints, and skid Baileys to cross breaches in the causeways. Most of Bremen was in British hands by 27 April. 21st Army Group continued its advance until the German surrender at Lüneburg Heath on 4 May, when the squadron had reached Baden, Lower Saxony.

It was intended to reorganise 42 Assault Rgt for service in the Far East, but this was cancelled after the Surrender of Japan, and 222 Aslt Sqn was disbanded at Garlstorf in Germany.

=== 223 (London) Field Park Company ===
After evacuation from Dunkirk, the scattered parties of this company were gathered at Ripon in Yorkshire and then reformed at Barnsley in late June. It was sent to Penge to work on the defences of London alongside civilian contractors and military labour. During the London Blitz, the company also dealt with unexploded bombs and assisted the Civil Defence Service, Auxiliary Fire Service, police and Home Guard. In 1941 the company moved to Pinner and then Cockfosters in North London, where it was engaged in general works and training the Home Guard. It was disbanded in February 1942.

=== 503 (London) Field Company ===
After 503 Fd Co left 47th Divisional RE on 29 November 1941, it joined London District Troops RE, and was billeted in St Aloysius College, Highgate. For a year, it trained as a normal field company, affiliated to 32 Independent Guards Bde. In 1942, it accompanied the brigade to Saunton Sands in Devon for training. It then became a posting unit for RE personnel who were unable to go overseas with their units; however, in December 1942, it received 60 per cent reinforcements and mobilised for overseas service itself as an independent field company. On 16 January 1943, it embarked at Glasgow aboard the RMS Arundel Castle for the Middle East. It disembarked at Port Tewfik in April and went into training in Egypt. While there, it built a pontoon bridge in 24 hours to replace one damaged by a ship.

==== Italy ====
The company next went to Gaza to join 35 Beach Group, in training as a reserve unit for Operation Husky. It was then assigned to Operation Avalanche, the landing at Salerno (see above). It was transported by road and sea to Algeria, concentrating at Bougie. Company Sergeant Major L.J. King was awarded a George Medal for rescuing some gunners from a vehicle whose ammunition was burning after a bombing raid. 35 Beach Group landed at Salerno on 9 September immediately after the leading infantry. The sappers' task was to lay Sommerfeld tracking and create roads across the beach to the intended supply dumps, as well as clear minefields. They suffered numerous casualties from shellfire, and won an MBE, two MCs and two MMs during the beachhead fighting. After the armies moved north, 503 Fd Co remained at Salerno for the rest of the year, carrying out municipal and civil engineering, repairing the sewer system and the airfield, and operating a stone quarry for the usual road repairs. Formally, 503 Fd Co was now part of 14th GHQ Troops RE.Early in January 1944 the company moved north to the Volturno, then to Teano near Naples. In early March the company was withdrawn and sailed from Naples to the UK

==== Normandy ====
The company landed at Liverpool, and after leave and training joined 7th Army Troops RE. This group of sapper units was earmarked for Operation Overlord (see above). It landed in Normandy on D+6, and one of its first tasks was to construct a 4 miles (6.4 km) road to bypass the congested town centre of Bayeux. This was 45 feet (14 m) wide between side drains, with a roadway 21 feet (6.4 m) wide chiefly composed of Sommerfeld track and chestnut paling covered with sand and gravel. The company then moved to Caen on bridge and road maintenance, losing casualties to enemy snipers. After 21st Army Group's breakout from the Normandy beachhead 7th Army TRE went to bridge the Seine, but 503 Fd Co was not involved. Instead, it went to camouflage the oil tanks erected for the Pluto oil pipeline at Boulogne and clear mines in the area. They also cleared beach obstacles at Ambleteuse and at Ostend once that port had been captured, losing further casualties in this dangerous work.

==== Holland and Germany ====
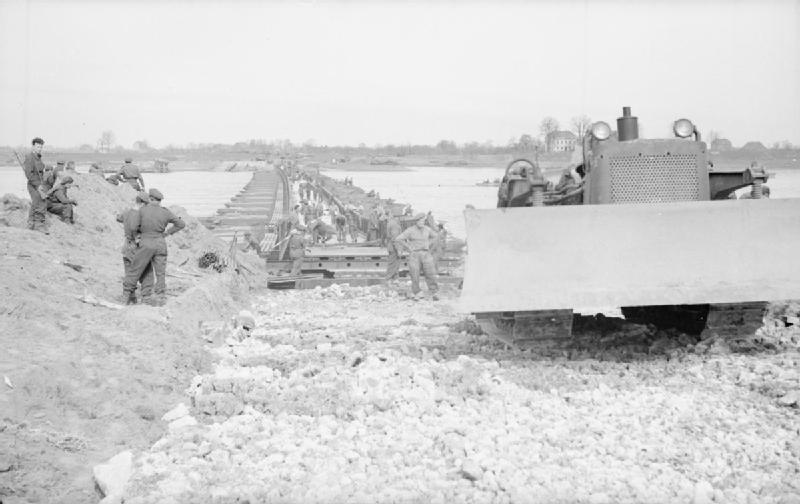
Bulldozer preparing roadway down to a Class 40 Bailey pontoon bridge over the Rhine.

503 Field Co spent the winter of 1944–45 in South Holland on bridge and road maintenance. At Gennep in February it participated with 7th ATRE in building the longest Class 40 Bailey bridge yet constructed, (4,008 feet (1,222 m) including the approach viaducts across the floods at each end), followed in March by a 550 feet (170 m) Class 40 floating Bailey at Well, Limburg, and a Class 70 high level pontoon bridge at Venlo. For the Rhine crossing (Operation Plunder, see above) 503 Fd Co and 7th ATRE built a Class 40 tactical pontoon Bailey at Xanten, utilising an existing ferry site. Craters in the ferry approach road had to be filled by tipper trucks before zero hour while the barrage was being fired, but the bridge was built in 31 hours, the first one completed during the operation. It carried 29,139 vehicles in the next six days as 21st Army Group advanced across Germany.

503 Field Co was then ordered to Münster, but while the rest of 7th ATRE advanced to bridge the Elbe, the company was diverted back into Holland to join HQ Netherland Force, just before VE Day. Over the following months, the company was engaged in rehabilitation work in the liberated area, principally bridging rivers and canals, installing Bailey bridges with lifting sections. It also trained 5 Engineer Company of the Royal Netherlands Army in Bailey bridging, and supervised German Prisoners of War clearing mines on the Frisian Islands. 503 Field Co remained in Holland until November 1945 and was eventually disbanded in Minden, Germany.

== Postwar ==
56th (London) Armoured Divisional sign 1948–51.

When the TA was reconstituted on 1 May 1947, the 56th (London) Divisional RE initially reformed as Y Regiment, RE, then taking its seniority (from 1st Middlesex Engineers) as the senior TA RE regiment, it was numbered 101 Field Engineer Regiment, RE, with HQ in a modern building at DOYHQ in Chelsea. It was the divisional engineer regiment for 56th (London) Division, which served as an armoured division from 1947 until 1956, and as an infantry division until disbandment in 1961. 101 Field Engineer Rgt received the 'London' designation in 1954.

In addition, the former 47th (London) Divisional RE together with the former London Corps TRE (descended from the Tower Hamlets Engineers) formed 121 Construction Regiment, RE, based at Chelsea with the following organisation:

- 316 Construction Squadron, field sqn from 1951, disbanded 1961
- 323 Electrical and Mechanical Squadron, absorbed by 101 Rgt 1950
- 328 Construction Squadron at Linden Grove, Peckham, absorbed by 101 Rgt 1950
- 342 Electrical and Mechanical Squadron, disbanded 1961
- 579 Construction Squadron at Dover, became independent 579 Bomb Disposal Sqn in 1950 and was disbanded in 1967

The regiment became 121 Army Engineer Regiment in 1951 and was disbanded in 1961.

Following absorption of part of 121 Construction Rgt on 1 July 1950, 101 Field Engineer Rgt had the following organisation:

- RHQ at DOYHQ, Chelsea
- 220 Field Squadron, moved to Vicarage Lane, Heston, on 1 October 1950
- 221 Field Squadron, absorbed 328 Construction Sqn from 121 Rgt and moved to Linden Grove, Peckham
- 222 Field Squadron at DOYHQ
- 223 Field Park Squadron at DOYHQ, absorbed 323 Electrical and Mechanical Sqn from 121 Rgt

When the TA was reduced in 1961, 56th Division was disbanded and the regiment became 101 (London) Corps Engineer Rgt in 27 Engineer Group. It retained only a single squadron (222), but absorbed the remainder of the disbanded 121 Construction Rgt as 324 Field Sqn:

- RHQ at Chelsea
- 222 (Chelsea) Fd Sqn
  - HQ Trp (from 222 Sqn) at Chelsea
  - No 1 Trp (from 220 Sqn) at Heston
  - No 2 Trp (from 221 Sqn) at Chelsea
  - No 3 Trp (from 223 Sqn) at Chelsea
- 324 Fd Sqn
  - HQ, Nos 1 & 2 Trps at Uxbridge Road
  - No 3 Trp at Epsom

When the TA was reduced into the Territorial and Army Volunteer Reserve (TAVR) in 1967, the regiment was disbanded and its personnel became C Company in 10th Battalion, Queen's Regiment (Middlesex), while 324 Fd Sqn's men joined the Surrey Yeomanry (Queen Mary's). However, a new 101 (City of London) Engineer Regiment formed in 1988 revived its name and heritage. In 1993, 590 (Explosive Ordnance Disposal) Squadron in 101 (City of London) Engineer Regiment was redesignated 221 Field Squadron (EOD) to perpetuate one of the 47th's squadrons.

== Ceremonial ==
=== Uniforms and insignia ===
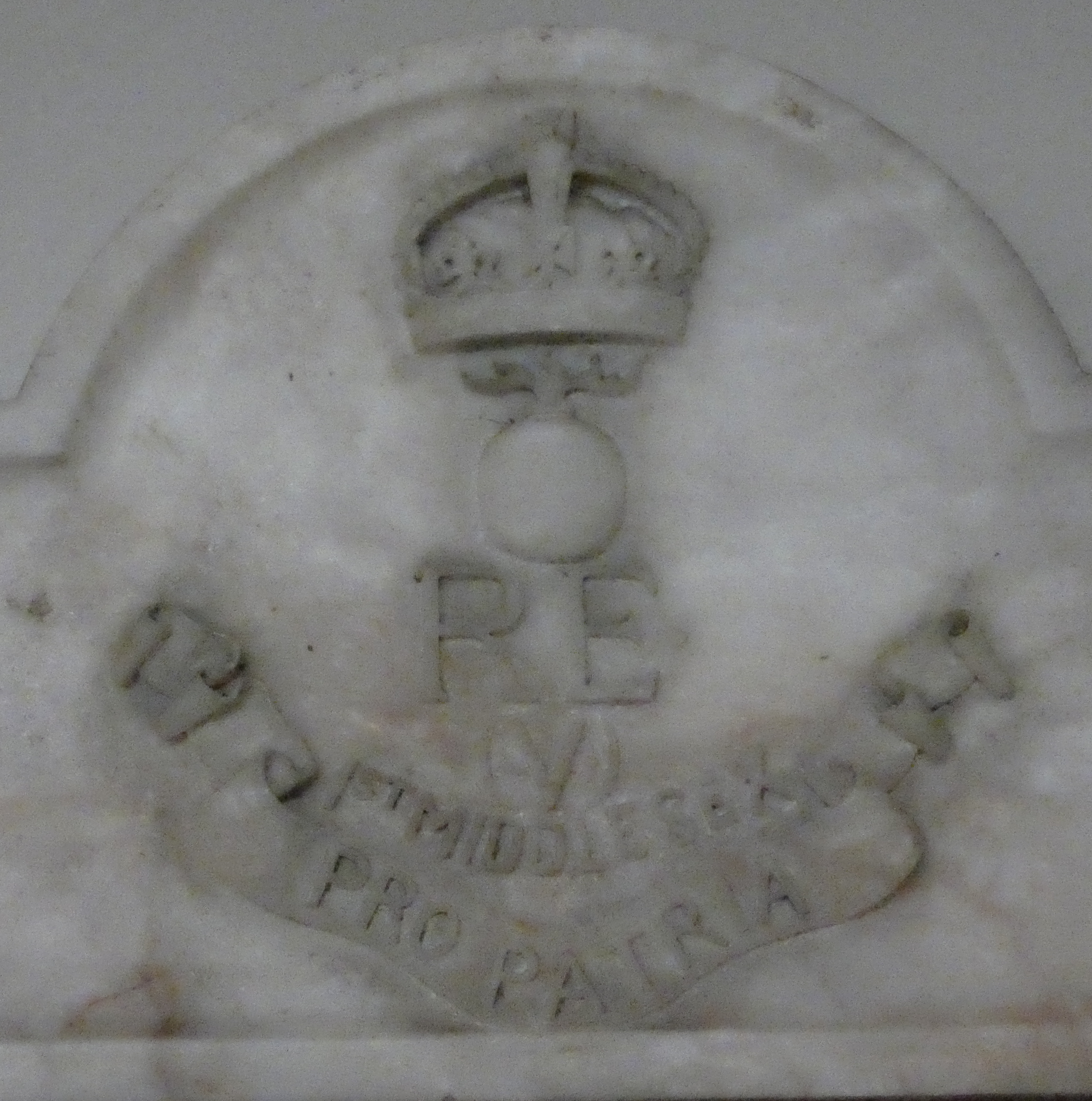
1st Middlesex Royal Engineers (Volunteers) badge 1896–1908, from the unit's Second Boer War memorial in St Luke's Church, Chelsea.

The 1st Middlesex EVC wore RE uniform – a Busby with white plume supported by a 'grenade' badge, scarlet tunic, and blue trousers with broad red stripe – but all badges, buckles, piping and lace were silver or white rather than gold or yellow. The 'RE' cipher on accoutrements was replaced by 'EV'; in 1871, the unit adopted a new 'grenade' badge with the Royal arms and '1 M.E.V.' lettering. A Kilmarnock Bonnet was worn instead of the busby in working dress. In 1880, the blue Home Service helmet replaced the busby, with silver helmet plate, spike and chains in place of the RE's brass. Khaki service dress was adopted for training after the Second Boer War. Until 1908, the RE cap badge with 'Royal Engineer Volunteers' on the lower scroll was worn by volunteer units; however, the unit's Boer War memorial shows a crowned grenade badge over the letters 'RE /(V)/1st Middlesex', with the scroll showing 'Pro Patria'. The TF units of the RE continued to wear silver badges and buttons in full dress, but 2nd London Divisional RE was granted the distinction of gold or gilt in 1909.

56th (London) Divisional sign 1951–56.

During the First World War, sappers wore the formation signs of their divisions, the eight-pointed white star on a blue ground of the 47th, and the black bee on a yellow ground of the 60th. During the Second World War, the 1st London (56th) Division adopted a black silhouette of Dick Whittington's cat on a red ground as its formation sign, leading to its nickname of the 'Black Cats'. 2nd London (47th) Division used a bow of ribbon supporting two bells (for Bow Bells) in red on black, designed by Corporal Valder of 504 Fd Park Co (both badges appear on the war memorial in St Luke's Church). When 222 Assault Sqn joined 79th Armoured Division it not only adopted the divisional badge of a black and white bull's head on an inverted yellow triangle, but also the regimental sign of 42nd Assault Regiment: a red diamond with a white centre, derived from 42nd Armoured Division.

From 1948, 56th (London) Armoured Division wore a blue knight's helmet superimposed on the upright red sword of St Paul (from the Coat of arms of the City of London), which 56th Division had worn in the First World War, but in 1951 it resumed the black cat, now with the red sword superimposed. 101 Field Engineer Rgt wore this until the division was disbanded in 1961, thereafter it wore the gold grenade on blue ground of 27 Engineer Group.

=== Affiliations ===
In 1951, the regiment was adopted by the Metropolitan Borough of Chelsea, 220 Fd Sqn by the Municipal Borough of Heston and Isleworth, and 221 Fd Sqn by the Metropolitan Borough of Camberwell. The Freedom of the Borough of Chelsea was conferred on the regiment in 1960 and the subtitle 'Chelsea' was granted to 222 Sqn after the regiment was reduced in 1961. In 1962, the regiment was adopted by the Worshipful Company of Paviors, which supported the civil engineering industry.

== Commanders ==
=== Commanding Officers ===
The following officers commanded the 1st Middlesex Engineers:

- Lieutenant-Colonel Norman MacLeod of MacLeod, 1860–71
- Lieutenant-Colonel A. Ransome, 1871–80
- Lieutenant-Colonel F.T. Ball, 1880–92
- Lieutenant-Colonel F. Josselyn, VD, 1892–99
- Lieutenant-Colonel G.A. Petter, 1899–1902
- Lieutenant-Colonel E.T. Clifford, VD, 1902–08

47th (2nd London) Divisional Engineers
The following served as Commanding Royal Engineer (CRE), of 2nd London Division (later 47th):

- Colonel E.T. Clifford, VD, TD, 1908–10
- Lieutenant-Colonel H.H. Taylor, TD, 15 April 1910 – 31 August 1914
- Colonel A.H. Kenney, CMG, DSO,1 September 1914 – 30 July 1915
- Lieutenant-Colonel Sydney D'Aguilar Crookshank, DSO, CB, CIE, MVO, 30 July 1915 – 27 November 1916
- Lieutenant-Colonel W.S. Trail, DSO, 27 November 1916 – 24 May 1917
- Lieutenant-Colonel H.S. Christie, DSO, 24 May 1917 – 26 November 1917
- Lieutenant-Colonel A.B. Carey, CMG, DSO, 26 November 1917 – 1 November 1918
- Lieutenant-Colonel H.J. Couchman, DSO, MC, 1 November 1918–demobilisation
- Lieutenant-Colonel A.G. Birch, DSO, 16 February 1920 – 2 June 1923
- Lieutenant-Colonel S.H. Fisher, MC, 2 June 1923 – 2 June 1929
- Lieutenant-Colonel C.E.P. Sankey, DSO, 2 June 1929 – 2 June 1933
- Lieutenant-Colonel R.G. Whitman, 2 June 1933–conversion

60th (2/2nd London) Divisional Engineers
The following served as CRE of 2/2nd London Division (later 60th):

- Colonel R.Q. Henriques, TD, September 1914–8 August 1917
- Lieutenant-Colonel C.B. Thomson, DSO, 27 August 1917 – 27 May 1918
- Lieutenant-Colonel A.J.G. Bird, DSO, 27 May 1918–demobilisation

56th (London) Divisional Engineers
The following served as CRE of 1st London Division (later 56th):

- Brevet-Colonel R.G. Whitman, TD, formation–December 1937
- Lieutenant-Colonel J. McEwan-Martin, OBE, TD, December 1937–June 1941
- Lieutenant-Colonel W. McM. Keane, June 1941–August 1942
- Lieutenant-Colonel R.I.C. Blenkinsop, DSO, August 1942–June 1944
- Lieutenant-Colonel H.B. Calvert, DSO, June 1944–November 1944
- Lieutenant-ColonelR.E.C. Hughes, DSO, MBE, MC, November 1944–April 1945
- Lieutenant-Colonel R.T. Brain, MC, April 1945–demobilisation

47th (London) Divisional Engineers
The following served as CRE of 2nd London Division (later 47th):

- Lieutenant-Colonel S.C.P. Drury, DCM, TD, April 1939–April 1942
- Lieutenant-Colonel F.E. Pool, MBE, April–October 1942
- Lieutenant-Colonel C.P.C.S. Bright, October 1942–disbandment

101 (London) Field Engineer Regiment
The following commanded the regiment:

- Lieutenant-Colonel A.R. Mais, OBE, TD, May 1947–May 1950
- Lieutenant-Colonel J.R. Grimsdell, MC, TD, May 1950–May 1953
- Lieutenant-Colonel H.E.A. Donnelly, MC, May 1953–February 1954
- Lieutenant-Colonel J.A.J. Darlow, ERD, TD, February 1954–February 1957
- Lieutenant-Colonel R.E. Owen, OBE, TD, February 1957–February 1960
- Brevet-Colonel M.J. Grafton, OBE, TD, February 1960–February 1964
- Lieutenant-Colonel F.G. Dunford, TD, February 1964–disbandment

=== Honorary colonels ===
The following officers served as honorary colonel of the unit:

- Field Marshal Sir John Fox Burgoyne, 1st Baronet, GCB, appointed 5 March 1861
- Colonel MacLeod of MacLeod, appointed 28 November 1871
- Field Marshal Sir John Lintorn Simmons, GCB, GCMG, appointed 10 April 1895
- Colonel E.T. Clifford, CBE, VD, TD, appointed 23 May 1910
- Major-General Sir Sydney D'Aguilar Crookshank, KCMG, CB, CIE, DSO, MVO, appointed 3 March 1923
- Colonel S.H. Fisher, CB, MC, TD, appointed 23 November 1929
- Colonel A.R. Mais, OBE, ERD, TD, appointed 1958

=== Other prominent members ===
- Major Sir Lionel Alexander, 6th Baronet, OC 47th (2nd London) Signal Co 3 August 1913–December 1915
- Ven Henry Bevan, Archdeacon of Middlesex and Rector of St Luke's Church, Chelsea, Chaplain from 21 April 1903
- Capt Pierse Joseph Mackesy, OC 518th (1/4th London) Fd Co 1 June 1917 – 22 March 1918
- Lt Christopher Robin Milne, with 56th Divisional RE in Italy, 1943

== Memorials ==
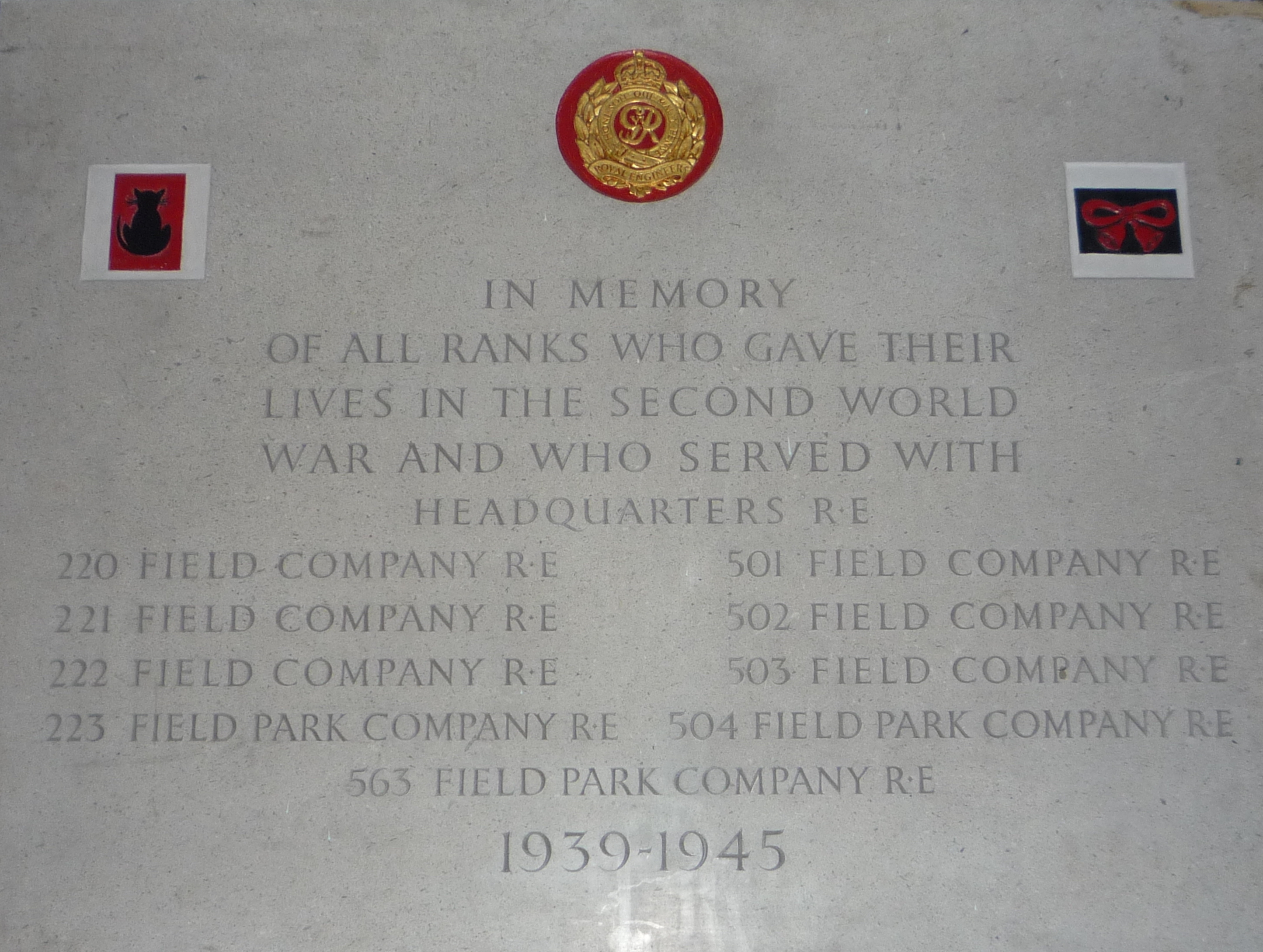
World War II memorial to 47th (London) and 56th (London) Divisional Engineers in St Luke's Church, Chelsea.

An incised stone memorial plaque surmounted by the then badge of the 1st Middlesex RE Volunteers, commemorating the five sappers who died during the Second Boer War, is fixed to the north interior wall of St Luke's Church, Chelsea.

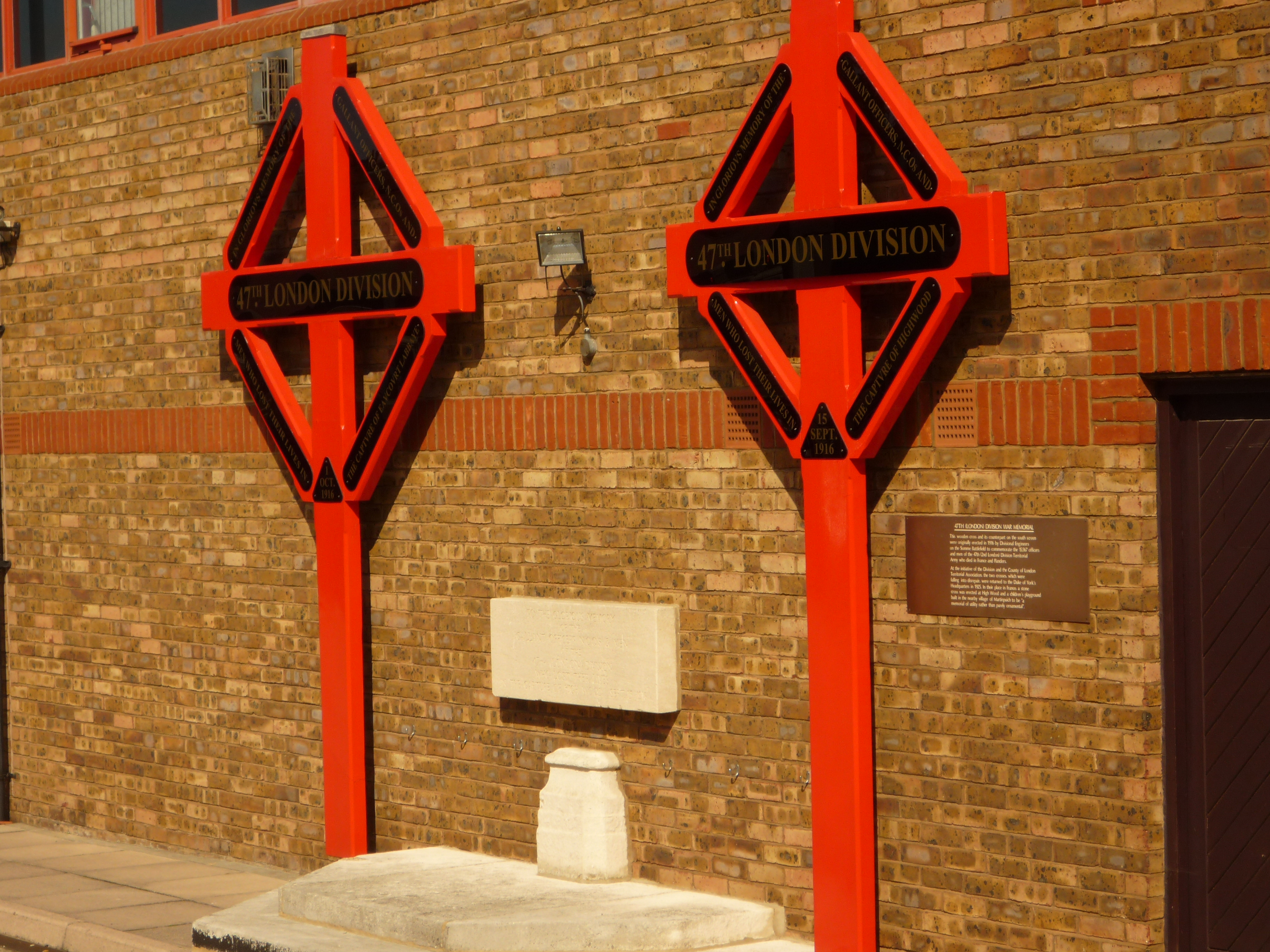
The two wooden memorial crosses were originally erected at High Wood and Eaucourt l'Abbaye by 517th (1/3rd London) Field Company in February 1918.

The 2nd London Divisional Royal Engineers are listed on the London Troops Memorial, erected after the First World War, in front of the Royal Exchange, London (an addition for the Second World War was made to this memorial in 1955). There was also a bronze memorial listing the unit's 1914–18 losses at its drill hall.

Two wooden memorial crosses erected at High Wood and Eaucourt l'Abbaye by carpenters of 517th (1/3rd London) Field Company in February 1918 were falling into disrepair by 1925, when they were replaced in stone. The restored wooden crosses were preserved at the Duke of York's Headquarters in London (the former divisional HQRE) until that building was sold in 2003, and are now at Connaught House, the HQ of the London Irish Rifles at Flodden Road, Camberwell.

A stone plaque bearing the formation badges of 56th (1st London) and 47th (2nd London) Divisions and listing all the 1st and 2nd Line field companies that served in 1939–45 was unveiled in the inner porch of St Luke's Church in 1960.

== External sources ==
- British Army units from 1945 on
- Geoff Sullivan's compilations at 'Hut Six'
- Imperial War Museum, War Memorials Register
- Orders of Battle at Patriot Files
- Land Forces of Britain, the Empire and Commonwealth – Regiments.org (archive site)
