= Sydney Crookshank =

Major-General Sir Sydney Crookshank KCMG CB CIE DSO MVO
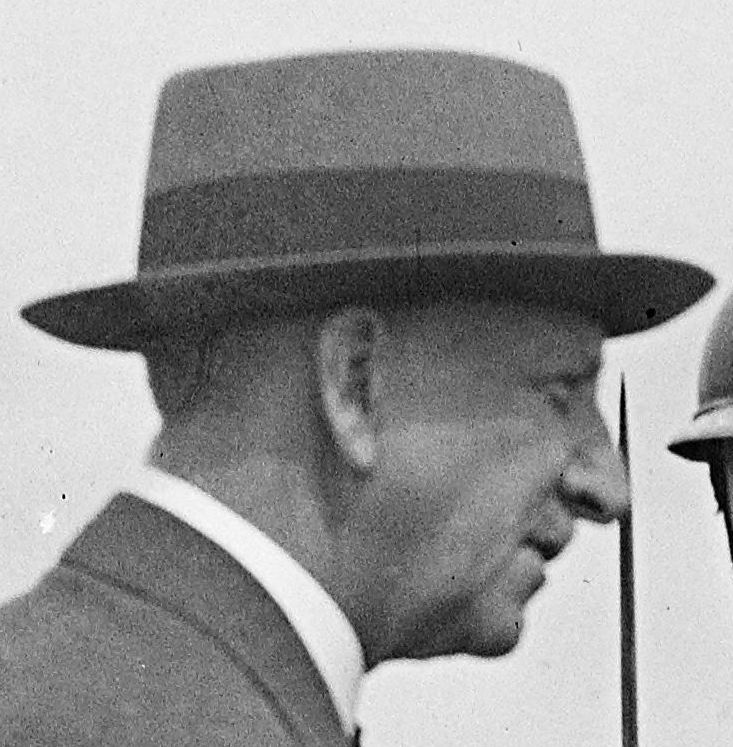
- Crookshank in 1928
- Born: 3 June 1870
- Died: 17 August 1941 (aged 71)

Major-General Sir Sydney D'Aguilar Crookshank KCMG CB CIE DSO MVO (3 June 1870 – 17 August 1941) was a British military engineer who served with the Royal Engineers in the British Army and the British Indian Army. Most of his early career was spent in colonial service; he later served as a senior officer during the First World War.

As a temporary lieutenant-colonel he was Commander, Royal Engineers (CRE), of 47th (1/2nd London) Division on the Western Front from 30 July 1915 to 27 November 1916. On 21 May 1916 in the Vimy sector the Germans fired a mine and attacked the division's positions in overwhelming numbers. The situation was so critical for a while that Crookshank brought his Sappers of 47th (2nd London) Divisional Engineers up to man the trenches as infantry. He was awarded a Distinguished Service Order on 3 June 1916. In January 1917 he was promoted to the temporary rank of brigadier general and made a chief engineer of XV Corps. He was made an officer of the French Legion of Honour in December 1917.

Later, as a major general he was appointed Director-General (Transportation) of the British Armies in France on 19 March 1918.

After the war, Crookshank was appointed honorary colonel of 47th (2nd London) Divisional Engineers on 3 March 1923.

In February 1936 he succeeded Lieutenant General Sir George Fowke as colonel commandant of the Royal Engineers.
