= 1st Middlesex Volunteers =

Several units of the Volunteer Force formed in Middlesex from 1859 shared the number 1:

- 1st (Hanover Square) Middlesex Artillery Volunteer Corps
- 1st Middlesex Engineers
- 1st (Victoria Rifle Club) Middlesex Rifle Volunteer Corps
- 1st (Regent Street) Middlesex Light Horse Volunteers
