= Volunteer Force =

British military reserve force (1859–1908)

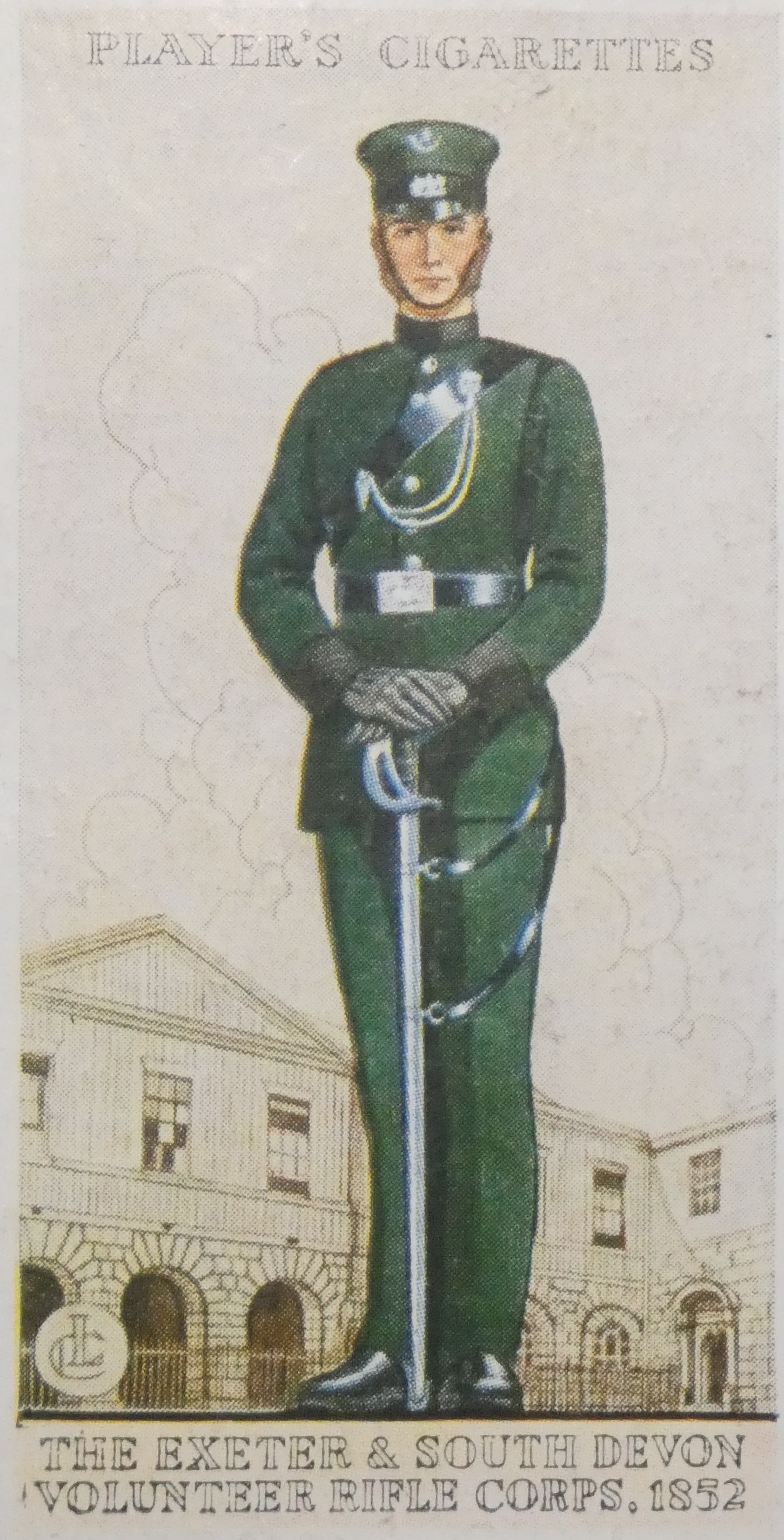
An officer of the Exeter and South Devon Volunteers, which became the Volunteer Force's first unit upon its founding

The Volunteer Force was a military reserve force raised in the United Kingdom in 1859. It was raised by the War Office in response to fears of an invasion of Britain following the potential outbreak of war with another European power, and was intended to compensate for the relatively small number of British Army troops stationed in Britain. Originally highly autonomous, the force's units became increasingly integrated with the British army following the 1881 Childers Reforms in 1881 and was fully integrated into the Territorial Force in 1908. Most of the infantry, artillery, engineer and signals units of the British Army's Army Reserve directly descend from Volunteer Force units.

== The British Army following the Crimean War ==
Prior to the Crimean War, the British military (i.e., land forces) was made up of multiple separate forces, with a basic division into the Regular Forces (including the British Army, composed primarily of cavalry and infantry, and the Ordnance Military Corps of the Board of Ordnance, made up of the Royal Artillery, Royal Engineers, and the Royal Sappers and Miners though not including the originally civilian Commissariat Department, stores and supply departments, all of which, with barracks and other departments, were absorbed into the British Army when the Board of Ordnance was abolished in 1855). and the Reserve Forces. After the 1855 consolidation of the Regular Forces (ignoring minor forces such as the Yeomen Warders and the Yeomen of the Guard) into the Regular Force (i.e., the British Army), there still remained a number of British military (not to be confused with naval) forces that were not part of the British Army; specifically the part-time Reserve Forces, which had at various times included the Honourable Artillery Company, Militia Force (also referred to as the Constitutional Force, and originally an infantry force), the Yeomanry Force (made up of mounted units, organised similarly to the Volunteer Force), Volunteer Force, and Fencibles. Equivalents were also raised in the Crown Dependencies and many colonies. Known collectively as the Reserve Forces, most of these had been allowed to lapse after the Napoleonic Wars, although the Yeomanry was maintained to potentially support the civil authorities against civil unrest, as at the 1819 Peterloo massacre, the Militia remained as a paper tiger, and rifle clubs were encouraged as the backbone against which the Volunteer force might be re-raised. The Militia and Volunteer Force were both re-organised in the 1850s. These forces were originally local-service, embodied during wartime or emergency, and placed under the control of Lord-Lieutenants of counties, and, in British colonies, under the colonial governors. After the British Army's Regular Reserve was created in 1859, by Secretary of State for War Sidney Herbert, and re-organised under the Reserve Force Act 1867 (30 & 31 Vict. c. 110), the Reserve forces, to avoid confusion, were generally known as the Auxiliary Forces or Local Forces. The Regulation of the Forces Act 1871 removed the Lord-Lieutenant as head of the county reserve forces and they were increasingly integrated with the British Army.

The British Volunteer Corps was raised in 1794 during the French Revolutionary Wars but was disbanded in 1814, with its cavalry units continuing to exist as the Yeomanry Cavalry. Following the Crimean War, it was painfully clear to the War Office that, with half of the British Army dispositioned around the Empire on garrison duty, it had insufficient forces available to quickly compose and despatch an effective expeditionary force to a new area of conflict, unless it was to reduce the British Isles' own defences. During the Crimean War, the War Office had been forced to send troops from the British Militia and Yeomanry Cavalry to make up the shortfall of soldiers in the British Army. The situation had been complicated by the fact that both auxiliary forces were under the control of the Home Office until 1855.

Tensions rose between the United Kingdom and France following the Orsini affair, an assassination attempt on Emperor Napoleon III on 14 January 1858. It emerged that the would-be assassin, Felice Orsini had travelled to England to have the bombs used in the attack manufactured in Birmingham. The perceived threat of invasion by the much larger French Army was such that, even without sending a third of the army to another Crimea, Britain's military defences had already been stretched invitingly thin. On 29 April 1859 war broke out between France and the Austrian Empire (the Second Italian War of Independence), and there were fears that Britain might be caught up in a wider European conflict.

== Creation of the Volunteer Force ==
On 12 May 1859, the Secretary of State for War, Jonathan Peel issued a circular letter to lieutenants of counties in England, Wales and Scotland, authorising the formation of volunteer rifle corps (VRC, a.k.a. corps of rifle volunteers and rifle volunteer corps), and of artillery corps in defended coastal towns. Volunteer corps were to be raised under the provisions of the Volunteer Act 1804 (44 Geo. 3. c. 54), which had been used to form local defence forces during the Napoleonic Wars. Alfred Tennyson captured the spirit of the time by publishing his poem Riflemen Form in The Times on 9 May 1859. As a basis for the units, many communities had rifle clubs for the enjoyment of the sport of shooting.

- Corps were only to be formed on the recommendation of the county's lord-lieutenant.
- Officers were to hold their commissions from the lord-lieutenant
- Members of the corps were to swear an oath of allegiance before a justice of the peace, deputy lieutenant or commissioned officer of the corps.
- The force was liable to be called out "in case of actual invasion, or of appearance of an enemy in force on the coast, or in case of rebellion arising in either of these emergencies."
- While under arms volunteers were subject to military law and were entitled to be billeted and to receive regular army pay.
- Members were not permitted to quit the force during actual military service, and at other times had to give fourteen days notice before being permitted to leave the corps.
- Members were to be returned as "effective" if they had attended eight days drill and exercise in four months, or 24 days within a year.
- The members of the corps were to provide their own arms and equipment, and were to defray all costs except when assembled for actual service.
- Volunteers were also permitted to choose the design of their uniforms, subject to the lord-lieutenant's approval.
- Although volunteers were to pay for their own firearms, they were to be provided under the superintendence of the War Office, so as to ensure uniformity of gauge.
- The number of officers and private men in each county and corps was to be settled by the War Office, based on the lord-lieutenant's recommendation.

Originally corps were to consist of approximately 100 all ranks under the command of a captain, with some localities having subdivisions of thirty men under a lieutenant. The purpose of the rifle corps was to harass the invading enemy's flanks, while artillery corps were to man coastal guns and forts. Although not mentioned in the circular letter, engineer corps were also formed, principally to place underwater mines for port defence. Stretcher-bearers attached to the rifle corps subsequently formed volunteer medical detachments affiliated to the Army Medical Corps. In a handful of counties, units of light horse or mounted rifles were formed.

Two volunteer units whose services had been accepted by Queen Victoria during the early 1850s became the two senior rifle corps of the new force. These were the Exeter and South Devon Volunteers, formed in 1852, who became the 1st Devonshire Rifle Volunteers (and were often referred to as the 1st Rifle Volunteer Corps), and the Victoria Rifles (descended from the Duke of Cumberland's Sharpshooters, formed in 1803) who became the 1st Middlesex Rifle Volunteers. An order of precedence was established for ninety-two other counties, depending upon the date of establishment of the first corps in the county.

The most senior artillery corps was the 1st Northumberland formed at Tynemouth on 2 August 1859.

Initially, there were attempts at class distinction with the middle class seeing the formation of rifle units as a contrast with the strict class divide between the officers of the gentry and the other ranks of the working class and farm labourers of the militia and the standing army. Some also compared the initiative, small unit tactics and marksmanship principles of rifle regiments of the Napoleonic Wars compared with the linear tactics of the standing army. Many units initially favoured green and grey (colours until then used by British and German rifle units in their armies) rifleman uniforms as opposed to the red coats of the infantry and engineers of the army and militia. In turn, the army was glad not to have amateur volunteers wear the scarlet of the regulars. The provisions of the volunteers having to purchase their own rifles and uniforms was felt by some to exclude the lower classes.

Unlike regular rifle regiments, the volunteer units had colours often made and presented by the women of the community. These were unauthorised, however, with the Volunteer Regulations stating "Neither Standards nor Colours are to be carried by Corps on parade, as the Volunteer Force is composed of Arms to which their use is not appropriate".

== Consolidation ==
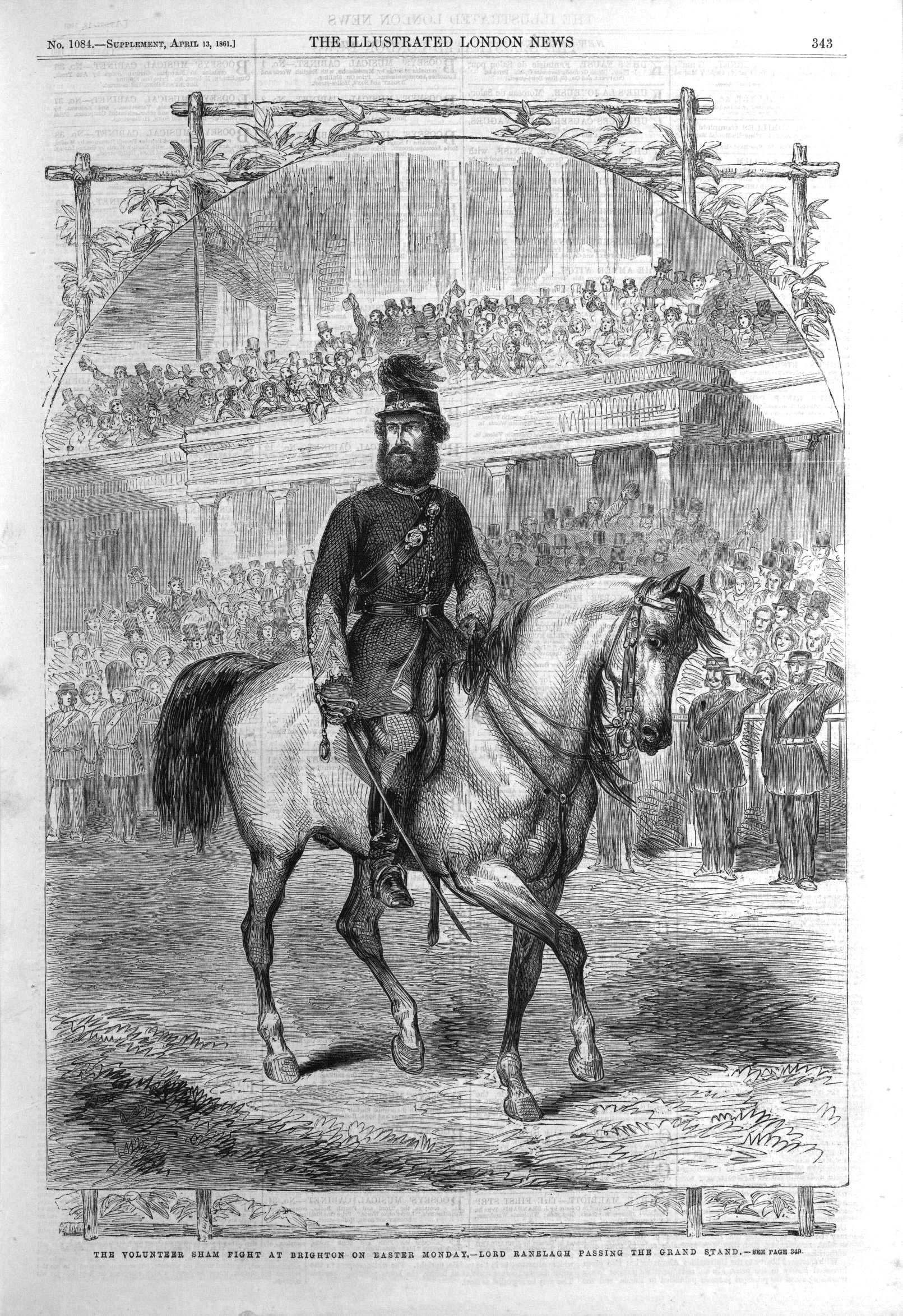
Thomas Heron Jones, 7th Viscount Ranelagh leading the Volunteer gathering in Brighton, 1863, depicted in the Illustrated London News

The large number of small independent corps proved difficult to administer, and, by 1861, most had been formed into battalion-sized units, either by "consolidation": increasing an existing corps to battalion size (usually in large urban areas), or by forming administrative battalions or brigades by the grouping of smaller corps (in rural areas). An official book of drill and rifle instructions for the Corps of Rifle Volunteers and volunteer regulations were published in 1859 and 1861 respectively.

== Cadet Corps ==
From 1860 Cadet Corps were also formed, consisting of school-age boys, which were the forerunners of the Army Cadet Force and Combined Cadet Force. Like the adult volunteers, the boys were supplied with arms by the War Office, for which they had to pay a fee, which reduced the longer they remained members. Cadet Corps were usually associated with private schools. They paraded regularly in public.

== Royal Commission of 1862 ==
In 1862, a royal commission chaired by Viscount Eversley was appointed "to inquire into the condition of the volunteer force in Great Britain and into the probability of its continuance at its existing strength".

According to the report, as of 1 April 1862, the Volunteer Force had a strength of 162,681 consisting of:

- 662 light horse
- 24,363 artillery
- 2,904 engineers
- 656 mounted rifles
- 134,096 rifle volunteers, of whom 48,796 were in 86 consolidated battalions and 75,535 in 134 administrative battalions

Their report made a number of recommendations and observations on funding and training:

- The costs of setting up the volunteer corps had largely been met by public subscription and assistance from honorary members. However the uniforms and equipment were reaching the end of their lives, and the cost of replacement would have to be met by the volunteers themselves, which was likely to lead to many members leaving the force.
- In order to rectify this problem the commission proposed a government grant of 20 shillings per man (30 shillings in the case of artillery), but only on production of a certificate that he had satisfactorily attended a prescribed number of drills in the previous twelve months, had gone through a course of musketry or gunnery instruction, and was present at the annual inspection by a general officer. Grants were not to be made where, on inspection, the volunteer was clearly inefficient, or where his rifle had not been properly maintained.
- Corps that received the grant were to be entitled to spend it on headquarters, drill grounds and halls, transport, maintenance of arms, uniforms and accoutrements. Where the money was to be spent on uniforms, the material used was to be of sealed pattern, and the lord-lieutenant could compel all units of the same arm within the county to adopt a common uniform.
- The commission found that many of the drill instructors employed by the volunteer corps were of poor quality, and recommended the establishment of school of drill instructors. They also suggested that wherever possible volunteers should be united with troops of the line for exercise and instruction

== Volunteer Act 1863 ==
To carry into effect the recommendations of the commission, and to replace the 1804 legislation, the Volunteer Act 1863 (26 & 27 Vict. c. 65) was passed.

Part I of the act dealt with the organisation of the Volunteer Force. It became lawful for "Her Majesty to accept the services of persons desiring to be formed under the act into a Volunteer Corps, and offering their services to Her Majesty through the Lieutenant of a County". On acceptance, the corps would be deemed lawfully formed. Existing corps were to continue under the new act, although the power was given to the Crown to disband any corps. The constitution of a permanent staff consisting of an adjutant and serjeant instructors was permitted for each corps. The grouping of two or more corps into administrative regiments was recognised, and a permanent staff could be provided for the grouping. However the individual corps were to continue to exist. As in the earlier legislation, a volunteer could resign with fourteen days notice, with the addition that if a commanding officer refused to remove a volunteer from the roll of the corps, then he could appeal to two justices of the peace of the county. An annual inspection by an officer of the regular army was instituted, and efficiency standards were to be set by Order in Council, as were regulations for governing the Force. The lord-lieutenant of a county, or the commanding officer of a corps or administrative regiment was empowered to appoint a court of inquiry into any corps, officer, non-commissioned officer or volunteer.

Part II of the act dealt with "Actual Military Service". The terms for calling out of the force were altered: this would now happen in "the case of actual or apprehended invasion of any part of the United Kingdom (the occasion being first communicated to both Houses of Parliament if parliament is sitting, or declared in council and notified by proclamation if parliament is not sitting.)" As well as being entitled to pay and billets, relief was also to be given to the wives and families of volunteers. A bounty of one guinea was to be paid to volunteers on release from actual military service, such release being notified in order by writing by the lord-lieutenant. If disabled on service, officers and volunteers were to receive a pension.

Part III dealt with discipline and part IV with the rules and property of the corps.

Part V dealt with the process of acquiring land for shooting ranges. Apart from the corps taking ownership of the land, a municipal corporation or private company could grant a licence to the volunteers to use their land for the purpose. Justices of the peace were given the power to close rights of way adjacent to ranges.

The act concluded by defining the counties to which the corps were to belong: for the purposes of the act the Isle of Wight, the Tower Hamlets and the Cinque Ports were separate counties, with the Governor of the Isle of Wight, the Constable of the Tower of London and the Lord Warden of the Cinque Ports commissioning officers in place of the lord-lieutenant. The Isle of Man was also to dealt with as if it were a county of England, with the Lieutenant-Governor performing the same role as a county lord-lieutenant.

== Integration ==
In 1872, under the provisions of the Regulation of the Forces Act 1871, jurisdiction over the volunteers was removed from the county lord-lieutenants and placed under the Secretary of State for War. Volunteer units became increasingly integrated with the Regular Army. This culminated in the Childers Reforms of 1881 which nominated rifle volunteer corps as volunteer battalions of the new "county" infantry regiments, which also consisted of regular and militia battalions within a defined regimental district. Over the next few years many of the rifle volunteer corps adopted the "volunteer battalion" designation and the uniform of their parent regiment. This was far from universal, however, with some corps retaining their original names and distinctive dress until 1908.

The artillery volunteers were similarly remodelled as reserve formations of the Royal Artillery, eventually being redesignated as Royal Garrison Artillery (Volunteers) in 1902, while the Engineer Volunteers became Royal Engineers (Volunteers).

== Second Boer War ==
The volunteers finally saw active service during the Second Boer War, when the prolonged campaign necessitated an increase in the size of British forces in South Africa. Volunteer Battalions formed Volunteer Active Service Companies that joined the regular battalions of their county regiments. Following the war, the battle honour "South Africa 1900–02" was awarded to the volunteer units that provided detachments for the campaign.

== The Territorial Force ==
By 1907, when its civilian administration teetered on the brink of insolvency, the Volunteer Force had become indispensable to British defence planning, as well as an enabler of the Regular Army's drawing its own forces away from home defence stations. Consequently, the government passed the Territorial and Reserve Forces Act 1907, which merged the Volunteer Force with the Yeomanry to form the Territorial Force in 1908 (while the Militia was re-organised as the Special Reserve, which provided a body of trained men available for drafting to regular battalions as required during wartime). The total cost of the TF was to be met in future by central government. In addition to the introduction of terms of service for volunteers, most of the units lost their unique identities, becoming numbered territorial battalions of the local army regiment, albeit with distinctive badges or dress distinctions.

The 1907 act did not extend to the Isle of Man, and consequently the 7th (Isle of Man) Volunteer Battalion of The King's (Liverpool Regiment) continued to serve as the only remaining unit of the Volunteer Force until disbandment in 1922. (1868–1922)

== Strength ==
According to the Territorial Year Book 1909, the Volunteer Force had the following strength over its existence:

Year	Establishment	Strength	Classed as efficient
1861	211,961	161,239	140,100
1870	244,966	193,893	170,671
1880	243,546	206,537	196,938
1885	250,967	224,012	218,207
1890	260,310	212,048	212,293
1895	260,968	231,704	224,962
1899	263,416	229,854	223,921
1900	339,511	277,628	270,369
1901	342,003	288,476	281,062
1902	345,547	268,550	256,451
1903	346,171	253,281	242,104
1904	343,246	253,909	244,537
1905	341,283	249,611	241,549
1906	338,452	255,854	246,654
1907	335,849	252,791	244,212

== See also ==
- Category:Units and formations of the Volunteer Force (Great Britain)
- Category:Rifle Volunteer Corps of the British Army
- Category:Artillery Volunteer Corps of the British Army
- Category:Engineer Volunteer Corps of the British Army
- Category:Mounted Rifle Volunteers of the British Army
- Category:Volunteer Infantry Brigades of the British Army
- Category:Volunteer Force officers
- British Volunteer Corps – 1794–1803
- 1st Middlesex Volunteers
- Army Reserve (United Kingdom)
- Militia (United Kingdom)
- Volunteer Training Corps (World War I)
- Home Service Force
- Honourable Artillery Company
- Post Office Rifles
- 1st Nottinghamshire (Robin Hood) Volunteer Rifle Corps (VRC)
- Artists' Rifles
- The Liverpool Scottish
- Halifax Volunteer Battalion, Nova Scotia
- Victoria Rifles (Nova Scotia)
- The Royal Hong Kong Regiment (The Volunteers)
- Cambridgeshire Regiment
- Pre-modern special forces

== Bibliography ==
- Beckett, I F W, 2007. Riflemen Form: A Study of the Rifle Volunteer Movement, 1859–1908, Pen & Sword. ISBN 1844156125
- Beckett, Ian Frederick William (2008). Territorials: A Century of Service. Plymouth: DRA Publishing. ISBN 9780955781315.
- Grierson, James Moncrieff, Lt Gen Gen, 1909. Records of the Scottish Volunteer Force, William Blackwood and Sons.
- Wyatt, Robert J (1974). Collecting Volunteer Militaria. Newton Abbot: David & Charles. ISBN 0715362968.
