= 7th Signal Regiment (United Kingdom) =

'A' Corps Signal Company, Royal Engineers 1st Corps Signal Regiment 7th (Allied Rapid Reaction Corps) Signal Regiment
- Cap badge of the Royal Corps of Signals (post-1954)
- Active: 1884 – 1919; 1923 – 1947; 1959 – 2012
- Country: United Kingdom
- Branch: Army
- Type: Signals
- Role: Allied Rapid Reaction Corps Signals Support
- Size: Regiment
- Part of: I Corps; 1st Signal Brigade
- Garrison/HQ: Aldershot Garrison; Krefeld; Javelin Barracks
- Engagements: Western Front (World War I); Battle of France; North West Europe; 1st Gulf War

The 7th Signal Regiment was a regiment of the Royal Corps of Signals within the British Army. The unit and its predecessors supported 1st (British) Corps from 1911 until the end of the Cold War. Afterwards the regiment supported the Allied Rapid Reaction Corps until its disbandment in 2012.

== Royal Engineers ==
When the Electrical telegraph was brought into use by the British Army during the Crimean War it became the responsibility of the Royal Engineers (RE). In 1884 the RE established a Telegraph Battalion, organised into two 'divisions', of which 2nd Division in London handled communications for the higher levels of command in conjunction with the General Post Office. In 1907 2nd Division was split into a number of separate companies, including 1st Airline and 1st Cable Companies at Aldershot. These merged in 1911 to form 'A' Signal Company at Aldershot to provide communications for I Corps in the event of mobilisation of the British Expeditionary Force (BEF).

== World War I ==
On the outbreak of war in August 1914, 'A' Company embarked for France as I Corps Signals as part of I Corps Troops, Royal Engineers. It consisted of K, L, G and M Sections, under the command of Major M.G.E. Bowman-Manifold as Assistant-Director of Signals. I Corps fought in the Battle of Mons and the subsequent retreat, the Battle of the Aisne and the First Battle of Ypres. On 26 December 1914 the General Officer Commanding (GOC) of I Corps, Sir Douglas Haig was promoted to command a new First Army and began to form his headquarters (HQ). I Corps Signals was split up to provide signals for both HQs. I Corps continued to serve with the BEF on the Western Front for the rest of the war, including the early battles of 1915, the Battle of Loos, the capture of Vimy ridge and Hill 70, the German spring offensive and the Allied Hundred Days Offensive.

On the outbreak of war an Airline Section had the following composition:

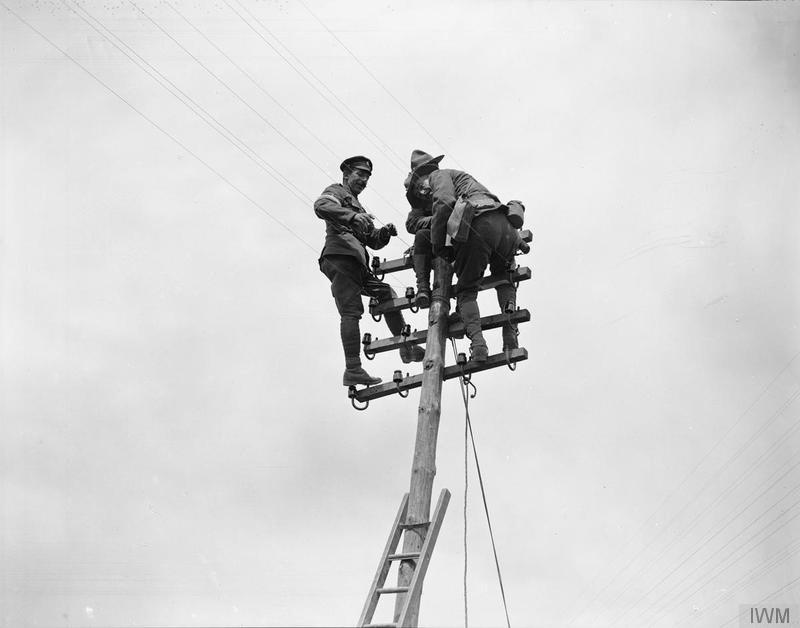
An RE signaller with US Army colleagues setting up air-line signal wires, 1918.

- 1 Officer and 57 other ranks (ORs), 37 horses, 5 wagons, 1 car, 1 bicycle

A Cable Section was composed as follows:

- 1 Officer and 35 ORs, 30 horses, 4 wagons, 1 bicycle

As the war progressed, horsedrawn airline sections were progressively replaced by motorised sections. Sub-units were moved between formations as required: by the end of the war L and M Cable Sections were serving with VIII Corps and GHQ Italy respectively. At the Armistice on 11 November 1918 I Corps Signals were organised as follows:

- 'A' Corps Signal Company
  - No 5 (Motor) Airline Section
  - No 85 (Motor) Airline Section
  - K and AN Cable Sections

AN Cable Section had embarked for France on 3 December 1915, and most of the Motor Airline Sections during 1916.

I Corps HQ and RE staff was disbanded shortly after the Armistice with Germany, and I Corps Signals was reduced to a Cadre.

== Royal Corps of Signals ==
'A' Corps Signals was reconstituted at Aldershot in 1923, now as part of the new Royal Corps of Signals, and was raised to a lieutenant-colonel's command the following year. Until Supplementary Reserve units were raised in the 1920s to take over, 'A' Corps Signals was also responsible for GHQ communications. In 1939, the organisation of Corps Signals was as follows:

- HQ
- 1 Company - for construction
  - 4 line-laying sections
  - 1 line maintenance section
- 2 Company – operating
  - 3 operating sections
  - 3 wireless sections
  - 2 messenger sections (each of 1 Sergeant and 24 despatch riders)
- 3 Company – corps artillery
  - 1 section for each artillery regiment

== World War II ==
=== Battle of France ===
In 1939 the unit went to France again with I Corps as part of the new British Expeditionary Force. After establishing defences along the French frontier during the Phoney War period, the BEF advanced into Belgium in accordance with 'Plan D' initiated after the German offensive in the west opened on 10 May 1940. However, the German Army broke through the Ardennes to the east, forcing the BEF to withdraw again, and by 19 May the whole force was back across the Scheldt and then went back to the so-called 'Canal Line'.

By 26 May the BEF was cut off and the decision was made to evacuate it through Dunkirk (Operation Dynamo). I Corps acted as rearguard, forming a defensive perimeter around the port while the evacuation went on, the last troops that could be rescued leaving on 4 June.

=== Home defence ===
After the evacuation, I Corps was reassembled in Northern Command, becoming responsible for both field forces and coast defence artillery on the Yorkshire and Lincolnshire coast. In 1941 corps signal units were reorganised so that 1 Company supported Main HQ and 2 Company supported Rear HQ. In April 1942 a large part of I Corps Signals was used to reform No 1 Line of Communication Signals (later sent to North Africa in Operation Torch).

I Corps Signals was restored to full strength in 1943 as the corps began training for the planned Allied invasion of Normandy (Operation Overlord). By now corps signal units had disbanded their third company and divided its duties between signal troops assigned to individual artillery regiments and the new Army Groups Royal Artillery (AGRAs). At this point I Corps Signals HQ commanded the following units:

I Corps' formation sign during World War II.

- I Corps Artillery Signal Section
- 13 Cipher Section
- 5 & 58 Despatch Rider Sections
- 1 Line Maintenance Section
- 41, 82, 91 Line Sections
- 60 & 63 Operating Sections
- 44 Signal Park
- 108 Special Wireless Section
- 43 Technical Maintenance Section
- 10 HQ Section (with eight carrier pigeon lofts)
- Inns of Court Regiment Signal Section
- 86 Field Regiment Signal Section
- 62 Anti-Tank Regiment Signal Detachment
- 102 Light Anti-Aircraft Regiment Signal Section
- Light Aid Detachment, Royal Electrical and Mechanical Engineers

In 1944 corps signal regiments organised their sub-units into 1 & 2 Companies supporting Main HQ, a new 3 Company for line construction, and a new 4 Company supporting rear HQ.

=== Normandy ===
I Corps was an assault formation for D Day, attacking with 3rd Division at Sword Beach and 3rd Canadian Division at Juno Beach. Although the GOC, Lieutenant-General John Crocker, landed during the day to visit his divisions, I Corps HQ remained afloat on the HQ ship HMS Hilary to maintain good signal communications until D + 1.

Having failed to seize Caen on D Day, I Corps was engaged in heavy fighting in the area for several weeks. After the liberation of Caen, the corps continued to hold the left flank of the bridgehead, supporting Operation Goodwood, and coming under First Canadian Army as the forces ashore were built up. It continued to support the left while the Canadians advanced on Falaise, and then advanced eastwards along the coast after the breakout from Normandy in late August.

=== Clearing the ports ===
First Canadian Army's' next task was to liberate the Channel ports and make them available to supply 21st Army Group. I Corps took St Valery-en-Caux on 4 September and Le Havre, in Operation Astonia, 10–12 September. It then moved on to Antwerp: the city had quickly fallen to 21st Army Group's advanced elements, but there was a prolonged campaign to clear the approaches to the port, after which I Corps held the line of the River Maas for the winter. (Note: At this period I Corps began to be referred to as I (British) Corps to distinguish it from I Canadian Corps, which joined First Canadian Army in January–February 1945.)

In March 1945 21st Army Group stormed across the Rhine and advanced rapidly across Germany. I Corps' role was limited to liberating the Netherlands and securing the lines of communication for 21st Army Group.

== Postwar ==
After VE Day I Corps took over administration of a very wide area of occupied Germany and the unit became 1st Corps District Signal Regiment of nine squadrons, including one composed of Auxiliary Territorial Service (ATS) women, and two from captured Wehrmacht signal companies. The regiment disbanded in 1947.

The regiment reformed in 1950 at Harewood Barracks at Herford in West Germany to support the newly-formed 1st (British) Corps in British Army of the Rhine. Its initial organisation was HQ Squadron, with A. B. C1, C2, D1, D2, O1, O2, O3, P, Z1 and Z2 Troops. It moved to Maresfiedl Barracks in 1952. In 1956 the regiment (temporarily titled 2nd Corps Signal Rgt) provided a detachment for the Suez operation in 1956.

The familiar name came in 1959 as the regiment adopted the title 7th (Corps) Signal Regiment By now was organised into seven squadrons, comprising over 1000 personnel, providing facilities for 1 (BR) Corps' Main HQ and 'Step Up' (intermediate) HQ. The corps had three divisional HQs and eight brigade HQs under its command, and also had to liaise with adjacent Dutch, Belgian, and West German Corps. The burden was such that in 1962 22 Signal Regiment was re-roled from air support to handle communications for 1 (BR) Corps' Rear HQ, the two regiments working together as the Communications Support Group. Plans to involve a third Signals regiment to provide a full regiment for each of Forward, Step-up and Rear HQs was abandoned in 1967; instead, both regiments were re-organised on a three-squadron basis. 7 Signal Rgt's 6 Sqn left in 1978 to become Bravo Troop in 1st Armoured Division HQ and Signal Regiment.

After the end of the Cold War 1st British Corps was converted into a new multi-national Allied Rapid Reaction Corps (ARRC). As a result 7 Signals Rgt joined the new 1st Signal Brigade and became the main signals regiment for the ARRC. In September 1991 its 1 Squadron deployed to Saudi Arabia to reinforce 1st Armoured Division HQ and Signal Rgt in the 1st Gulf War.

In 2002 the regiment moved to Elmpt and officially joined the Multi-National Division Headquarters in Germany. Eventually, in 2012 as a result of the Future Army Structure (Next Steps) the regiment was disbanded.

In the 1980s and early 1990s the Regiment had 5 Squadrons numbered 1 to 5, with various “out dets” including NATO units such as NORTHAG Air Support Radio Squadron based in Tongeren Belgium, AFCENT in Brunssum Holland. The following was the structure of the regiment from 1993 until disbandment:

- 229 (Berlin) Signal Squadron
- 230 (Malaya) Signal Squadron – moved to 16 Signal Regiment 1994
- 231 Signal Squadron
- 232 Signal Squadron

== Commanding officers ==
Former commanding officers (COs) of the unit include the following:

Assistant-Director of Signals, I Corps

- Maj M.G.E. Bowman-Manifold, 5 August 1914
- Maj D.C. Jones, 20 March 1915
- Maj W.L DeM. Carey, 6 February 1916 (promoted to lt-col 20 November 1916)
- Lt-Col E.F.W. Barker, 26 November 1916
- Lt-Col M.T. Porter, 30 December 1917
- Lt-Col H.G. Gilchrist, 12 December 1918

CO, 'A' Corps Signals

- Maj H.A.B. Salmond, 1923
- Lt-Col R.M. Powell, DSO, 1924
- Lt-Col J.P.G. Worlledge, OBE, 1928
- Maj M.V.G. Fuge, MBE, 1929
- Lt-Col A.E. Meredith, MC, 1930
- Lt-Col R. Elsdale, OBE, MC, 1934
- Lt-Col M.V. Smelt, 1938

CO, 1st Corps Signals

- Lt-Col M.V. Smelt, 1939
- Lt-Col R.H. Hooper, MBE, 1940
- Lt-Col F.S. Whiteway-Wilkinson, 1941
- Lt-Col R. Baron, OBE, TD, 1942
- Lt-Col R.W. Morgan, 1942
- Lt-Col A.F. Freeman, MC, 1944

CO, 1st Corps District Signal Regiment

- Lt-Col D.N. Deakin, 1945
- Lt-Col A.S. Milner, OBE, 1946–47

CO 1st Corps Signal Regiment

- Lt-Col G.D.B. MacKean, 1950
- Lt-Col P.E.M. Bradley, DSO, MBE, 1952
- Lt-Col F.P. Johnson, OBE, 1953

== Insignia ==
In 1995 7 Signal Regiment adopted a regimental shoulder flash consisting of a white spear on a red diamond (the old 1st British Corps (1BR Corps) formation sign) superimposed on a background of the corps colours of the Royal Corps of Signals.

== Alliances ==
In September 1972 the regiment was awarded the Freedom of the City of Herford and in 1997 of Krefeld, strengthening its ties with the western German areas.

The unit had the following alliances:

- New Zealand -1st Divisional Signal Regiment, Royal New Zealand Corps of Signals
- Belgium - 4th Troupes de Transmissions Battalion, Belgian Signal Battalion
- France - 51^{e} Régiment de Transmissions, French Army
- Germany - 310 Fernmeldebataillon, German Army
- United States - 17th Signal Battalion, United States Army

== External sources ==
- British Army units from 1945 on
