= I Corps Troops, Royal Engineers =

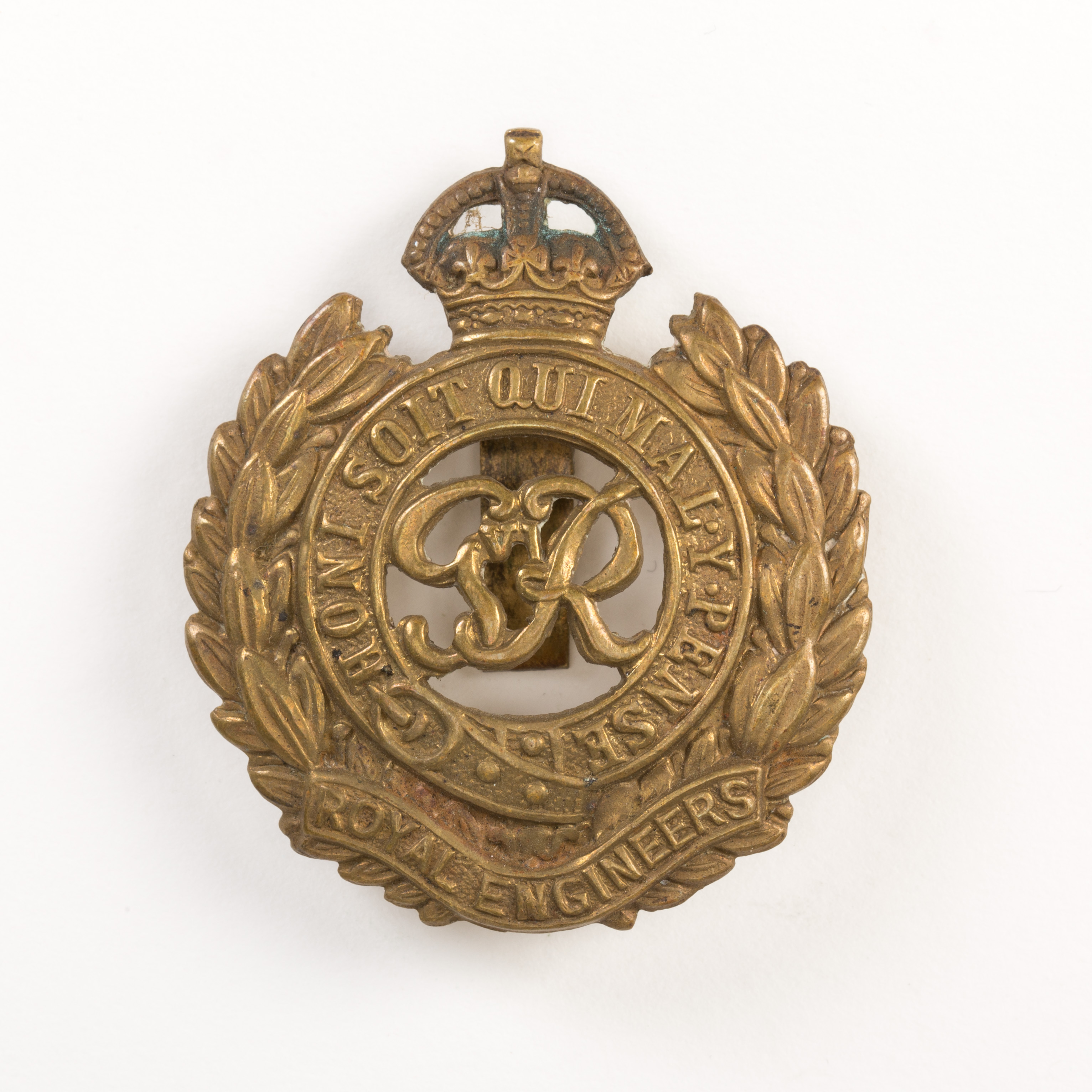
- RE Cap badge (King George VI cipher)
- Active: 1939–1946; 1958–1992
- Country: United Kingdom
- Branch: British Army
- Role: Corps engineers
- Part of: I Corps; British Army of the Rhine
- Garrison/HQ: Aldershot; Bielefeld
- Engagements: Operation Goodwood; Operation Astonia; Battle of the Scheldt

I Corps Troops, Royal Engineers (I CTRE) was a battalion-sized unit of Royal Engineers (RE) attached to the British I Corps Headquarters in World War II. It served with the British Expeditionary Force in the Battle of France and Dunkirk evacuation, and later with 21st Army Group during the campaign in North West Europe 1944–45 from D Day until the German surrender at Lüneburg Heath. It later served in British Army of the Rhine.

== Precursor units ==
Following the Cardwell Reforms a mobilisation scheme began to appear in the Army List from December 1875. This assigned all Regular Army and Militia units serving in the UK to a theoretical order of battle of eight army corps. The only all-Regular corps, I Corps based at Colchester, had the following units of the Royal Engineers (RE) assigned as Corps Engineers:

- A Troop at Aldershot (Pontoons)
- Half of C Troop at Aldershot (Telegraphs)
- 12th Company and field park at Chatham, Kent

During 1876 12th Co was replaced by 31st Co.

The 1875 plan was over-ambitious: there were not enough engineers for eight corps and no staff; although there was a post for a Colonel Commanding Royal Engineers with I Corps, the position remained vacant. The Childers Reforms of 1881 only provided for an overseas expeditionary force of one complete army corps, and the revised mobilisation plan of 1886 (codified in the subsequent Stanhope Memorandum of 1891) allowed for an expeditionary force of two army corps, each with a 'field battalion' of RE sappers. In 1887 1st Field Battalion supporting I Corps comprised 7th, 11th, 17th and 23rd Field Companies. The field battalions were shortlived: in 1898 the RE component of each corps was supposed to comprise a pontoon troop, a telegraph division, a balloon section, a field company, a field park and a railway company. The corps remained paper arrangements only, without assigned staff, and when the Second Boer War broke out in 1899 the formations and units assigned to I Corps (now based at Aldershot) proceeded overseas separately, and never concentrated in South Africa.

After the Boer War the Haldane Reforms of 1908 established an expeditionary force of six divisions with a detailed mobilisation scheme, so that every unit had a defined position in the order of battle and mobilisation was regularly practised. The divisions became permanent formations, but only I Corps among higher formations had the nucleus of a staff, which was provided from Aldershot Command.

== World War I ==
When mobilisation began on 5 August 1914, the Chief Engineer (CE) of Aldershot Command, Temporary Brigadier-General S.R. Rice, was immediately appointed CE of I Corps and went with it to France. At this date the RE was responsible for the Army's Signal Service, and Major M.G.E. Bowman-Manifold also went as Assistant-Director of Signals for I Corps.

As the British Expeditionary Force assembled in France, the following RE troops from Aldershot Command were assigned to I Corps:

- 'A' Signal Company (1st Corps Signal Company)
  - K, L, G and D Sections
- No 2 Section, Line of Communications Printing Section
- No 1 Bridging Train

I Corps served on the Western Front throughout the war. RE units were assigned to the corps as required for operations, but by 1916 each corps had two 'army troops' companies, one tunnelling company and one special works company. In September 1918 CE I Corps had the following units under command:

- 133rd Army Troops Company
- 135th Army Troops Company
- 290th Army Troops Company
- 560th (Hampshire) Army Troops Company
- 170th Tunnelling Company
- 3rd Australian Tunnelling Company

At the Armistice on 11 November 1918 I Corps signals were organised as follows:

- 'A' Corps Signal Company
  - No 5 (Motor) Airline Section
  - No 85 (Motor) Airline Section
  - K Cable Section
  - AN Cable Section

I Corps HQ and its CE staff were disbanded shortly after the Armistice, though 'A' Corps Signals continued in the new Royal Corps of Signals after 1922.

== World War II ==
=== Mobilisation ===
When I Corps Headquarters mobilised on the outbreak of war in September 1939 it was assigned the following units as I Corps Troops Royal Engineers (I CTRE) under Lieutenant-Colonel G.R. Pim as Commander Royal Engineers (CRE):

- 13 Corps Field Survey Company at Southampton from the Survey Battalion, RE (Regular Army) (Note: The Survey Battalion, RE, included all the RE employed at the Ordnance Survey at Southampton.)
- 102 (London) Army Field Company at Bethnal Green (Supplementary Reserve)
- 105 (West Lancashire) Corps Field Park Company at Liverpool (Supplementary Reserve)
- 107 (North Riding) Army Field Company at Middlesbrough (Supplementary Reserve)
- 221 (2nd London) Army Field Company at Chelsea from the London Division (Territorial Army)

=== Battle of France ===
I Corps embarked for France with the British Expeditionary Force and began taking over a section of the frontier defences on 3 October 1939. I CTRE spent the early weeks on tasks around Corps HQ in the Douai area. Then the engineers spent the Phoney War period working on defensive positions. I CTRE attached 221st Fd Co to 1st Division as an additional field company. Its role on the outbreak of hostilities, in conjunction with 1st Division's bridging section, was to open the road from Tournai to Brussels and maintain an important canal crossing.

When the German offensive in the west opened on 10 May 1940, the BEF advanced into Belgium in accordance with 'Plan D'. 221st Field Co found itself in the lead, advancing ahead of the scouting armoured cars. However, the German Army broke through the Ardennes to the east, forcing the BEF to withdraw again, and by 19 May the whole force was back across the Escaut and then went back to the so-called 'Canal Line'. The engineers carried out as many bridge demolitions as possible to delay the German advance. 221st Field Co was tasked with destroying bridges along a 10 km stretch of the Brussels–Charleroi Canal to delay the German advance, then to prepare a 'stop line' on the La Bassée Canal.

By 26 May the BEF was cut off and the decision was made to evacuate it through Dunkirk (Operation Dynamo). I Corps acted as rearguard, the sappers blowing bridges and cratering roads to form a defensive perimeter. Because it was unable to fulfil its usual role of supplying maps, 13th Field Survey Company was sent with the Corps armoured car regiment, 12th Lancers, on 27 May to defend Veurne, where the Belgian commander insisted that he required no help. However, on 29 May the Belgian Army capitulated, leaving a wide gap in the perimeter along the Yser. This gap was filled by the 12th Lancers, a few French troops, and by 13th Field Survey Company and 101st Field Company of I CTRE. They succeeded in blowing all the Yser bridges except at Nieuwpoort, where the Germans already had a bridgehead despite the efforts of the Lancers and Survey Company. However, the enemy were prevented from exploiting this bridgehead.

The BEF fought to maintain the shrinking perimeter round Dunkirk while the evacuation went on each unit in turndestroying its vehicles and stores before boarding a variety of vessels. One party of 221st Fd Co was on the Queen of the Channel, which was bombed and sunk on 28 May: the passengers and crew were picked up and taken to England aboard the Dorrien Rose. Another party from the company arrived in England the following day on HMS Greyhound. The last troops of the BEF who could be rescued left on 4 June.

=== Home Defence ===
After the evacuation, I Corps was reassembled in Northern Command, becoming responsible for both field forces and coast defence artillery on the Yorkshire and Lincolnshire coast. I CTRE was reformed, but 13 Field Survey Co transferred to Northern Command HQ and 221 Field Co returned to the London Division, being replaced by 213 (North Midland) Army Fd Co from 46th (North Staffordshire) CTRE. 277 Corps Field Park Co was also assigned for a while from December 1941.

In July 1943 II Corps was disbanded and II CTRE merged with I CTRE. 102 and 107 Field Cos were sent to the Mediterranean Theatre and were replaced by 234 and 240 Fd Cos from II CTRE, while 19 Fd Co joined, having been converted from a field squadron. (Note: By retaining its number, the former 19 Fd Sqn created a numerical duplication with the existing 19 Fd Survey Co.) For the rest of the war I CTRE was organised as follows:

- 19 Field Co – from 79th Armoured Division
- 234 (Northumbrian) Field Co – from II CTRE
- 240 (Lowland) Field Co – from II CTRE
- 105 (West Lancashire) Field Park Co

From now on, I Corps formed part of Second Army in 21st Army Group, training for the planned Allied invasion of Normandy (Operation Overlord) in 1944. Indeed, I Corps' staff had been studying the engineering problems of an opposed landing since December 1941.

=== Normandy ===
I Corps was an assault formation for D Day, attacking with 3rd Division at Sword Beach and 3rd Canadian Division at Juno Beach. While I CTRE under its CRE, Lt-Col R.W.F. Poole, was kept under the direct command of I Corps HQ, a platoon of 19th Field Co was attached to 3rd Canadian Division to assist with beach obstacle clearance once the landings had been made.

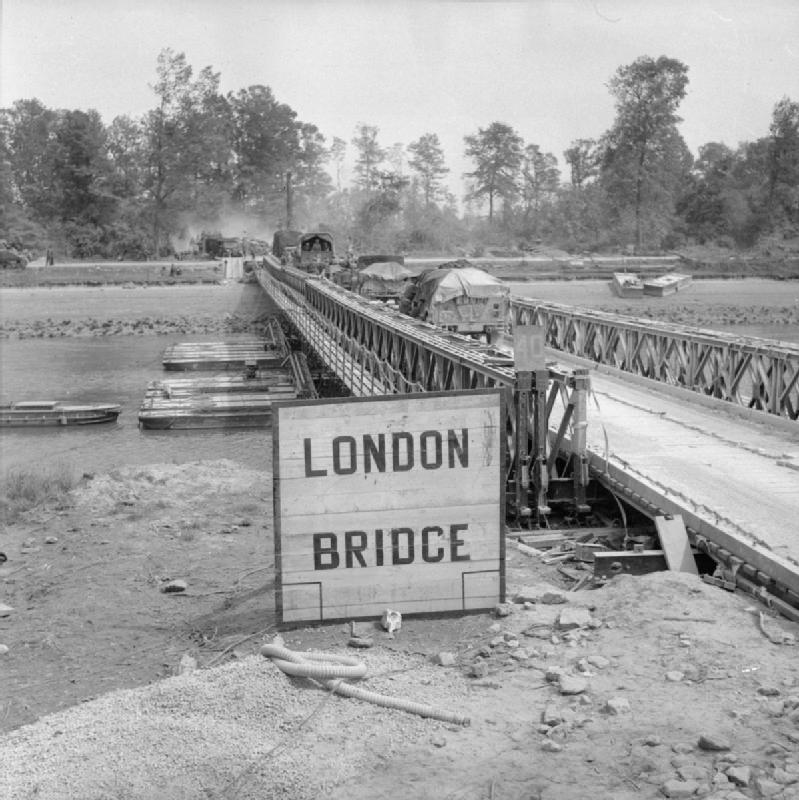
Transport crossing 'London Bridge' into the Orne bridgehead during Operation Goodwood.

Having failed to seize Caen on D Day, I Corps was engaged in heavy fighting in the area for several weeks. I CTRE's most important role was to increase the bridge capacity across the River Orne and the Caen Canal into the bridgehead captured on D Day by 6th Airborne Division. By the beginning of July three pairs of bridges were in place:

- A 375 feet (114 m) Class 40 Bailey Pontoon bridge ('York I') built over the locks at Ouistreham by 234 Fd Co and 7 Fd Co (of 6th Army Troops RE), and its continuation ('York II') over the Orne by the same companies
- The bridges captured by the airborne forces on D Day, Pegasus and Ranville
- Two Class 40 bridges to duplicate Pegasus and Ranville ('London I' and 'London II'), built on 10–11 June by 71 Fd Co and 263 Fd Co (of XII CTRE)

Now these were to be supplemented by further work, for which task Poole also had at his disposal five field companies from 18th GHQ Troops, RE (74, 84, 91, 173 and 213) and two from 8th GHQ TRE (89 and 90):

- Replacement bridges at Ouistreham Locks ('Tower I' by 19 Fd Co) and its continuation over the Orne ('Tower II' by 234 and 240 Fd Cos)
- Strengthening Pegasus and Ranville to take Class 40 loads
- A pair of Class 40 Bailey bridges ('Tay I' and 'Tay II') at Blainville-sur-Orne, 2 miles (3.2 km) upstream from Pegasus and Ranville, by 89 and 90 Fd Cos.

This additional work had to be carried out in secret, so that five Class 40 routes would be available for VIII Corps' tanks to move into the Airborne bridgehead to launch Operation Goodwood on 18 July. Stores were brought up in advance and concealed, and the actual construction was carried out during the night of 17/18 July. The associated work involved a great deal of improvement to roads and tracks, and lifting of minefields that blocked the routes of advance, and the RE of the attacking divisions had to help out. Although 'Goodwood' failed to achieve a breakthrough, the engineering operations provided a firm base from which I Corps advanced eastwards once the breakout from Normandy was finally achieved in late August. By this time, First Canadian Army had been activated, and I Corps came under its command.

=== Clearing the ports ===
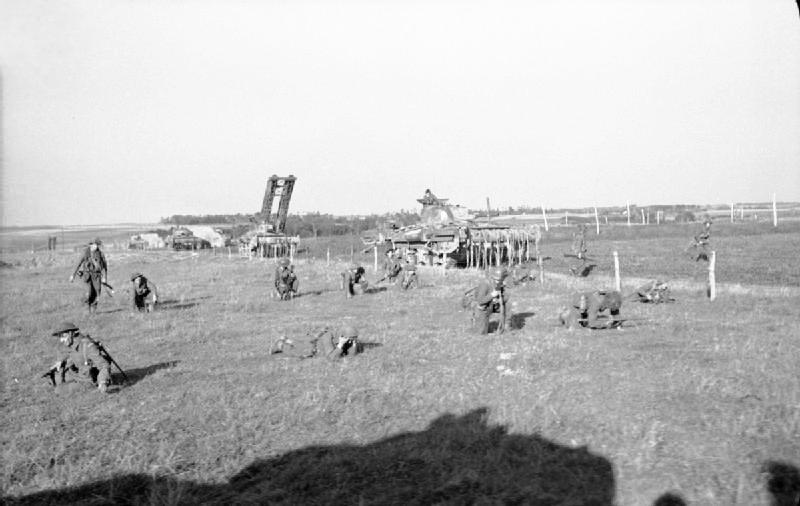
Tanks, infantry and sappers advance during Operation Astonia

First Canadian Army's next task was to liberate the Channel ports and make them available to supply 21st Army Group. The first of these were captured by I Corps: St Valery-en-Caux on 4 September and Le Havre, in Operation Astonia, 10–12 September. The initial attack at Le Havre was launched by 56th Brigade of 49th (West Riding) Infantry Division, supported by 240 Fd Co of I CTRE and led by the AVREs of 42 Assault Regiment, RE. 'Astonia' was very much a sapper's operation: the port was heavily fortified, but despite setbacks the set-piece operation went well, the defences were overrun and the town captured in 48 hours.

First Canadian Army then moved on to Antwerp: the city had quickly fallen to 21st Army Group's advanced elements, but there was a prolonged campaign to clear the approaches to the port, after which I Corps held the line of the River Maas for the winter. (Note: At this period I Corps began to be referred to as I (British) Corps to distinguish it from I Canadian Corps, which joined First Canadian Army in January–February 1945.)

=== Germany ===
In March 1945 21st Army Group stormed across the Rhine and advanced rapidly across Germany. I Corps' role was limited to liberating the Netherlands and securing the lines of communication for 21st Army Group. The German surrender at Lüneburg Heath on 4 May did not end the work for the sappers: for many months they were engaged in repair and restoration of essential services behind the armies and in the occupied zone of Germany. The CE of I Corps had a month to devise a method of clearing 130 wrecked bridges from the Weser to open it to river traffic.

On 21 May 1945, I Corps was redesignated I Corps district, responsible for Rhine Province and Westphalia as part of British Army of the Rhine (BAOR). In 1946 BAOR built a major (1,530 feet (470 m)) semi-permanent bridge over the River Elbe at Artlenburg, partly as a training exercise. 105 Field Park Company took part, attached to 5th Division, and was responsible for collecting stores before site preparation began on 1 August 1946. The 30-span bridge (Bailey sections on timber trestles) was completed between 12 August and 16 September. I Corps was disbanded in 1947; its RE companies all appear to have been disbanded in 1945–6.

== Postwar ==
I (British) Corps was reactivated in BAOR in 1951, and its Corps CRE's HQ reformed as I CCRE at Bielefeld in 1958. In 1969 it replaced 11 Engineer Brigade as the command element for most GHQ RE units in BAOR until 1976 when 11 Engineer Bde was reformed. I (BR) Corps was disbanded in 1992.

== Commanders ==
Commanders of I Corps RE included:

Chief Engineer (CE), I Corps:

- Brig-Gen S.R. Rice, 5 August 1914
- Brig-Gen C. Godby, 11 April 1915
- Brig-Gen R.P. Lee, 14 September 1915
- Brig-Gen E.H.deV. Atkinson 18 May 1918
- Brig-Gen H.W. Gordon, 31 October 1917

Commanding Royal Engineer (CRE), I CTRE:

- Lt-Col G.R. Pim, September 1939
- Lt-Col R.W.F. Poole, June 1944

== Insignia ==
During World War II, I CTRE wore the normal formation badge of I Corps, consisting of a white spearhead on a red diamond, but with two dark blue diagonal stripes added.
