= II Corps Troops, Royal Engineers =

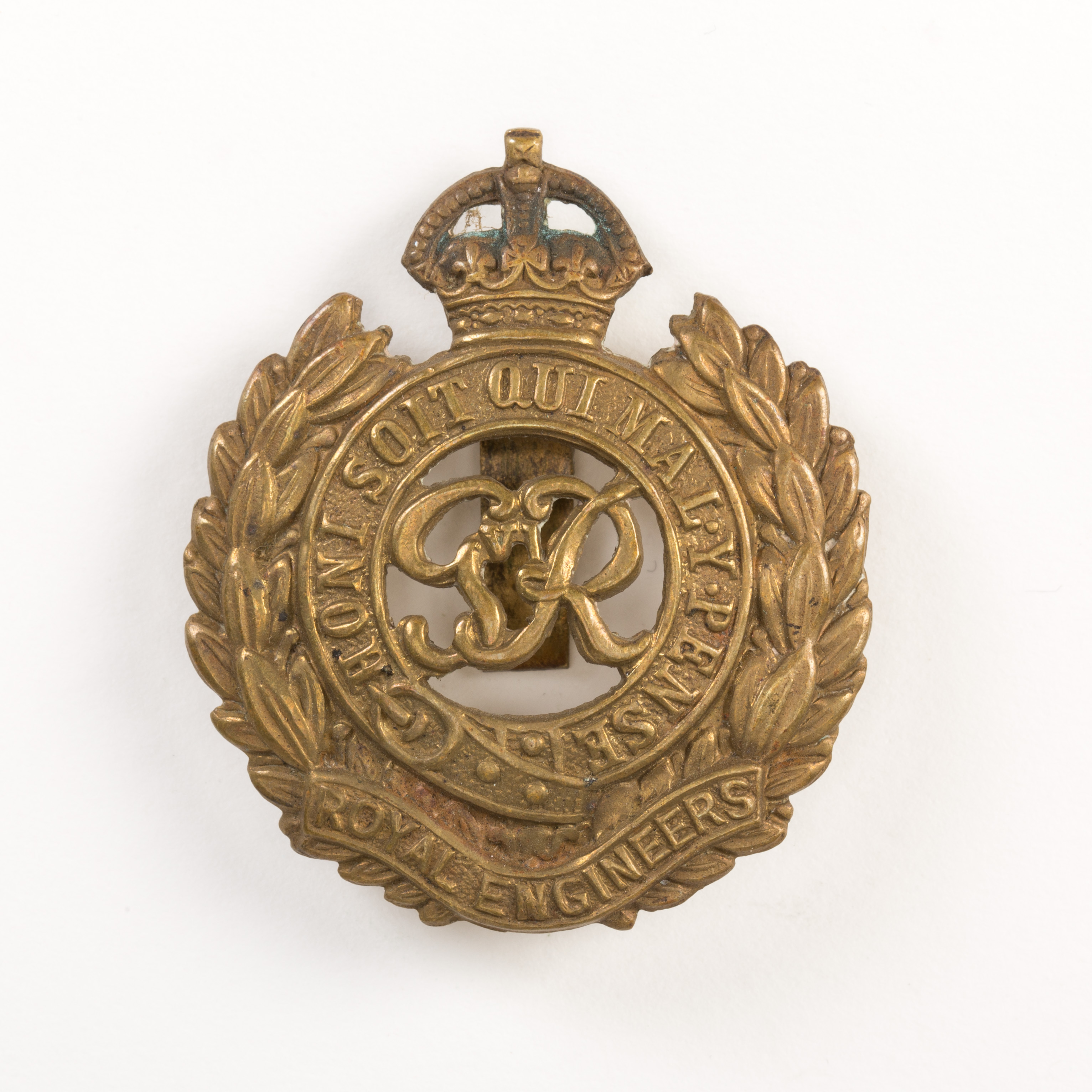
- RE Cap badge (King George VI cipher)
- Active: 1940–1943
- Country: United Kingdom
- Branch: British Army
- Role: Corps engineers
- Part of: II Corps
- Engagements: Battle of France; Dunkirk evacuation

II Corps Troops, Royal Engineers (II CTRE) was a battalion-sized unit of Royal Engineers (RE) attached to the British II Corps Headquarters in World War II. It served with the British Expeditionary Force in the Battle of France and Dunkirk evacuation, and later in Home Defence until disbandment in 1943.

== Precursor units ==
Following the Cardwell Reforms a mobilisation scheme began to appear in the Army List from December 1875. This assigned all Regular Army and Militia units serving in the UK to a theoretical order of battle of eight army corps. II Army Corps based at Aldershot was to have the following units of the Royal Engineers (RE) assigned as Corps Engineers:

- A pontoon troop
- Half a telegraph troop
- A field company and field park

The 1875 plan was over-ambitious: there were not enough engineers for eight corps and no staff; although there was a post for a Colonel Commanding Royal Engineers with II Corps, the position remained vacant. The only RE unit actually assigned to II Corps was half of C (Telegraph) Troop at Aldershot. The Childers Reforms of 1881 only provided for an overseas expeditionary force of one complete army corps, but the revised mobilisation plan of 1886 (codified in the subsequent Stanhope Memorandum of 1891) allowed for an expeditionary force of two army corps, each with a 'field battalion' of RE sappers. In 1887 2nd Field Battalion supporting II Corps comprised 12th, 26th, 37th and 38th Field Companies.

The field battalions were short-lived: by 1898 the RE component of each corps was supposed to comprise a pontoon troop, a telegraph division, a balloon section, a field company, a field park and a railway company. The corps remained paper arrangements only, without assigned staff, and when the Second Boer War broke out in 1899 the formations and units assigned to the army corps proceeded overseas separately, and never concentrated in South Africa.

After the Boer War the Haldane Reforms of 1908 established an expeditionary force of six divisions with a detailed mobilisation scheme, so that every unit had a defined position in the order of battle and mobilisation was regularly practised. The divisions became permanent formations, but II Corps HQ had to be improvised from the staffs of Eastern Command and Southern Command for the Army Manoeuvres of 1912, and again when the British Expeditionary Force (BEF) was mobilised on the outbreak of World War I.

== World War I ==
When mobilisation began on 5 August 1914, the Chief Engineer (CE) of Irish Command, Temporary Brigadier-General A.E. Sandbach, was immediately appointed CE of II Corps and went with it to France. At this date the RE was responsible for the Army's Signal Service, and Major A.B.R. Hildebrand also went as Assistant-Director of Signals for II Corps.

As the BEF assembled in France, the following RE troops were assigned to II Corps:

- 2nd Corps Signal Company
  - E, M, O and P Sections
- No 2 Bridging Train

II Corps served on the Western Front throughout the war. RE units were assigned to the corps as required for operations, but by 1916 each corps had two 'army troops' companies, one tunnelling company and one special works company. In September 1918 CE II Corps had the following units under command:

- 20th Army Troops Company
- 138th Army Troops Company
- 289th Army Troops Company
- 556th (Glamorgan) Army Troops Company
- 255th Tunnelling Company

At the Armistice on 11 November 1918 II Corps Signals were organised as follows:

- 'B' Corps Signal Company
  - No 33 (Motor) Airline Section
  - No 83 (Motor) Airline Section
  - AP Cable Section
  - J Cable Section

II Corps formed part of the British Army of the Rhine after the Armistice. Its HQ and CE staff were disbanded about November 1919.

== World War II ==
=== Mobilisation ===
II Corps' formation sign during World War II.

II Corps was mobilised again when a new British Expeditionary Force was sent to France at the beginning of World War II. II Corps was assigned a mixed group of RE companies as II Corps Troops, RE (II CTRE) under the command of Lt-Col P.F. Foley:

- 14 Corps Field Survey Company – mobilised at Southampton from the Survey Battalion, RE, (Regular Army) (Note: The Survey Battalion, RE, included all the RE personnel employed at the Ordnance Survey at Southampton.)
- 222 (2nd London) Army Field Company – at Chelsea from London Division (Territorial Army (TA))
- 234 (Northumbrian) Army Field Company – at Gateshead from GHQ Troops (TA)
- 240 (Lowland) Army Field Company – at Coatbridge from 52nd (Lowland) Infantry Division (TA)
- 108 (Essex) Corps Field Park Company – at Chelmsford, from GHQ Troops (Supplementary Reserve)

In mid-September the companies assembled at Savannah Barracks, Bordon Camp, and collected motor transport (MT), both from Chilwell ordnance depot and requisitioned civilian vehicles from Guildford. The transport then moved to Southampton to embark for France, 222 Fd Co aboard the troopship Manxman bound for Cherbourg.

=== Battle of France ===
Once concentrated, II Corps moved on 12 October up to the French frontier, where the sappers spent the Phoney War period on defence works to extend the Maginot Line. II CTRE assigned 222 Field Co to assist 3rd Division at Bouvines. When the German offensive in the west opened on 10 May 1940. the BEF advanced into Belgium in accordance with 'Plan D'. 222nd Field Co immediately went forward to blow the Dyle bridges round Louvain.

However, the German Army broke through the Ardennes to the east, forcing the BEF to withdraw again, and by 19 May the whole force was back across the Escaut and then went back to the so-called 'Canal Line'. The engineers carried out as many bridge demolitions as possible to delay the German advance.

By 26 May the BEF was cut off and the decision was made to evacuate it through Dunkirk (Operation Dynamo), with II Corps acting as flank guard against the German penetration where the Belgian Army had surrendered. The last of the BEF who could enter the Dunkirk bridgehead had done so by 29 May and the evacuation progressed: III Corps went first, followed by II Corps after handing over responsibility for the eastern flank to the rearguards of I Corps. 222 Field Co reached Bray-Dunes on 30 May and was embarked on several vessels, most on HMS Calcutta, which landed them at Sheerness next day, others party aboard HMS Halcyon, which landed them at Dover. Various detached demolition parties came back later. Most of II Corps including the rest of II CTRE was evacuated on the night of 31 May/1 June.

=== Home Defence ===
After the evacuation, the companies of II CTRE reassembled at Blandford Camp, then II Corps concentrated in East Anglia under Eastern Command and concentrated on building defence works – described by General Ironside (Commander-in-Chief, Home Forces) as 'minor Maginot Lines along the coast' – in which task the RE was assisted by large numbers of civilian contractors. 14 Field Survey Company left, and on 16 July 222 Fd Co returned to 2nd London Division, but in September II CTRE was reinforced by the arrival of 173 Railway Tunnelling Company.

II Corps continued in Eastern England during 1941–43, preparing for an invasion that never came. 173 Tunnelling Company left II CTRE during 1941 (it later served in the Siege of Malta). By the middle of 1943 most of the fighting units in Britain had been sent to overseas theatres or were assigned to 21st Army Group for the planned invasion of Normandy (Operation Overlord). II Corps had no role in these plans and in July 1943 II Corps HQ was disbanded (it retained a notional existence as a deception formation in Operation Fortitude North) and its units dispersed. II Corps Troops RE merged with I CTRE, with 234 and 240 Fd Cos joining the latter and later taking part in Overlord. Brigadier P.F. Foley, who had commanded II CTRE during the Battle of France, went on to be Chief Engineer (CE) of 'Fortbase', the administrative echelon of 15th Army Group in the Allied invasion of Sicily, and CE Works during the Italian Campaign.
