= Saint-Valery-en-Caux station =

Railway station in Saint-Valery-en-Caux, France

Saint-Valery-en-Caux
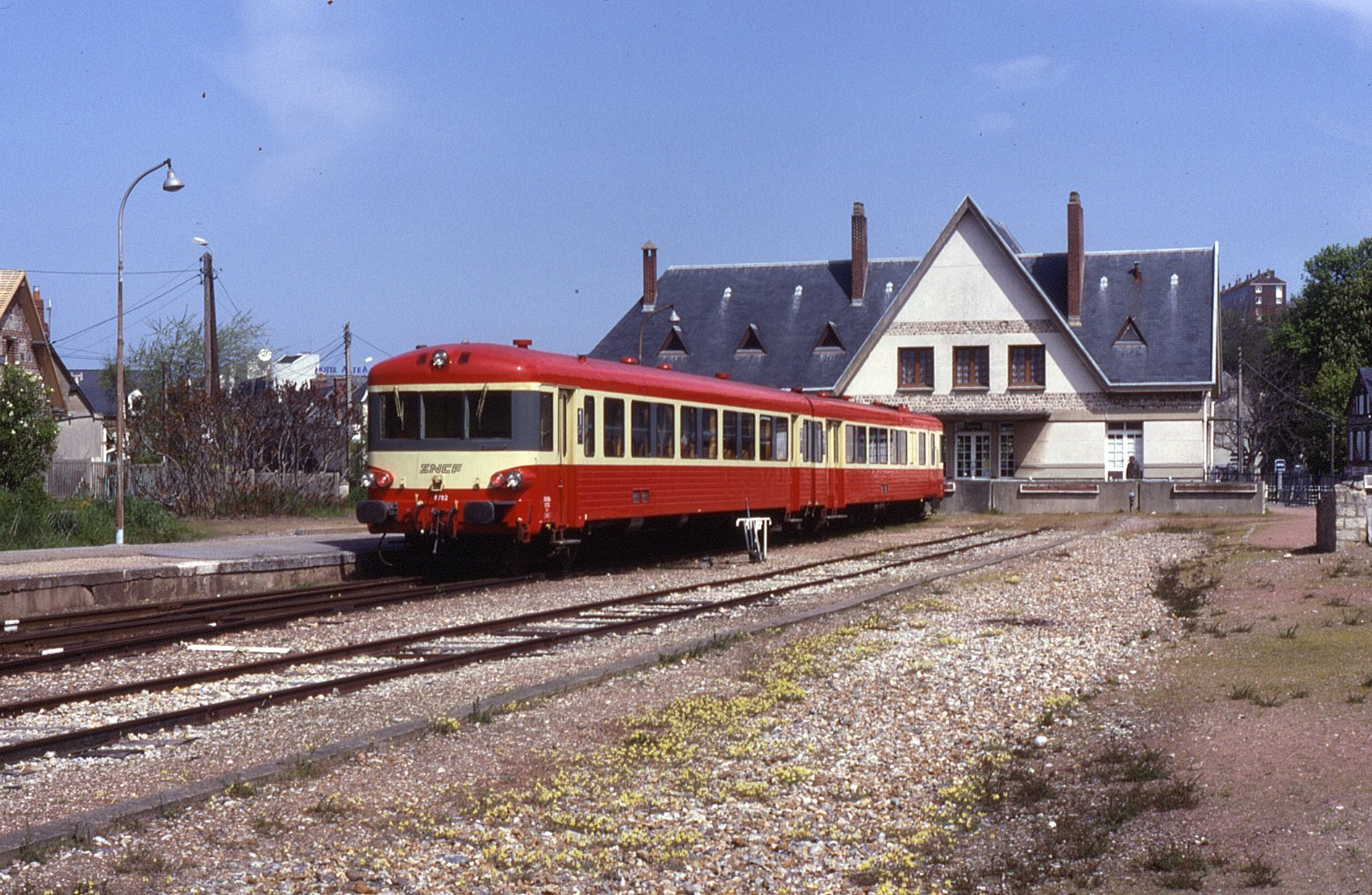
- Saint-Valery-en-Caux railway station

General information
- Location: Saint-Valery-en-Caux, Seine-Maritime, Upper Normandy, France
- Coordinates: 49°51′41″N 0°42′46″E
- Line: Motteville-Saint-Valery-en-Caux railway
- Platforms: 2
- Tracks: 2

History
- Closed: 1996
Location

Saint-Valery-en-Caux is a former railway station in Saint-Valery-en-Caux, Upper Normandy, France. The station was located on the former Motteville to Saint-Valery-en-Caux railway. Trains ceased using the station in 1996, but as is often the case in France , the ticket office remained open for parcels and tickets for the rail replacement buses. The station was served by train services between Rouen and Saint-Valery-en-Caux.

== History ==
The terminus station of Saint-Valery-en-Caux was opened on 11 June 1880, by the Chemins de fer de l'Ouest, when it began operating its line from Motteville to Saint-Valery-en-Caux.
