= I Corps (United Kingdom) =

Inactive British Army formation

- I Corps formation badge during the Second World War.
- Active: 1815–1994
- Country: United Kingdom
- Branch: British Army
- Type: Field corps
- Engagements: Waterloo Campaign: Battle of Quatre Bras; Battle of Waterloo; First World War: Battle of Mons; Battle of the Marne; Battle of the Aisne; First Battle of Ypres; Battle of Aubers Ridge; Battle of Festubert; Battle of Loos; The Bluff and St Eloi; Battle of the Somme 1916; Battle of the Ancre; German Retreat to the Hindenburg Line 1917; Battle of Arras; Battle of the Lys; The Final Advance in Artois; Second World War: Retreat to Dunkirk 1940; Invasion of Normandy; Battle for Caen; Battle of the Scheldt; Cold War: British Army of the Rhine

Commanders
- Notable commanders: The Prince of Orange; Sir Douglas Haig; Sir Charles Monro; Sir Hubert Gough; Sir Arthur Holland; Sir John Dill; Sir Harold Alexander; Sir John Crocker

Insignia
- Corps formation sign during the First World War.

I Corps ("First Corps") was an army corps in existence as an active formation in the British Army for most of the 80 years from its creation in the First World War until the end of the Cold War, longer than any other corps. It had a short-lived precursor during the Waterloo Campaign. It served as the operational component of the British Army of the Rhine (part of NATO's Northern Army Group (NORTHAG)) during the Cold War, and was tasked with defending West Germany.

== Napoleonic precursor ==
Assembling an army in Belgium to fight Napoleon's resurgent forces in the spring of 1815, the Duke of Wellington formed it into army corps, deliberately mixing units from the Anglo-Hanoverian, Dutch-Belgian and German contingents so that the weaker elements would be stiffened by more experienced or reliable troops. As he put it: 'It was necessary to organize these troops in brigades, divisions, and corps d’armee with those better disciplined and more accustomed to war'. He placed I Corps under the command of the Prince of Orange and it was this corps that was first contacted by the advancing French at Quatre Bras on 16 June 1815. However, Wellington did not employ the corps as tactical entities, and continued his accustomed practice of issuing orders directly to divisional and lower commanders. When he drew up his army on the ridge at Waterloo, elements of the various corps were mixed up, and although he gave the Prince of Orange nominal command of the centre, that officer had different forces under him. Subsequent to the battle, the corps structure was re-established for the advance into France, I Corps being commanded by Maj-Gen Sir John Byng, the Prince of Orange having been wounded at Waterloo.

=== Composition of I Corps in the Waterloo Campaign ===
General Officer Commanding (GOC): General The Prince of Orange

- 1st (British) Division (British Guards)
- 3rd (British) Division (Anglo-Hanoverian)
- 2nd (Netherlands) Division (Dutch-Belgian)
- 3rd (Netherlands) Division (Dutch-Belgian)

== Prior to the First World War ==
After Waterloo the army corps structure largely disappeared from the British Army, except for ad hoc formations assembled during annual manoeuvres (e.g. Army Manoeuvres of 1913). In 1876 a Mobilisation Scheme for eight army corps was published, with 'First Corps' based on Colchester. In 1880 First Corps' organization was:

- 1st Division (Colchester)
  - 1st Brigade (Colchester)
    - 1st Bn. 2nd Foot (Colchester), 1st Bn. 10th Foot (Colchester)
  - 2nd Brigade (Colchester)
    - 1st Bn. 9th Foot (Kinsale), 28th Foot (Fermoy)
  - Divisional Troops
    - 2nd Bn. 12th Foot (Portsmouth), Buckinghamshire Yeomanry (Buckingham), 1st Company Royal Engineers (Shorncliffe)
  - Artillery
    - F/1st Brigade Royal Artillery (Ipswich), D/1st Brigade RA (Woolwich)
- 2nd Division (Chelmsford)
  - 1st Brigade (Chelmsford)
    - 1st Bn. 15th Foot (Tipperary), 47th Foot (The Curragh)
  - 2nd Brigade (Warley)
    - 1st Bn. 3rd Foot (Shorncliffe), 49th Foot (Dover), 55th Foot (Shorncliffe)
  - Divisional Troops
    - 1st Bn. 23rd Foot (Woolwich), Hertfordshire Yeomanry (St Albans), 20th Company Royal Engineers (Chatham)
  - Artillery
    - I/4th Brigade RA (Newcastle), N/4th Brigade RA (Woolwich), M/4th Brigade RA (Newcastle)
- 3rd Division (Gravesend)
  - 1st Brigade (Gravesend)
    - 77th Foot (Dublin), 104th Foot (Belfast), 105th Foot (Newry)
  - 2nd Brigade (Chatham)
    - 2nd Bn. 5th Foot (Chatham), 31st Foot (Chatham), 86th Foot (Chatham)
  - Divisional Troops
    - 87th Foot (Limerick), West Kent Yeomanry (Maidstone), 22nd Company Royal Engineers (Woolwich)
  - Artillery
    - O/4th Brigade RA (Weedon), A/5th Brigade RA (Weedon)
- Cavalry Brigade (Maldon)
  - 3rd Hussars (Colchester), 4th Hussars (Shorncliffe), Suffolk Yeomanry (Bury St Edmunds), F Battery C Brigade Royal Horse Artillery (Canterbury)
- Corps Artillery (Colchester)
  - E Battery C Brigade RHA (Woolwich), H Battery A Brigade RHA (Woolwich)
  - G/1st Brigade RA (Woolwich), B/5th Brigade RA (Sheffield)
- Corps Engineers (Colchester)
  - A (Pontoons) Troop Royal Engineer Train (Aldershot)
  - C (Telegraph) Troop Royal Engineer Train (Aldershot)
  - 23rd Company Royal Engineers and Field Park (Chatham)

This scheme had been dropped by 1881. The Stanhope Memorandum of 1891 (drawn up by Edward Stanhope when Secretary of State for War) laid down the policy that after providing for garrisons and India, the army should be able to mobilise three army corps for home defence, two of regular troops and one partly of militia, each of three divisions. Only after those commitments, it was hoped, might two army corps be organised for the unlikely eventuality of deployment abroad.

When the Second Anglo-Boer War was imminent in September 1899, a field army, referred to as the Army Corps (sometimes I Army Corps) was mobilised and sent to Cape Town. It was, in fact, 'about the equivalent of the First Army Corps of the existing mobilization scheme', and was placed under the command of Gen Sir Redvers Buller, general officer commanding-in-chief of Aldershot Command. However, once in South Africa the corps never operated as such, and the three divisions (1st, 2nd and 3rd) were widely dispersed.

The 1901 Army Estimates introduced by St John Brodrick allowed for six army corps based on the six regional commands (Aldershot, Southern, Irish, Eastern, Northern and Scottish) of which only I Corps (Aldershot Command) and II Corps (Southern Command on Salisbury Plain) would be entirely formed of regular troops. However, these arrangements remained theoretical, the title 'I Corps' being added to Aldershot Command. In early October 1902 a memorandum was issued showing the organization and allocation of the 1st Army Corps, to which Sir John French had recently been appointed in command:

- 1st Division
  - 1st Brigade (Guards) (Marlborough Lines)
  - 2nd Infantry Brigade (HQ Blackdown)
  - One squadron of cavalry, two brigade divisions Royal Field Artillery, an ammunition column, a field company Royal Engineers, one company Army Service Corps, a field hospital
- 2nd Division
  - 3rd Infantry Brigade (HQ Stanhope Lines)
  - 4th Infantry Brigade (HQ Wellington)
  - One squadron of cavalry, two brigade divisions Royal Field Artillery, an ammunition column, a field company Royal Engineers, one company Army Service Corps, a field hospital
- 3rd Division
  - 5th Infantry Brigade (HQ Bordon)
  - 6th Infantry Brigade (HQ Bordon)
  - One squadron of cavalry, two brigade divisions Royal Field Artillery, an ammunition column, a field company Royal Engineers, one company Army Service Corps, a field hospital
- 1st Cavalry Brigade (South Cavalry Barracks)

In 1907 the title changed to 'Aldershot Corps' but reverted to simply 'Aldershot Command' the following year. Finally, the Haldane Reforms of 1907 established a six-division British Expeditionary Force for deployment overseas, but only Aldershot Command possessed two infantry divisions and a full complement of 'army troops' to form an army corps in the field.

== First World War ==
Pre-war planning for the British Expeditionary Force (BEF) did not envisage any intermediate headquarters between GHQ and the six infantry divisions, but it was assumed that if corps HQs became necessary, then the GOC Aldershot Command would automatically become GOC I Corps in the field. On mobilisation in August 1914 the decision was made to conform to the two-division army corps organisation employed by the French armies alongside which the BEF was to operate. Sir Douglas Haig, then commanding at Aldershot, therefore took I Corps HQ to France with 1st Division and 2nd Division under command, and it remained on the Western Front throughout the war. It had a peripheral part at the Battle of Mons, then saw hard fighting at the Battle of the Aisne and First Battle of Ypres in 1914, at the Battle of Aubers Ridge in the Spring of 1915 and alongside the Canadian Corps at the Battle of Hill 70, as well in many other large battles of the First World War.

=== Composition of I Corps in First World War ===
The composition of army corps changed frequently. Some representative orders of battle for I Corps are given here.

Order of Battle at Mons 23 August 1914

General Officer Commanding: Lieut-Gen Sir Douglas Haig

- Brigadier-General, General Staff (BGGS): J.E. Gough VC
- Brigadier-General, Royal Artillery: H.S. Horne
- Colonel, Royal Engineers: Brig-Gen Spring R. Rice
- 1st Division
- 2nd Division
- Army Troops attached (20 August 1914)
  - 1st Army HQ Signal Company, Royal Engineers
    - D (Air Line) Section
    - G, K & L (Cable) Sections
  - No 2 Section, 1st Printing Company, Royal Engineers
  - No 1 Bridging Train, Royal Engineers
  - B Squadron, North Irish Horse
  - Company, 1st Bn Cameron Highlanders
  - B & C Sections, No 19 Field Ambulance, RAMC

By the time of the battles of Aubers Ridge and Festubert (May 1915), I Corps still had 1st and 2nd Divisions under command, but had been reinforced by 47th (1/2nd London) Division of the Territorial Force, and 1st Canadian Division. Once the era of trench warfare had set in on the Western Front (1915–17), the BEF left its army corps in position for long periods, so that they became familiar with their sector, while rotating divisions as they required rest, training, or transfer to other sectors.

From May 1916 to August 1917, I Corps Cavalry Regiment was provided by the 1st South Irish Horse.

On 25 September 1918, for the final battles, I Corps was transferred from First Army to Sir William Birdwood's Fifth Army.

Order of Battle during the final advance in Artois 2 October-11 November 1918

General Officer Commanding: Lieut-Gen Sir Arthur Holland
BGGS: Brig-Gen G.V. Hordern
Deputy Adjutant & Quartermaster-General: Brig-Gen N.G. Anderson
Commander, Royal Artillery: Brig-Gen H.C. Sheppard
Commander, Heavy Artillery: Brig-Gen F.G. Maunsell
Commander, Engineers: Brig-Gen H.W. Gordon

- 15th (Scottish) Division
- 16th (Irish) Division
- 55th (West Lancashire) Division (transferred to III Corps on 8 October)
- 58th (2/1st London) Division (transferred from VIII Corps/First Army on 14 October).
- Royal Engineers
  - 133rd Army Troops Company
  - 135th Army Troops Company
  - 290th (Staffordshire) Army Troops Company
  - 556th (Glamorgan) Army Troops Company
  - 170th Tunnelling Company
  - 3rd Australian Tunnelling Company
  - 'A' Corps Signal Company
    - 5 and 85 (Motor) Airline Sections
    - K and AN Cable Sections

== Second World War ==
=== Battle of France ===
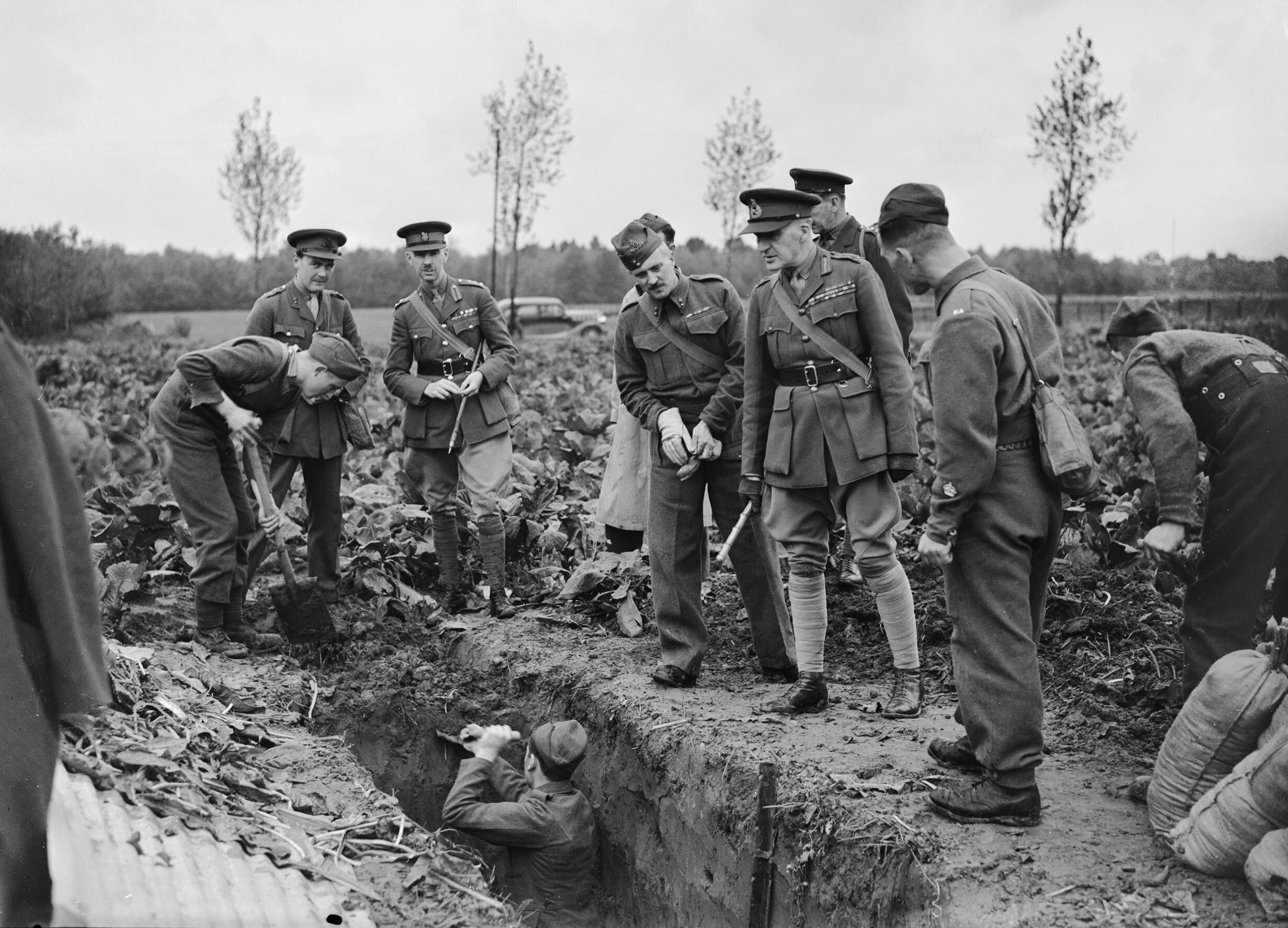
General Sir John Dill, General Officer Commanding I Corps, inspecting soldiers digging trenches at Flines, France. Stood three away from is his Brigadier General Staff (BGS), Brigadier Arthur Percival.

During the Second World War, I Corps' first assignment was again to the British Expeditionary Force (BEF) where it was commanded by General Sir John Dill, and then Lieutenant General Michael Barker from April 1940. After the Germans broke through Allied lines in the Battle of France in May 1940, the BEF was forced to retreat to Dunkirk for evacuation to England. The commander-in-chief (C-in-C) of the BEF, General Lord Gort, ordered Barker to form the rearguard with I Corps to cover the evacuation, and surrender to the Germans as a last resort. However, the acting commander of II Corps, Major General Bernard Montgomery, advised Gort that Barker was in an unfit state to be left in final command, and recommended that Major General Harold Alexander of the 1st Division should be put in charge. Gort did as Montgomery advised, and in the event the bulk of I Corps was successfully evacuated. As Montgomery recalled: '"Alex" got everyone away in his own calm and confident manner'.

=== Composition of I Corps in the Battle of France ===
The order of battle was as follows:
General Officer Commanding: Lieutenant General M.G.H. Barker

- 1st Infantry Division
- 2nd Infantry Division
- 48th (South Midland) Infantry Division
- Royal Artillery
  - 27th Army Field Regiment (21/24 & 37/47 Batteries)
  - 140th (5th London) Army Field Regiment (366 (10th London) & 367 (11th London) Batteries)
  - 3rd Medium Regiment (2/11 & 6/10 Batteries)
  - 5th Medium Regiment (15/17 & 20/21 Batteries)
  - 52nd (East Lancashire) Light Anti-Aircraft Regiment (154, 155 & 156 Batteries)
  - 2nd Light Anti-Aircraft Battery
  - 1st Survey Regiment
- I Corps Troops, Royal Engineers
  - 102nd, 107th, 221st Army Field Companies
  - 105th Corps Field Park Company
  - 13th Corps Field Survey Company
- Infantry—Machine Gun
  - 2nd Battalion, Cheshire Regiment
  - 4th Battalion, Cheshire Regiment
  - 2nd Battalion, Manchester Regiment

=== North-West Europe ===
After returning to Britain, I Corps remained there, based at Hickleton Hall in South Yorkshire within Northern Command, on anti-invasion duties, preparing defences to repel a German invasion of the United Kingdom.

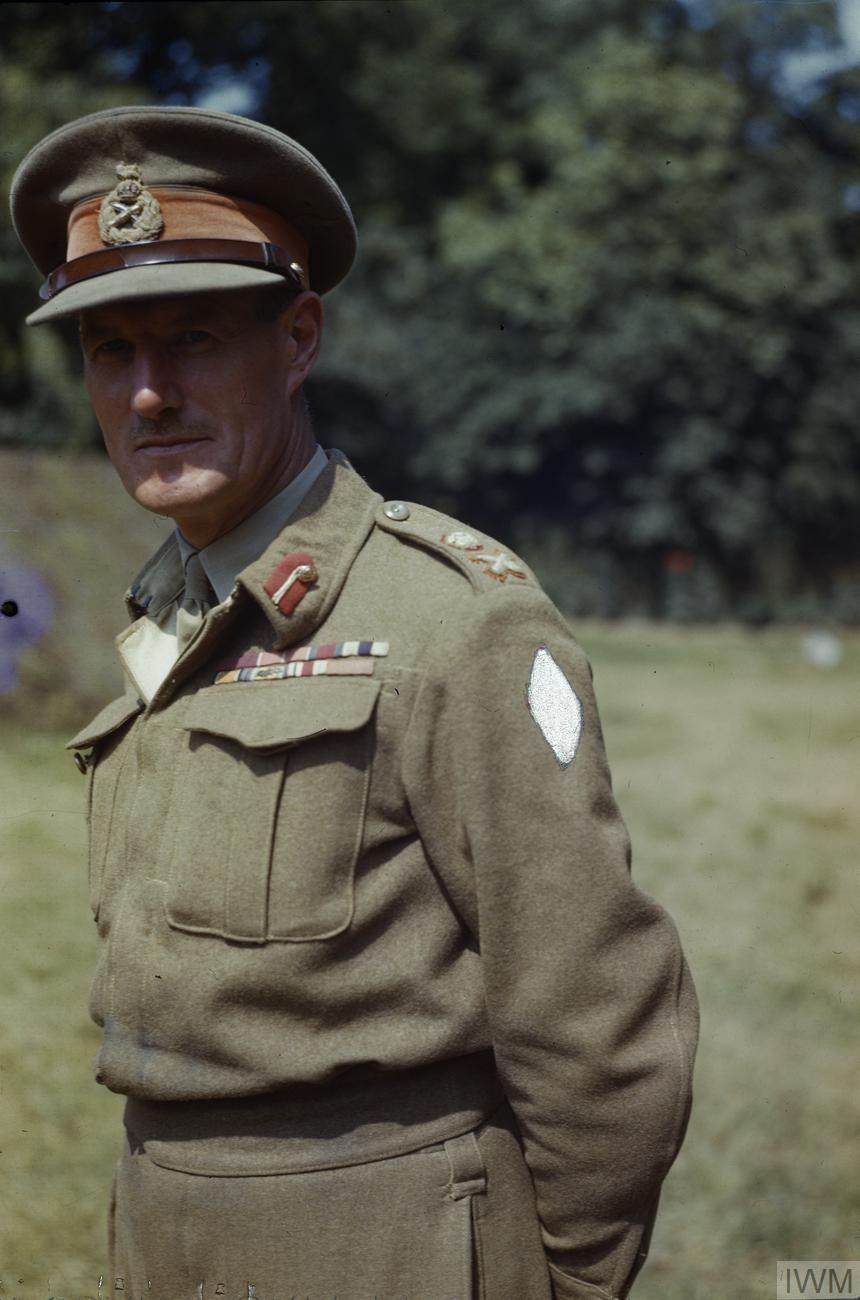
Lieutenant General John Crocker, pictured here in August 1944.

I Corps, now commanded by Lieutenant General John Crocker, then took part in the Normandy landings on 6 June 1944 where, along with XXX Corps, under Lieutenant General Gerard Bucknall (who had commanded I Corps between April and August 1943), it was a spearhead corps of Lieutenant General Miles Dempsey's British Second Army, itself part of the 21st Army Group. The corps was then involved in the Battle of Normandy in fierce attritional fighting for control of the Normandy beachhead.

After fighting for two months in the Battle for Caen, I Corps was subordinated on 1 August 1944 to the Canadian First Army, commanded by Lieutenant General Harry Crerar, for the remainder of the Normandy campaign and the subsequent operations in the Low Countries. I Corps participated in Operation Astonia (the capture of Le Havre) and Clearing the Channel Coast.

I Corps later helped to garrison "The Island" area between Arnhem and Nijmegen in the aftermath of Operation Market Garden.

During Operation Pheasant in North Brabant, I Corps was unique in fielding divisions from several nations: Polish 1st Armoured Division, Canadian 4th Armoured Division, British 49th Polar Bears Division, and US 104th Timberwolf Division.

After the Battle of the Scheldt, I Corps gave up command of any combat forces. Its headquarters administered 21st Army Group's logistics area around the port of Antwerp, Belgium until the end of the war.

=== Composition of I Corps in NW Europe Campaign ===
General Officer Commanding: Lieutenant-general John Crocker

- Corps troops:
  - Inns of Court Regiment, Royal Armoured Corps (armoured cars)
  - 62nd (6th London) Anti-Tank Regiment, Royal Artillery
  - 102nd Light Anti-Aircraft Regiment, Royal Artillery
  - 9th Survey Regiment, RA
  - I Corps Troops, Royal Engineers
  - I Corps Postal Unit, Royal Engineers
  - I Corps Signals, Royal Corps of Signals

Attached:

- 4th Army Group, Royal Artillery
  - 150th (South Nottinghamshire Hussars) Regiment, Royal Horse Artillery (suspended animation January 1945)
  - 53rd (London) Medium Regiment, RA (209 & 210 (London) Batteries)
  - 65th (Highland) Medium Regiment, RA (222 (Fraserburgh) & 223 (Banffshire) Batteries)
  - 68th Medium Regiment, RA (233 & 234 Batteries)
  - 79th (Scottish Horse Yeomanry) Medium Regiment, RA
  - 51st (Lowland) Heavy Regiment, RA

Assignments of corps to armies, and divisions to corps, changed frequently during the campaign:

As of 6 June 1944

- British 3rd Infantry Division
- 3rd Canadian Infantry Division
- 6th Airborne Division

As of 7 July 1944

- British 3rd Infantry Division
- 3rd Canadian Infantry Division
- 51st (Highland) Infantry Division
- 59th (Staffordshire) Infantry Division
- 6th Airborne Division

As of 1 August 1944 (now part of First Canadian Army)

- 51st (Highland) Infantry Division
- 6th Airborne Division (returned to United Kingdom 3 September 1944)
- 49th (West Riding) Infantry Division
- 7th Armoured Division

== British Army of the Rhine ==
After the defeat of Germany, the 21st Army Group became the British Army of the Rhine (BAOR), and 1 Corps, under the command of Lieutenant-general Ivor Thomas, was transformed into a corps district, with an administrative, rather than combat, role. It was disbanded in 1947.

In October 1951 the corps was reactivated to become the principal combat element of the BAOR, with its headquarters in Bielefeld. In March 1952, following the reactivation of 6th Armoured Division, its component formations were:

- 2nd Infantry Division
- 6th Armoured Division
- 7th Armoured Division
- 11th Armoured Division

Included as part of this was Canadian Forces Europe, as Canada's contribution to the NATO land forces in Germany. A Canadian mechanised brigade remained part of BAOR until 1970, until it was moved south. The size of this force, 6,700, was such that it was referred to within British circles as a "light division".

4th Division was reformed from 11th Armoured Division on 1 April 1956.

On 1 July 1960, the 5th Division was redesignated as the 1st Division and the renamed formation took on the 1st Division's lineage and insignia. The division was located at Verden an der Aller, Germany, and formed part of the British Army of the Rhine (BAOR). The formation conducted division-wide trials using the "square brigade" concept. When they were deemed successful in 1970, all brigades within the BAOR were reorganised accordingly. The square brigade was developed in the 1950s. It called for a brigade to contain two armoured regiments and two mechanised infantry battalions. In the late 1960s, new anti-tank and defence in depth concepts were developed as fears of a possible surprise attack by the Warsaw Pact grew. Major-general Edwin Bramall promoted these new ideas when he took command of the 1st Division in January 1972. Bramall felt there was an over-reliance on the arrival of reinforcements to resist an offensive by the Soviet Union rather than the BAOR being able to do so itself. Using the division, the new tactics were refined and were later adopted by the BAOR, and further developed at a higher level in the mid-1970s. The basic concept was to draw Soviet armoured forces into kill zones along their anticipated route of advance. These zones would be mined, and Soviet tanks engaged by anti-tank guided missile-equipped infantry and tanks in hull down positions to inflict heavy casualties. BAOR would conduct a fighting withdrawal as needed using its own reinforcements to counterattack any Soviet breakthroughs. It was expected such methods would allow BAOR to resist an offensive for five days without receiving external reinforcements. Because this strategy required tanks to be used in a more-defensive manner, it ran counter to the then-established doctrine that called for tanks to be used in a more-offensive capacity and in a local counterattack role.

Between 1958 and 1960 the corps was reorganised into three mixed armour/infantry divisions including five brigade groups. In 1965 these brigade groups were brought together into three centralised divisions (1st, 2nd, and 4th). In 1958, the "infantry" designation was dropped from the 2nd Infantry Division's title as part of this reorganisation. During the 1970s, 4th Division consisted of two "square" brigades.

With the end of National Service, manpower across the whole of BAOR dropped from around 77,000 to 55,000.

In the late 1970s the corps was reorganised as four small five-battle-group armoured divisions plus a roughly brigade sized infantry 'Field Force'. It then comprised:

- 1st Armoured Division
- 2nd Armoured Division
- 3rd Armoured Division
- 4th Armoured Division - formed 1978 and served with I (BR) Corps with its headquarters at Hammersmith Barracks in Herford.
- 5th Field Force

In 1981, John Nott, the Secretary of State for Defence for the government elected in 1979, announced the 1981 Defence White Paper. It, like the Mason Review, aimed to balance the British military in line with the nation's financial resources and save manpower. Resultingly, the BAOR was restructured from four armoured divisions of two brigades, into a force of three divisions of three brigades.

Following the 1981-3 reorganisation, the corps consisted of 1st and 4th Armoured Divisions, which would have manned the front line against the anticipated attack by the Soviet 3rd Shock Army, plus in an in-depth, reserve role the 3rd Armoured Division (United Kingdom) and finally the 2nd Infantry Division which was tasked with rear-area security. 3rd Armoured Division then comprised the 4th (based in Münster), the 6th (Soest), and the 33rd Armoured Brigades (Paderborn).

Formations from the early 1980s to the 1990s included:

- 1st Armoured Division (Verden)
  - 7th Armoured Brigade
  - 12th Armoured Brigade
  - 22nd Armoured Brigade
- 3rd Armoured Division (Soest)
  - 4th Armoured Brigade
  - 6th Armoured Brigade
  - 33rd Armoured Brigade
- 4th Armoured Division (Herford)
  - 11th Armoured Brigade
  - 20th Armoured Brigade
  - 19th Infantry Brigade (in UK)
- 2nd Infantry Division (in UK)
  - 15th Infantry Brigade (TA)
  - 24th Airmobile Brigade
  - 49th Infantry Brigade (TA)
- Artillery Division (HQ Ripon Barracks, Bielefeld)

During the 1980s, the 33rd Armoured Brigade joined the 4th Armoured Division and in exchange the 3rd Armoured Division received the 19th Infantry Brigade (Colchester, England). During 1983, the 6th Armoured Brigade converted into the 6th Airmobile Brigade and maintained that role until 1988.

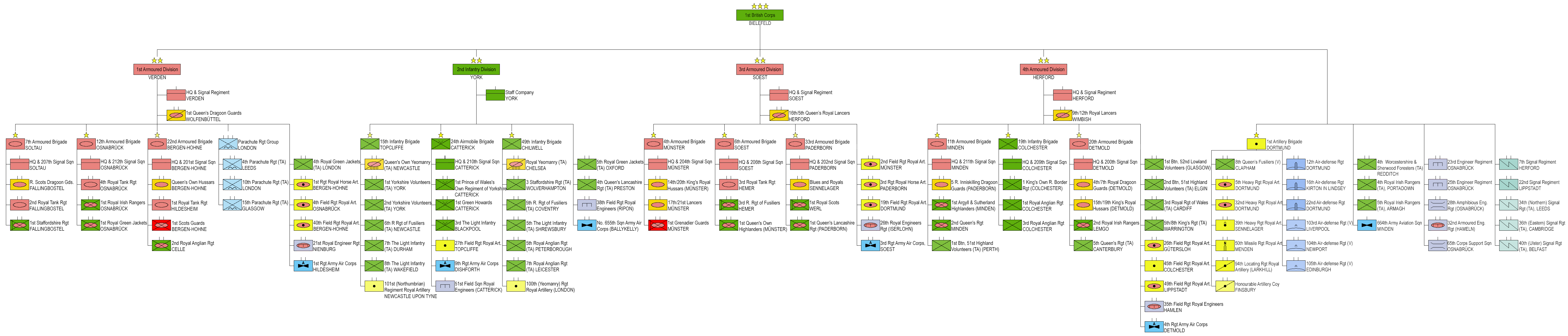
Structure of the 1 British Corps in 1989.

With the end of the Cold War, in 1992 1 (BR) Corps was disbanded, and its HQ closed. Some of the staff serving in HQ 1(BR) Corps were reassigned to the new HQ United Kingdom Support Command (Germany) which was formed from the rump of HQ BAOR. The remainder of the staff formed the British component (50% of the total staff in the HQ) in the Headquarters Allied Command Europe Rapid Reaction Corps (HQ ARRC), a newly instated multi-national NATO Rapid Reaction Corps HQ. The corps commander reported to the Supreme Allied Commander Europe SACEUR, but had no troops under command except when assigned to ARRC by NATO member nations, for operations or for exercises. HQ ARRC moved to Rheindahlen in 1994.

== General Officers Commanding ==
Commanders have included:

- 1815 General The Prince of Orange

From 1901 to 1905 the commander of the troops at Aldershot was also commander 1st Army Corps

- 1 October 1901: General Sir Redvers Buller
- 25 October 1901: Lieutenant-general Sir Henry Hildyard, temporary
- 15 September 1902: Lieutenant-general Sir John French
- 1914 Lieutenant-general Sir Douglas Haig
- 1914–1915 Lieutenant-general Sir Charles Monro
- 1915–1916 Lieutenant-general Sir Hubert Gough
- 1916 Lieutenant General Charles Kavanagh
- 1916 Major-general Havelock Hudson
- 1916 Lieutenant-general Sir Charles Anderson
- 1917 Major-general John Capper
- 1917–1918 Lieutenant-general Arthur Holland
- 1918 Major-general Sir Hugh Jeudwine
- 1918 Lieutenant-general Sir Arthur Holland

Note: I Corps was disbanded at the end of the First World War and reformed at the start of the Second World War

- 1939–1940 General Sir John Dill
- 1940 Lieutenant-general Michael Barker
- 1940 Lieutenant-general Harold Alexander
- 1940–1941 Lieutenant-general Laurence Carr
- 1941–1942 Lieutenant-general Henry Willcox
- 1942–1943 Lieutenant-general Frederick Morgan
- Apr-Aug 1943 Lieutenant-general Gerard Bucknall
- 1943–1945 Lieutenant-general John Crocker
- 1945 Lieutenant-general Sidney Kirkman
- 1945–1947 Lieutenant-general Ivor Thomas

Note: I Corps was disbanded in June 1947 and reformed in late 1951

- 1951–1953 Lieutenant-general Sir Dudley Ward
- 1953–1954 Lieutenant-general Sir James Cassels
- 1954–1956 Lieutenant-general Sir Hugh Stockwell
- 1956–1958 Lieutenant-general Sir Harold Pyman
- 1958–1960 Lieutenant-general Sir Michael West
- 1960–1962 Lieutenant-general Sir Charles Jones
- 1962–1963 Lieutenant-general Sir Kenneth Darling
- 1963–1966 Lieutenant-general Sir Richard Goodwin
- 1966–1968 Lieutenant-general Sir John Mogg
- 1968–1970 Lieutenant-general Sir Mervyn Butler
- 1970–1972 Lieutenant-general Sir John Sharp
- 1972–1974 Lieutenant-general Sir Roland Gibbs
- 1974–1976 Lieutenant-general Sir Jack Harman
- 1976–1978 Lieutenant-general Sir Richard Worsley
- 1978–1980 Lieutenant-general Sir Peter Leng
- 1980–1983 Lieutenant-general Sir Nigel Bagnall
- 1983–1985 Lieutenant-general Sir Martin Farndale
- 1985–1987 Lieutenant-general Sir Brian Kenny
- 1987–1989 Lieutenant-general Sir Peter Inge
- 1989–1991 Lieutenant-general Sir Charles Guthrie
- 1991–1992 Lieutenant-general Sir Jeremy Mackenzie

== External sources ==
- The Long Long Trail
- Official History 1939-40
- Royal Artillery 1939-45
- British Army Locations from 1945
- Regiments.org
- Late 70s-82 order of battle
- 1989 order of battle
