= Henry Stanhope Sloman =

British Army officer

Brigadier-General Henry Stanhope Sloman CMG DSO
- Born: 29 August 1861; Pembroke Dock, Pembrokeshire, Wales
- Died: 29 December 1945; Bournemouth, Dorset, England
- Military career
- Allegiance: United Kingdom
- Branch: British Army
- Service years: 1882–1918
- Rank: Brigadier-General
- Unit: East Surrey Regiment
- Conflicts: Nile Expedition, Mahdist War, Second Boer War, First World War
- Awards: CMG, DSO

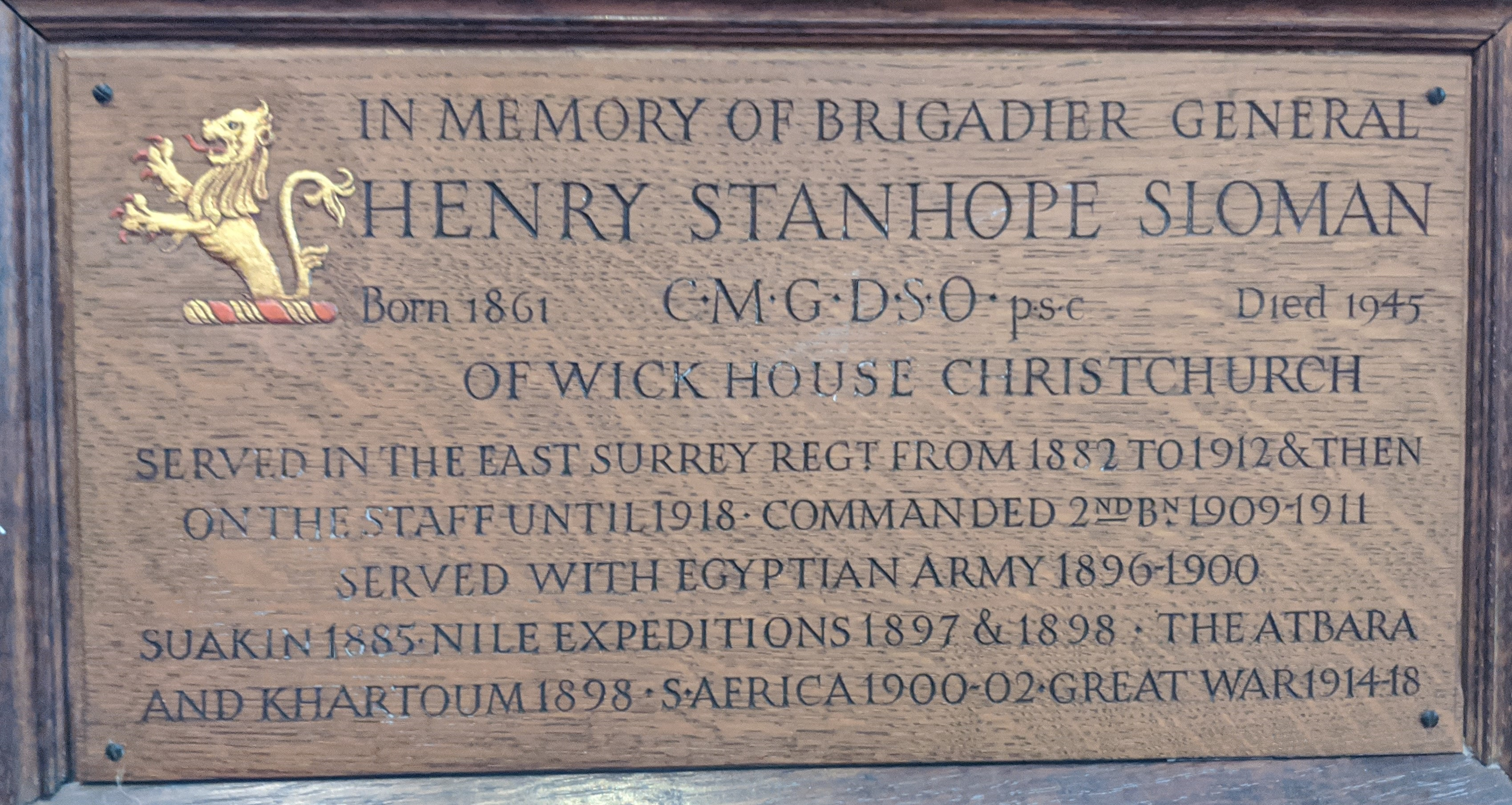
Memorial plaque to Sloman in All Saints Church, Kingston upon Thames, Surrey

Brigadier-General Henry Stanhope Sloman, CMG, DSO (1861–1945) was a senior British Army officer during the First World War.

== Biography ==
Born on 29 August 1861, Henry Stanhope Sloman was educated at Bedford School between 1869 and 1876 and at Sherborne School from 1876 until 1878. He received his first commission as a lieutenant in the East Surrey Regiment on 10 May 1882, served during the Nile Expedition in 1885, and was promoted to captain on 20 November 1888.

Seconded to the Egyptian Army in 1886, he took part in the Anglo-Egyptian conquest of Sudan between 1897 and 1898. He was present at the battles of Atbara (April 1898) and Omdurman (September 1898) and received the Order of the Medjidie, fourth class, and was twice mentioned in despatches.

With the outbreak of the Second Boer War in South Africa in late 1899, he was appointed a Special Service Officer and served as such from 1899 to 1900, and later on the Staff following his promotion to major on 11 December 1901.

The war ended in May 1902, and he left Cape Town in the SS Plassy in August, returning to Southampton the following month. For his service during the war, he was mentioned in despatches, received the Queen's and King's South Africa Medals, and in 1901 was appointed a Companion of the Distinguished Service Order (DSO).

After his return, he was in late November 1902 appointed Deputy Assistant Adjutant-general at Bermuda.

On 3 May 1911 he was appointed as a GSO2 at the War Office in London, taking over from Alfred Knox. On 21 September 1912 he took over as a general staff officer, grade 1 (GSO1), at the War Office, succeeding Colonel Arthur Wigram Money in this role.

He later served during the First World War, between 1914 and 1918. For his services in the war Sloman was invested as a Companion of the Order of St Michael and St George and the Japanese second class of the Order of the Sacred Treasure in 1918.

He retired from the British Army in 1918 and died on 29 December 1945. There is a memorial plaque to Sloman in the East Surrey Regimental chapel, All Saints Church, Kingston upon Thames, Surrey.

He was the son-in-law of Admiral Sir Archibald Lucius Douglas.
