= Graham Bowman-Manifold =

British Army general (1871–1940)

Major-General Sir Graham Bowman-Manifold KBE CB CMG DSO
- Born: 9 June 1871
- Died: 13 March 1940 (aged 68)
- Military career
- Allegiance: United Kingdom
- Branch: British Army
- Service years: 1891–1924
- Rank: Major-General
- Unit: Royal Engineers
- Conflicts: Mahdist War; Second Boer War; First World War
- Awards: Mentioned in Despatches; Order of Osmanieh, 4th Class (Ottoman Empire); Order of the Medjidie, 4th Class (Ottoman Empire); Officer of the Legion of Honour (France)

Major-General Sir Michael Graham Egerton Bowman-Manifold, KBE, CB, CMG, DSO (9 June 1871 – 13 March 1940) was a British Army officer. A Royal Engineer, he held key appointments as signals officer during the Anglo-Egyptian conquest of Sudan, the Second Boer War, and the First World War. He was colonel commandant, Royal Engineers from 1938 until his death.

On 21 September 1912 he became a general staff officer, grade 2 (GSO2), at the War Office in London, taking over this role from Lieutenant Colonel Henry Stanhope Sloman.
