= Saint-Valery-en-Caux =

- Commune
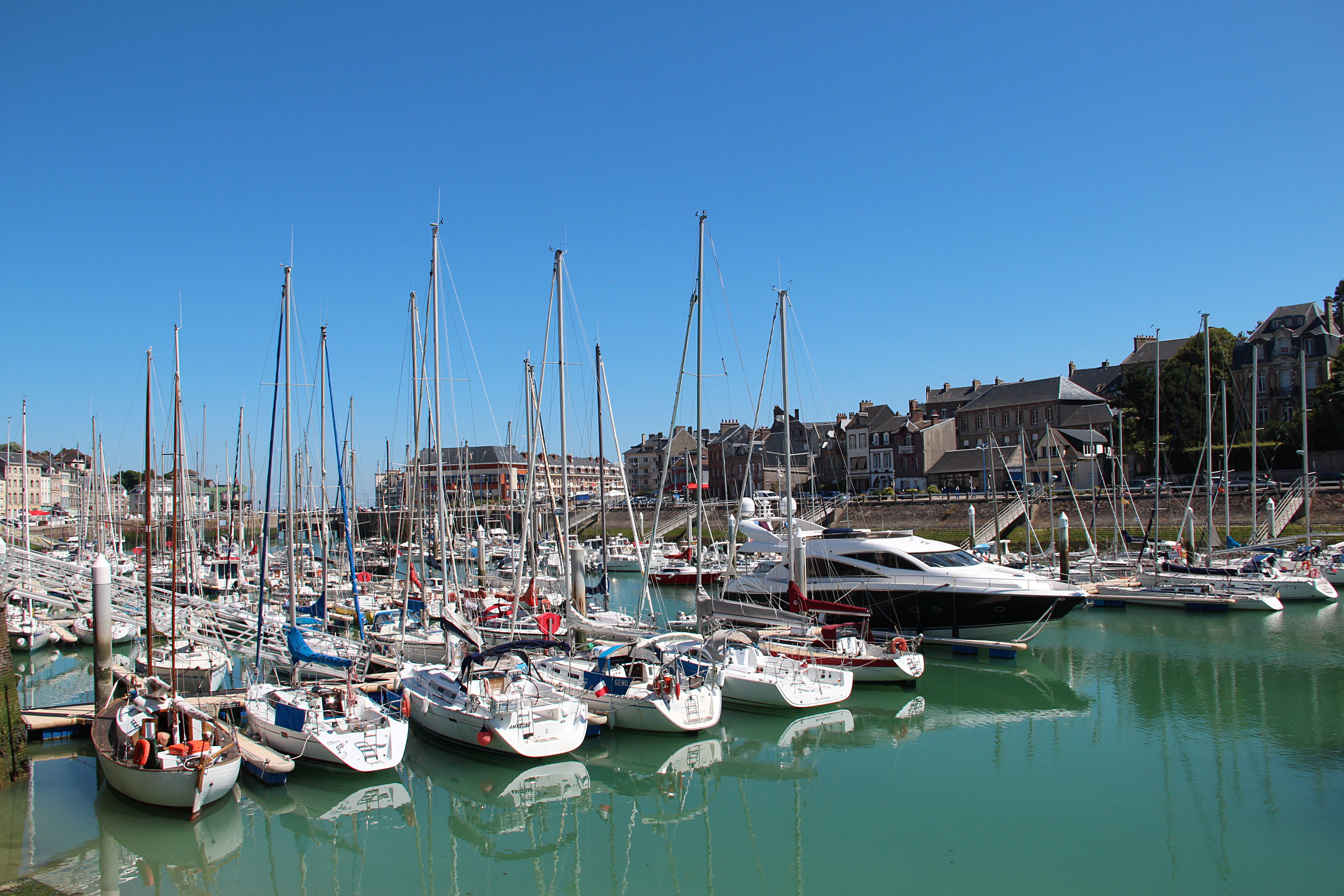
- The marina and town centre

- Coat of arms
- Location of Saint-Valery-en-Caux
- Location within France Location within Normandy
- Coordinates: 49°51′40″N 0°42′36″E
- Country: France
- Region: Normandy
- Department: Seine-Maritime
- Arrondissement: Dieppe
- Canton: Saint-Valery-en-Caux
- Intercommunality: CC Côte d'Albâtre

Government
  - Mayor (2026–32): Bertrand Buirette
- Area^{1}: 10.47 km^{2} (4.04 sq mi)
- Elevation: 5 m (16 ft)
- Highest elevation: 80 m (260 ft)
- Lowest elevation: 0 m (0 ft)
- Population (2023): 3,851
  - Density: 367.8/km^{2} (952.6/sq mi)
- Time zone: UTC+01:00 (CET)
  - Summer (DST): UTC+02:00 (CEST)
- INSEE/Postal code: 76655 /76460
- ^{1} French Land Register data, which excludes lakes, ponds, glaciers > 1 km^{2} (0.386 sq mi or 247 acres) and river estuaries.

Saint-Valery-en-Caux (French pronunciation: [sɛ̃ valʁi ɑ̃ ko], lit. 'Saint-Valery in Caux') is a commune in the Seine-Maritime department in the Normandy region in northern France.

The addition of an acute accent on the "e" (Valéry) is incorrect.

== Geography ==
The town is located 37 miles (60 km) north of Rouen. A small fishing port and light industrial town situated in the Pays de Caux, some 20 miles (32 km) west of Dieppe at the junction of the D53, D20, D79 and the D925 roads. Here, huge chalk cliffs rise up from the pebble beach (sandy at low tide) to overlook the English Channel.

The SNCF station closed in the 1990s and the only public transport is an infrequent bus service.

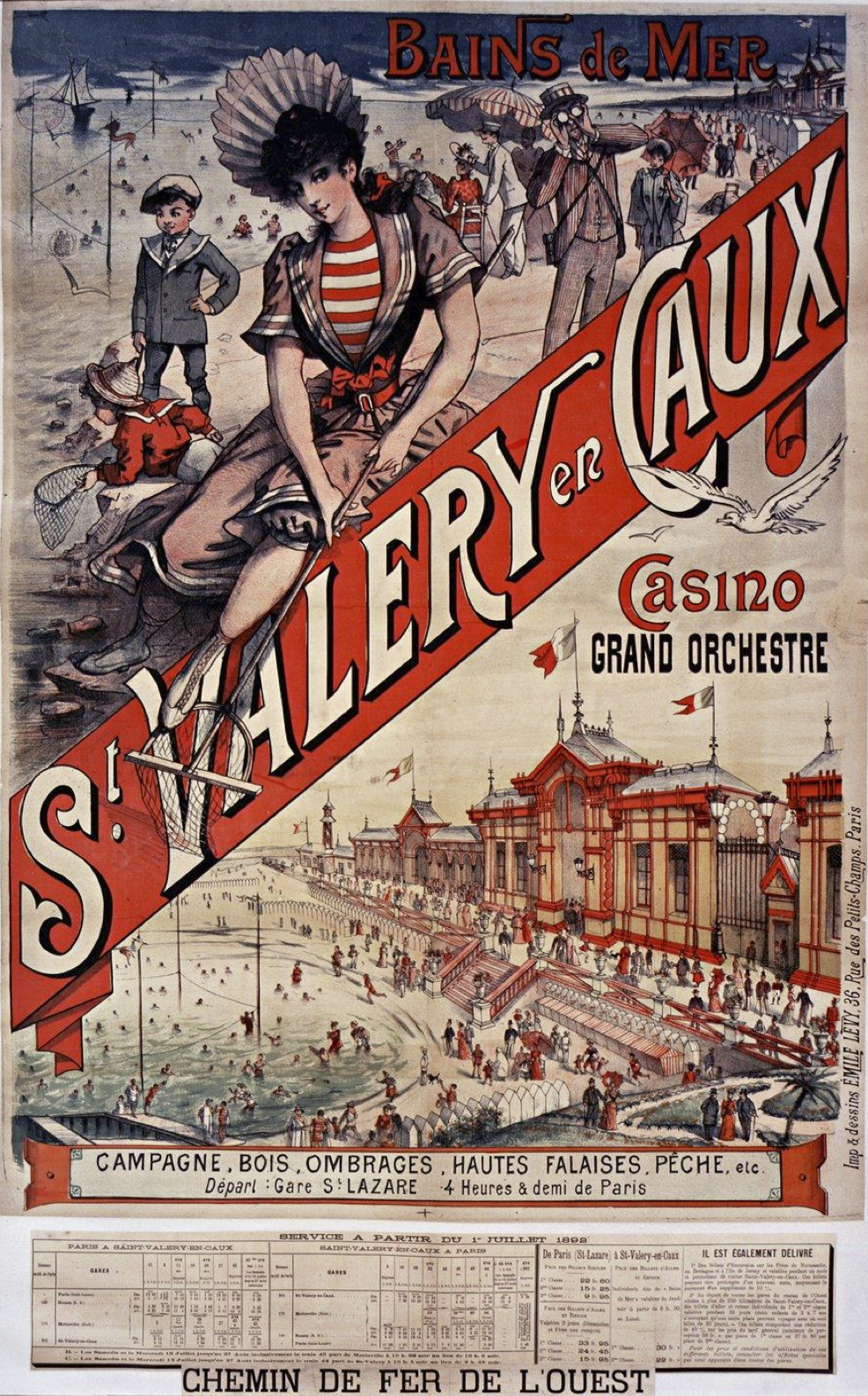
Railway poster promoting bathing in the town (1892)

== History ==
The town is said to have been founded by Saint Valery in the 7th century. A monastery was built on the site of the present-day town and was known as ‘’’Sanctum Walaricum’’’ in 990 CE, according to the charter in which Richard I, Duke of Normandy, gave the town (part of his personal property) to the abbey of Fécamp. The Honour of Saint Valery was a large medieval cross channel landholding.

A busy fishing port from the 13th to the 17th century, its subsequent decline was due to the growth of the much larger port of Fécamp, to the west.

It is perhaps best known as the place where the British 51st (Highland) Infantry Division commanded by Major-General Victor Fortune and French troops surrendered to Major-General Erwin Rommel on 12 June 1940, with the town partly destroyed in the fighting. Saint-Valery-en-Caux was liberated on 11 September 1944 by a re-formed 51st Highland division, among scenes of great local jubilation. On 17 January 1945, the railway station was destroyed when a runaway train full of American troops crashed into it. 89 American soldiers were killed and 152 were injured.

The town has a casino and a waterpark, and has achieved the highest rating of four flowers in the annual France in Bloom competition. Tourism now accounts for much of the town's economy.

=== Heraldry ===
| Arms of Saint-Valery-en-Caux | The arms of Saint-Valery-en-Caux are blazoned : Azure, 2 dolphins addorsed argent. |

== Population ==
Historical population
| Year | Pop. | ±% p.a. |
|---|---|---|
| 1968 | 3,089 | — |
| 1975 | 3,274 | +0.83% |
| 1982 | 5,501 | +7.69% |
| 1990 | 4,595 | −2.22% |
| 1999 | 4,782 | +0.44% |
| 2007 | 4,508 | −0.73% |
| 2012 | 4,314 | −0.88% |
| 2017 | 4,006 | −1.47% |
| 2023 | 3,851 | −0.66% |
Source: INSEE

== Places of interest ==
- The church of St. Valery, dating from the fifteenth century
- A Norman-style half-timber house
- The Commonwealth War Graves Commission cemetery
- A seventeenth-century cloister from the old convent
- The lighthouse
- The memorial to the 51st Highland Division, on the cliff tops
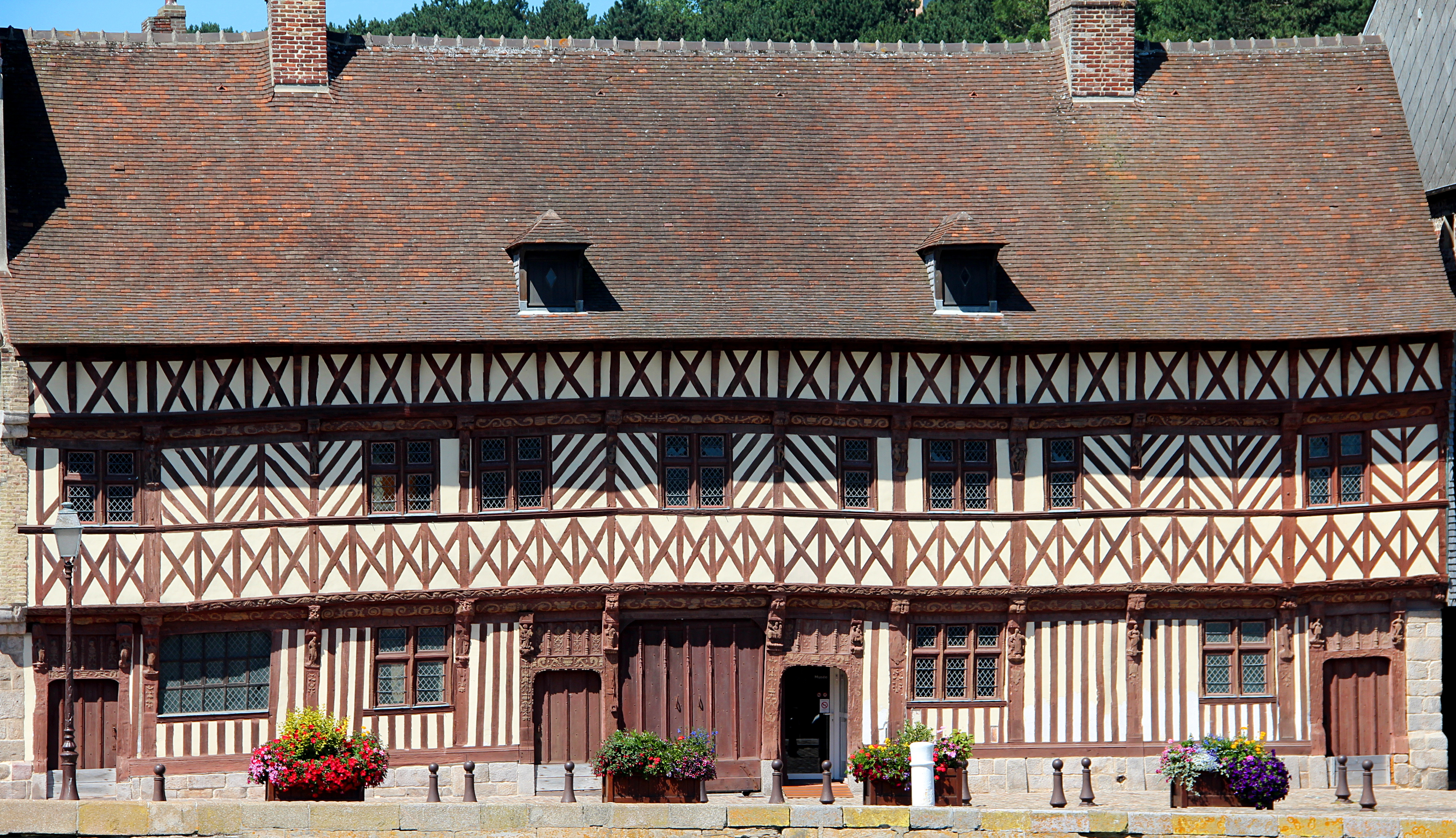
The house called "Henry IV" (16th century)

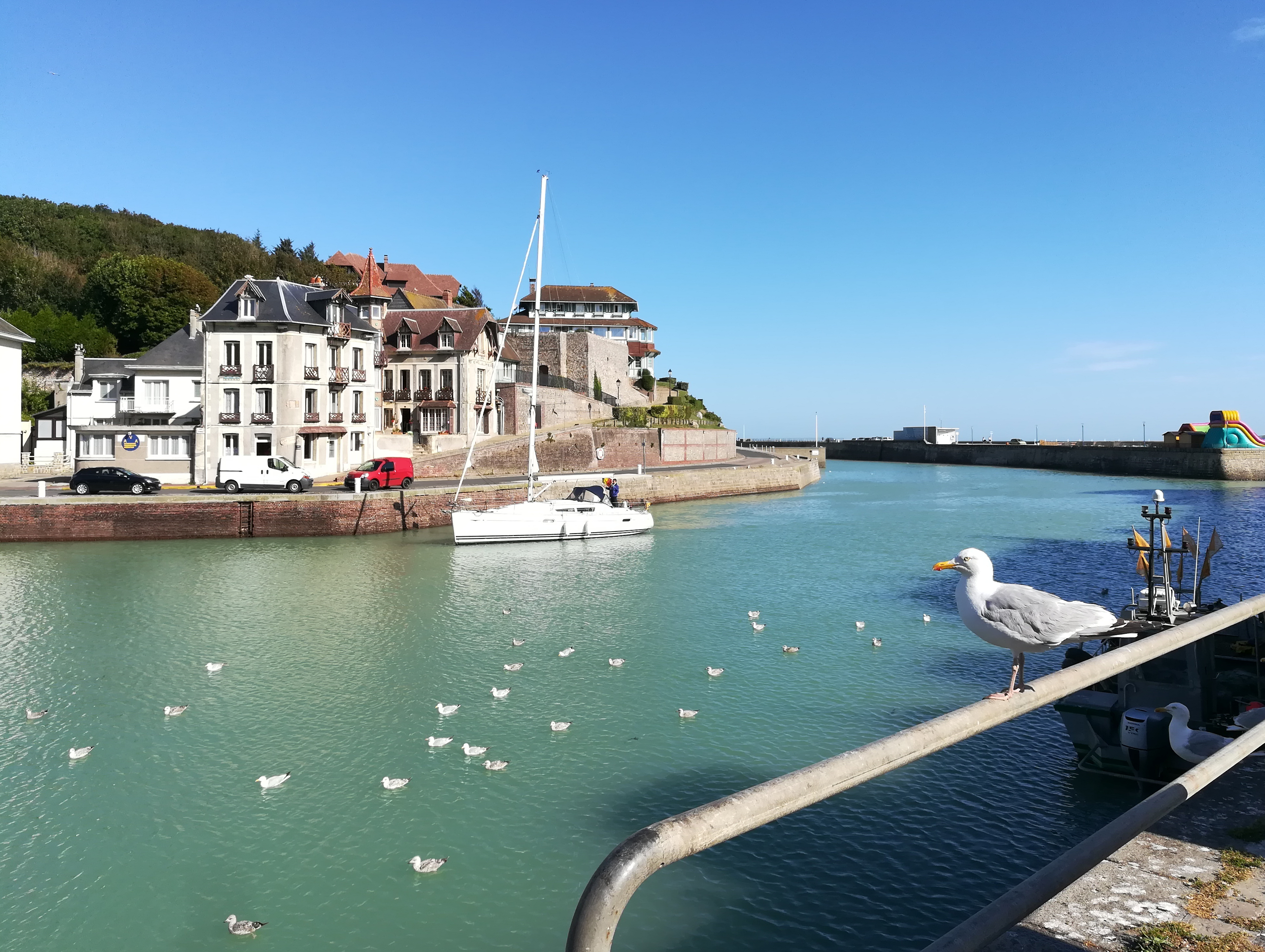
The harbour

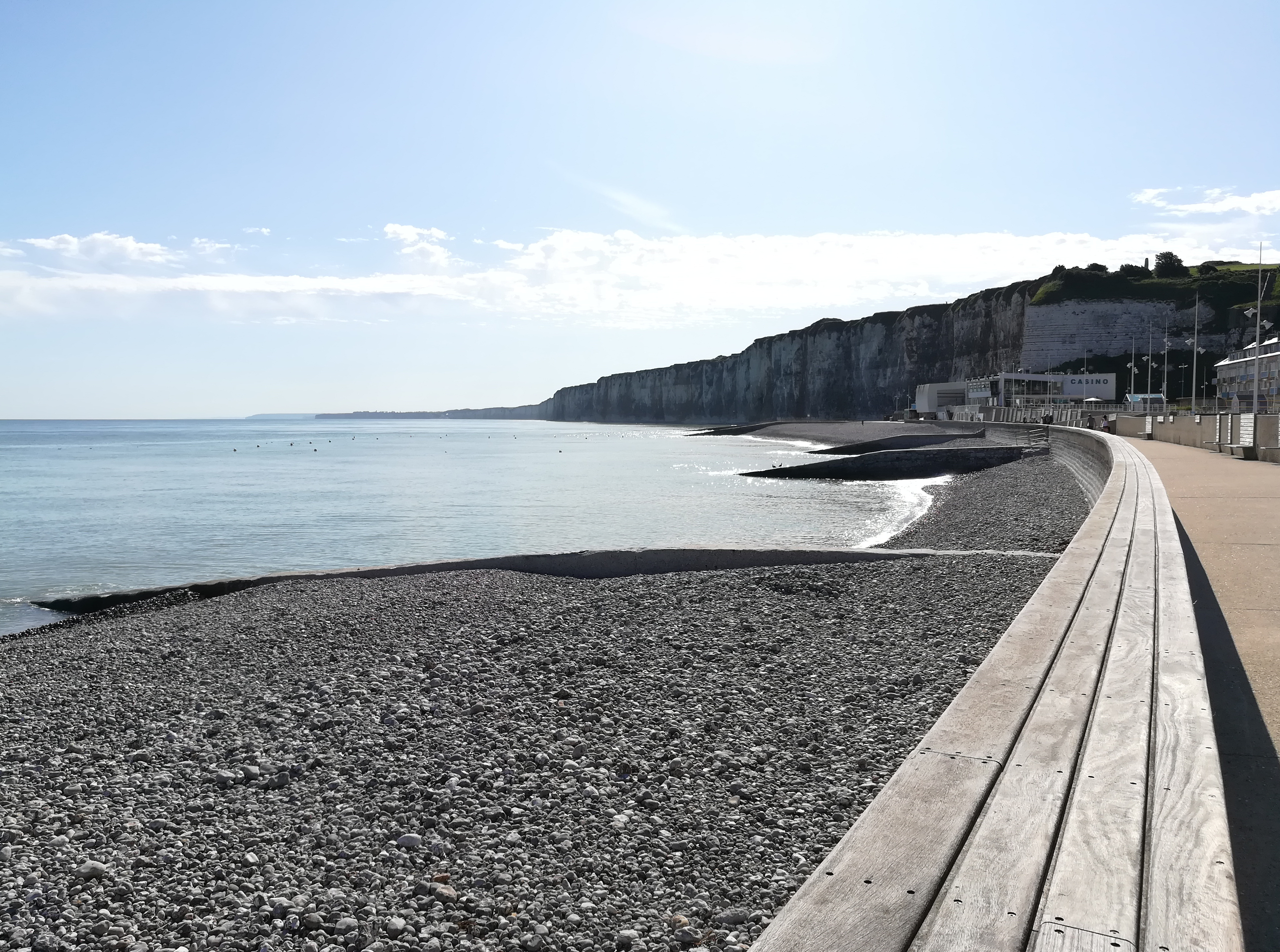
The beach at high tide

== People ==
- French artist Adrien Victor Auger (1787–1854), was born here in October 1787.
- Orientalist Charles Defrémery (1822–1883) died in Saint-Valery-en-Caux.
- Chelsea Football Club footballer Demba Ba grew up here.

== Twin towns ==
- Inverness, Scotland
- Sontheim an der Brenz, Germany

== See also ==
- Communes of the Seine-Maritime department
