= II Corps (United Kingdom) =

- Formation sign of II Corps during the Second World War. It shows a salmon leaping over a "brook", and was designed in 1939 by the corps' chief of staff, Vyvyan Pope, as a play on the name of Alan Brooke, GOC.
- Active: Waterloo Campaign; First World War; Second World War; Post-1945
- Country: United Kingdom
- Branch: British Army
- Type: Field corps
- Engagements: Battle of Waterloo; First World War: Battle of Mons; Battle of Le Cateau; Battle of the Marne; First Battle of the Aisne; Battle of La Bassee; Battle of Messines (1914); Battle of Armentières; Battle of Neuve Chapelle; Battle of the Somme 1916; Battle of the Ancre; German Retreat to the Hindenburg Line 1917; Third Battle of Ypres; The Final Advance in Flanders; Second World War: Retreat to Dunkirk 1940

Commanders
- Notable commanders: Lord Hill; Horace Smith-Dorrien; Claud Jacob; Alan Brooke; Bernard Montgomery (acting); Kenneth Anderson; Gerald Templer

Insignia
- Corps formation sign during the First World War.

The II Corps was an army corps of the British Army formed in both the First World War and the Second World War. There had also been a short-lived II Corps during the Waterloo Campaign.

== Napoleonic precursor ==
Assembling an army in the Southern Netherlands to fight Napoleon's resurgent forces in the spring of 1815, the Duke of Wellington formed it into army corps, deliberately mixing units from the Anglo-Hanoverian, Dutch and German contingents so that the weaker elements would be stiffened by more experienced or reliable troops. As he put it: "It was necessary to organize these troops in brigades, divisions, and corps d’armee with those better disciplined and more accustomed to war". He placed II Corps under the command of Lord Hill. However, Wellington did not use the corps as tactical entities, and continued his accustomed practice of issuing orders directly to divisional and lower commanders. When he drew up his army on the ridge at Waterloo, elements of the various corps were mixed up, and although he gave Hill command of the left wing, this included elements of I Corps. Subsequent to the battle, the corps structure was re-established for the advance into France, and Wellington issued orders through Hill and the other corps commanders.

=== Order of battle ===
GOC: Lieut-Gen Lord Hill

- 2nd (British) Division (Anglo-Hanoverian)
- 4th (British) Division (Anglo-Hanoverian)
- 1st (Netherlands) Division (Dutch)
- Netherlands Indian Contingent

== Before the First World War ==
After the Waterloo campaign the army corps structure disappeared from the British Army for a century, except for ad hoc corps assembled during annual manoeuvres (e.g. Army Manoeuvres of 1913). In 1876 a mobilization scheme for eight army corps was published, with 'Second Corps' based at Aldershot and composed of regular and militia troops. In 1880 its organization was:

- 1st Division (Aldershot)
  - 1st Brigade (Aldershot)
    - 2nd Bn. 19th Foot (Aldershot), 41st Foot (Aldershot), 45th Foot (Aldershot)
  - 2nd Brigade (Aldershot)
    - 75th Foot (Aldershot), 96th Foot (Aldershot), 109th Foot (Aldershot)
  - Divisional Troops
    - 2nd Bn. 18th Foot (Aldershot), Berkshire Yeomanry (Hungerford), 17th Comp. Royal Engineers (Aldershot)
  - Artillery
    - K/3rd Brigade RA (Woolwich), H/4th Brigade RA (Aldershot), M/2nd Brigade RA (Aldershot)
- 2nd Division (Guildford)
  - 1st Brigade (Guildford)
    - 26th Foot (Aldershot), 53rd Foot (Aldershot), 1st Bn. Rifle Brigade (Aldershot)
  - 2nd Brigade (Guildford)
    - 32nd Foot (Jersey), 108th Foot (Portsmouth)
  - Divisional Troops
    - 52nd Foot (Aldershot), Oxfordshire Yeomanry (Woodstock)
  - Artillery
    - L/2nd Brigade RA (Aldershot), E/1st Brigade RA (Aldershot), K/4th Brigade RA (Aldershot)
- 3rd Division (Dorking)
  - 1st Brigade (Dorking)
    - Ayr and Wigtown Militia (Ayr), Renfrew Militia (Paisley), Perth Militia (Perth)
  - 2nd Brigade (Horsham)
    - Galway Militia (Longbrea), North Cork Rifles (Mallow), South Cork Light Infantry (Bandon)
  - Divisional Troops
    - Armagh Militia (Armagh), Middlesex Militia (Uxbridge)
  - Artillery
    - E/5th Brigade RA (Bristol), P/5th Brigade RA (Trowbridge), L/3rd Brigade RA (Woolwich)
- Cavalry Brigade (Lewes)
  - 11th Hussars (Aldershot), 5th Dragoon Guards (Aldershot), 16th Lancers (Brighton), Hampshire Yeomanry (Winchester), A Battery A Brigade RHA (Aldershot)
- Corps Artillery (Artillery)
  - C Battery A Brigade RHA (Aldershot), G Battery C Brigade RHA (Christchurch), D Battery C Brigade RHA (Dorchester)
  - A/1st Brigade RA (Devonport), A/6th Brigade RA (Woolwich)
- Corps Engineers (Aldershot)
  - 15th Company Royal Engineers and Field Park (Kensington)

This scheme had been dropped by 1881. The Stanhope Memorandum of 1891 (drawn up by Edward Stanhope when secretary of state for war) laid down the policy that after providing for garrisons and India, the army should be able to mobilise three army corps for home defence, two of regular troops and one partly of militia, of three divisions each. Only after those commitments, it was hoped, two army corps might be organised for the unlikely eventuality of deployment abroad. The 1901 Army Estimates introduced by St John Brodrick allowed for six army corps based on the six regional commands, of which only I Corps (Aldershot Command) and II Corps (Southern Command on Salisbury Plain) would be entirely formed of regular troops. However, these arrangements remained theoretical. The Haldane Reforms of 1907 established a six-division British Expeditionary Force (BEF) for deployment overseas, which did not envisage any intermediate headquarters between GHQ and the infantry divisions.

== First World War ==
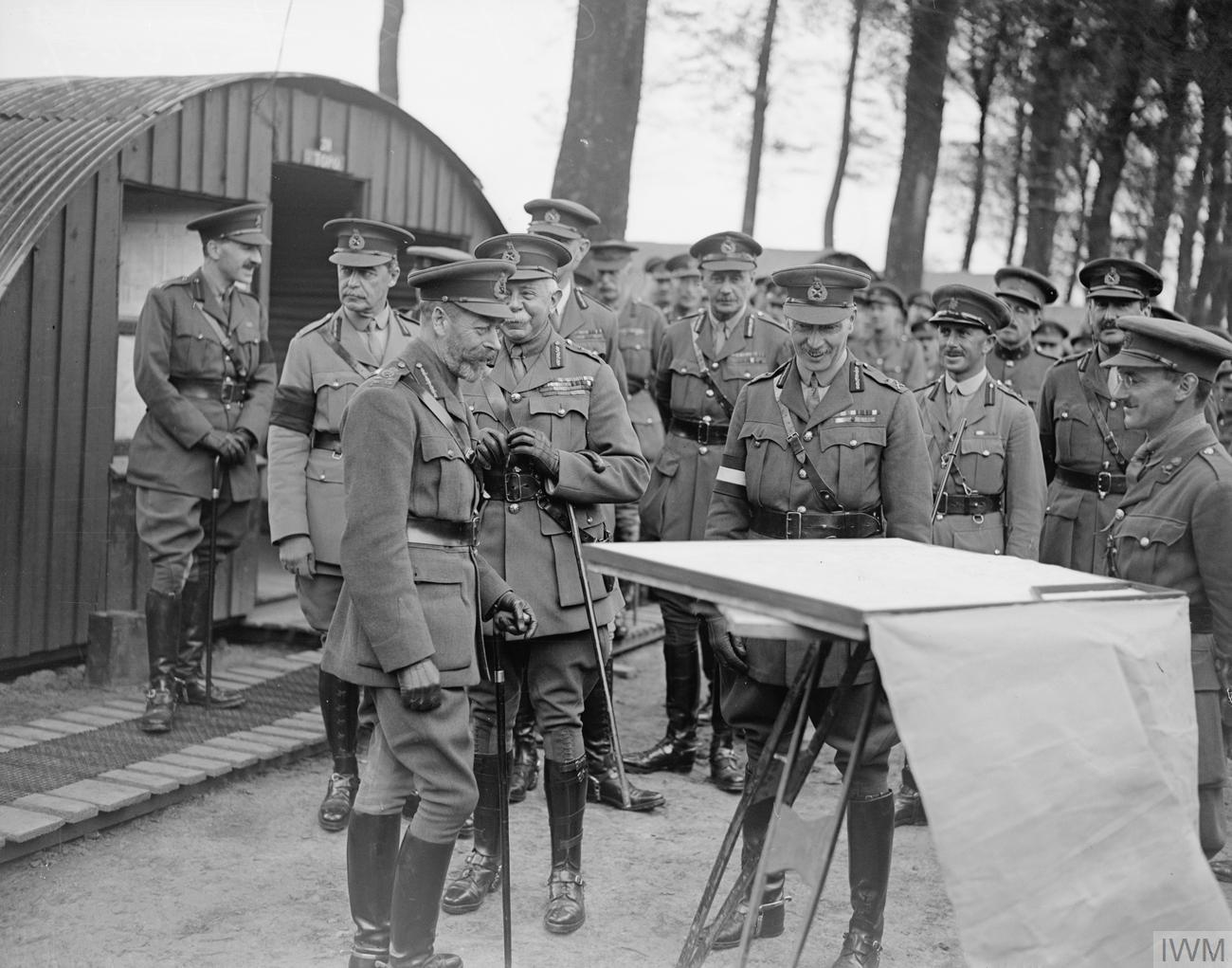
King George V with General Sir Herbert Plumer and other officers of the Second Army and the II Corps in a Nissen hut camp in the Second Army area, 6 August 1918.

On mobilisation in August 1914 it was decided that the BEF would have two-division army corps like the French armies with which the BEF was to operate but only one corps HQ existed, two were improvised. II Corps proceeded to France in August 1914 under the command of Sir James Grierson but Grierson died suddenly on the train to the front on 17 August. Sir John French (GOCinC BEF) wanted Sir Herbert Plumer to succeed Grierson, but the secretary of state for war, Earl Kitchener, instead chose Sir Horace Smith-Dorrien, transferred from Southern Command. Smith-Dorrien caught up with his HQ at Bavai on 21 August. II Corps was first engaged two days later at the Battle of Mons and forced into the Great Retreat with the rest of the BEF. It later fought a delaying action against Alexander von Kluck's German First Army in the Battle of Le Cateau which allowed most of its surviving forces to escape. It remained on the Western Front throughout the war. It was forced into retreat, with the soldiers exhaust

=== Order of battle ===
The composition of army corps changed frequently. Some representative orders of battle for II Corps are given here.

Order of Battle at Mons 23 August 1914:

GOC: Lieut-Gen Sir Horace Smith-Dorrien (Took command 21 August 1914)

- Brigadier-General, General Staff: G. T. Forestier-Walker
- Brigadier-General, Royal Artillery: A. H. Short
- Colonel, Royal Engineers: Brig-Gen E. A. Sandbach
- 3rd Division
- 5th Division
- Army Troops attached (20 August 1914)
  - 2nd Army HQ Signal Company, Royal Engineers
    - E (Air Line) Section
    - M, O & P (Cable) Sections
  - No 2 Bridging Train, Royal Engineers
  - C Squadron, North Irish Horse
  - Company, 1st Bn Cameron Highlanders
  - A Section, No 19 Field Ambulance, RAMC

Order of Battle on the Somme (Battle of Bazentin Ridge 14–17 July 1916)

GOC: Maj-Gen Claud Jacob

- 1st Division
- 23rd Division
- 34th Division

From 12 May 1916 to October 1917, 1/1st Yorkshire Dragoons constituted II Corps Cavalry Regiment. The regiment returned in March 1918 as II Corps Cyclist Battalion.

Order of Battle at the start of the final advance in Flanders (27 September 1918)

GOC: Lieut-Gen Sir Claud Jacob

- 9th (Scottish) Division
- 29th Division
- 36th (Ulster) Division.

== Second World War ==
On the outbreak of the Second World War, II Corps was mobilised at Salisbury with two unprepared infantry divisions, under the command of Lieut-General Sir Alan Brooke from Southern Command. II Corps' insignia, designed by its chief of staff, Vyvyan Pope, was a visual pun on the name of its commander, who was also a keen fisherman: it depicted a red leaping salmon upon three wavy blue bands against a white background, all in an oblong red border. The corps crossed to France to join the British Expeditionary Force (BEF) at the end of September 1939 and at once moved up to the Belgium–France border. It took part in the advance into Belgium to resist the German invasion, and was then pushed back with the rest of the BEF to Dunkirk during the Battle of France. During the retreat, II Corps covered the vulnerable left flank of the BEF. On 29 May 1940, Brooke was ordered back to Britain to form a new force, and he handed over temporary command of II Corps to Maj-Gen Bernard Montgomery of 3rd Division. Under Montgomery, II Corps was evacuated from Dunkirk in June 1940.

=== Order of battle ===
Order of Battle at Dunkirk
GOC: Lieutenant-General Alan Brooke (until 30 May 1940)
Maj-General Bernard Montgomery (acting from 30 May 1940)

- 3rd Infantry Division
- 4th Infantry Division
- 5th Infantry Division (in GHQ Reserve on 10 May)
- 50th (Northumbrian) Infantry Division
- Royal Artillery
  - 60th (North Midland) Army Field Regiment
  - 88th (2nd West Lancashire) Army Field Regiment (attached to 1st Division 28 May)
  - 53rd (London) Medium Regiment,
  - 59th (4th West Lancashire) Medium Regiment
  - 53rd (King's Own Yorkshire Light Infantry) Light Anti-Aircraft Regiment
  - 2nd Survey Regiment
- II Corps Troops, Royal Engineers
  - 222nd, 234th, 240th Army Field Companies
  - 108th Corps Field Park Company
  - 14th Corps Field Survey Company
- 2nd (London) Corps Signals, Royal Corps of Signals
- Infantry—Machine Guns
  - 2nd Battalion, Royal Northumberland Fusiliers
  - 2nd and 1st/7th Battalions, Middlesex Regiment

=== Deception plans ===
After commanding forces in the United Kingdom, from Lower Hare Park near Newmarket within Eastern Command, II Corps was being disbanded in early 1944 when selected to be one of the two corps comprising the notional British Fourth Army, which under the deception plan Fortitude North was supposed to attack Norway.

For this operation II Corps was supposedly headquartered at Stirling in Scotland, and notionally consisted of the genuine 3rd Infantry Division (shortly replaced by the notional 58th Infantry Division), the genuine 55th (West Lancashire) Infantry Division in Northern Ireland, and the genuine 113th Independent Infantry Brigade in Orkney. Under Fortitude North II Corps was supposedly to attack Stavanger, with the 3rd Division (later the 58th) and supporting commandos and paratroops seizing the airfields, the 55th (West Lancashire) Division joining as followup; the genuine U.S. XV Corps from Northern Ireland would augment the force, which would advance on Oslo.

The corps was transferred to First United States Army Group (FUSAG) in early June 1944 and moved to Lincolnshire; restored to Fourth Army when that formation joined FUSAG for Fortitude South II, headquarters now at Tunbridge Wells in Kent, with under command the British 55th and 58th divisions and the British 35th Armoured Brigade. It was notionally transferred to France in late September, consisting of the essentially notional 55th Division, the genuine 79th Armoured Division, and the notional 76th Infantry Division; also apparently at times the genuine 59th (Staffordshire) Infantry Division, disbanded but notionally kept alive. It was notionally part of First Canadian Army in the deception Operation Trolleycar II (threatening an attack on the Germans in the Netherlands) in November 1944.

== Post Second World War ==
After the Second World War, as a genuine corps it was based in the Middle East, controlling British forces around the Suez Canal. Following the British withdrawal from Egypt, II Corps was also the controlling force for the invasion of the country during the Suez Crisis, seemingly controlling 3rd Infantry Division, under Major-General J.B. (Jack) Churcher, and 16th Parachute Brigade as well as 10th Armoured Division and 3 Commando Brigade.

Lieutenant-General Hugh Stockwell commanded the corps during 'Musketeer.' On 31 July 1956 Stockwell, then commanding I Corps in Germany, received a message from the War Office telling him to meet General Sir William Oliver, Vice-Chief of the Imperial General Staff, who flew to Germany to collect Stockwell so that he could be briefed by General Sir Gerald Templer, Chief of the Imperial General Staff, back in London. Briefing Stockwell personally, Templer told him to hand over command of I Corps, but to take sufficient men from the corps staff as he would need to create another headquarters, II Corps, which was to "establish a planning cell in London as quickly as possible." Led by Kenneth Darling as Brigader, General Staff, this group was dispatched to London from West Germany on 4 August to begin setting up the corps headquarters and begin the initial planning. They were installed the next day, Bank Holiday Monday, in the old underground wartime HQ under the Thames, the Montagu House Annex of the War Office. But as the planning continued Stockwell and his new headquarters were not controlling the formations which were to be involved: those in the Middle East and Cyprus were under GHQ Middle East Land Forces, while those in the UK and Germany were directed for these purposes by the War Office through either Home commands or the British Army of the Rhine.

After the invasion had ended and the United Nations Emergency Force was arriving under the Canadian Army general E. L. M. Burns, Stockwell returned to the UK, where II Corps was disbanded by being reintegrated back into I Corps.

== General Officers Commanding ==
Commanders have included:

- 1 October 1901 – 31 December 1904 General Sir Evelyn Wood
- Aug 1914 Lieutenant-General James Grierson
- Aug – Dec 1914 Lieutenant-General Horace Smith-Dorrien
- Jan 1915 – May 1916 Lieutenant-General Charles Fergusson
- Sep 1916 – Sep 1919 Lieutenant-General Claud Jacob
- Sep 1919 - Nov 1919 Lieutenant-General Sir Alexander Godley
- 1939–1940 Lieutenant-General Sir Alan Brooke
- May – Jun 1940 Lieutenant-General Bernard Montgomery
- 1940 – 1941 Lieutenant-General Edmund Osborne
- 1941–1942 Lieutenant-General Kenneth Anderson
- Apr – Sep 1942 Lieutenant-General James Steele
- 1942–1943 Lieutenant-General Gerald Templer
- Jul–Oct 1943 Lieutenant-General Herbert Lumsden
- 1943–1944 Lieutenant-General Sir Desmond Anderson

== External sources ==
- The Long Long Trail
- Official History 1939-40
- Royal Artillery 1939-45
- Regiments.org
- National Archives, II Corps and other files from Operation Musketeer, 1956–58
