= 79th Armoured Division =

- Badge of the 79th Armoured Division
- Active: 14 August 1942–20 August 1945
- Country: United Kingdom
- Branch: British Army
- Type: Specialised armour
- Size: Division
- Engagements: Second World War: Battle of Normandy; Operation Charnwood; Operation Jupiter; Operation Clipper; Operation Plunder; Siegfried Line campaign; Battle of the Scheldt; Battle for the Roer Triangle; Operation Veritable

Commanders
- Notable commanders: Major-General Sir Percy Hobart

The 79th Armoured Division was a specialist armoured division of the British Army created during the Second World War. The division was created as part of the preparations for the Normandy invasion on 6 June 1944, D-Day.

Major-General Percy Hobart commanded the division and was in charge of the development of armoured vehicles that were solutions to problems of the amphibious landing on the defended French coastline; these unusual-looking tanks it developed and operated were known as "Hobart's Funnies". They included tanks that floated, could clear mines, destroy defences, carry and lay bridges, and roadways. The practical use of these specialist tanks was confirmed during the landings on the beaches. Its vehicles were distributed as small units across the divisions taking part in the landings and subsequent operations. The division remained in action during the North-west European Campaign, providing specialised support during assaults to the 21st Army Group and, occasionally, to American units outside 21st. Again they were of significant use during the Rhine crossings.

== History ==
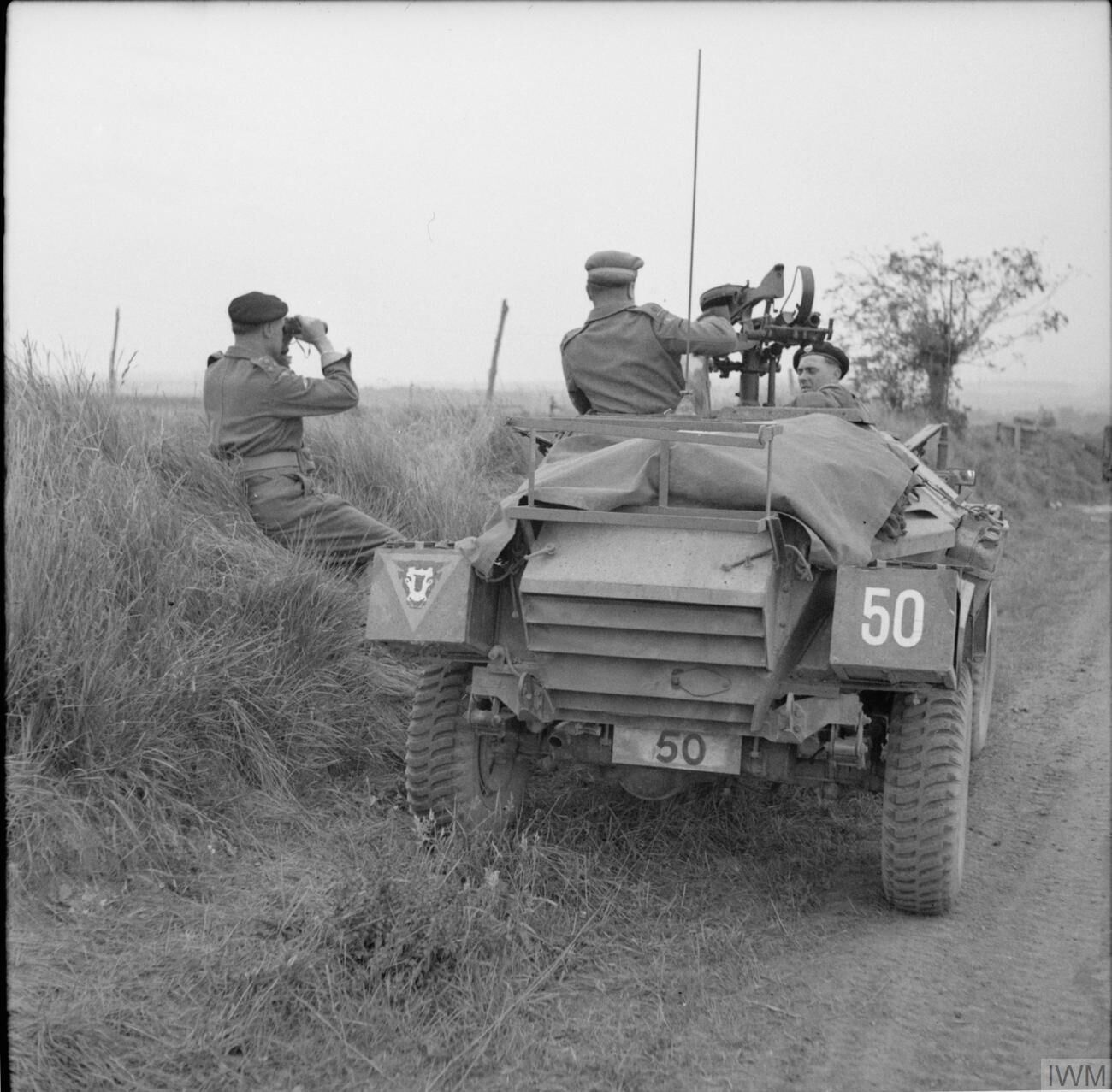
Brigadier N. W. Duncan of the 30th Armoured Brigade watches the attack on Caen from beside his Humber scout car outside Beuville, 8 July 1944.

Hobart had formed the 7th Armoured Division (then known as the Mobile Division) in Egypt before being removed by GOC British Troops in Egypt and went into retirement. He was brought back into the regular army by Churchill in 1941, to train the new 11th Armoured Division; however, ill-health meant he was considered unfit to command the division in battle and he had to give up the appointment. In 1942, Hobart was selected to train another new division.

The 79th was formed as a standard armoured formation serving in the UK under Northern Command in August 1942. General Sir Alan Brooke, the Chief of the Imperial General Staff, who foresaw the need for specialised armoured vehicles, offered command of the division to Major-General Percy Hobart in October 1942.

Initially, the division based on the 27th Armoured Brigade included infantry, artillery and engineers but the infantry unit, 185th, and its artillery regiments were all removed by April 1943. Its engineer units were generally removed by November 1943.

In March 1943, Hobart met Brooke, who gave him the role of developing and training a division of specialist armoured vehicles that would lead the invasion of France in 1944 The initial new organization of the 79th was a tank brigade, an armoured brigade, and a Royal Engineers assault brigade; this was expanded with additional brigades of the new armoured vehicles developed by the 79th.

Hobart gave firm direction and the strange-looking tanks it developed and operated were known as Hobart's Funnies. They included tanks that floated, could clear mines, destroy defences, carry and lay bridges, and roadways - anything that would enable the invasion force to get ashore and break through the German defences. The division landed in France in June 1944. The division was further used during the Battle for Brest, the battle for the Scheldt estuary (Operation Infatuate), the battle for the Roer Triangle (Operation Blackcock), the Rhine crossings (Operation Plunder), the Elbe crossing and (Operation Veritable), the battle for the Reichswald.

The 79th Armoured Division was disbanded on 20 August 1945. Hobart subsequently commanded the Specialized Armour Development Establishment (SADE), which was formed from elements of the 79th together with the Assault Training and Development Centre.

== Equipment ==
The equipment included the following:

- The "Duplex Drive" tank was a Sherman tank converted for amphibious use with twin types of locomotion: tracks and propellers; the design was used by the Allies in the opening phases of the Normandy landings in 1944.
- The Sherman Crab was a mine flail tank designed to clear a safe path through a mine-field by deliberately detonating mines in front of the vehicle; the design was first used during the North African Campaign in 1942.
- The Churchill Armoured Vehicle Royal Engineers (AVRE) was a heavily modified Churchill III or IV armed with a "Petard", a 230mm spigot mortar that fired a 40 pound (18 kg) "Flying dustbin" demolition bomb.
- The 'Bobbin' Carpet Layer was a Churchill AVRE fitted out with a roll of matting for laying on a beach or other soft surface.
- The Fascine Carrier was a Churchill AVRE which could carry and lay large bundles of sticks to repair holes in the ground.
- The Small Box Girder ('SBG') bridge layer was a Churchill AVRE fitted and lay a bridge large enough to cross a 30 foot gap.
- The Churchill Armoured Ramp Carrier ('ARK') was a turretless Churchill tank with ramps at either end which, when lowered, could form a mobile bridge.
- The "Buffalo" Landing Vehicle Tracked ('LVT') was a tracked vehicle intended to carry replenishments from ships ashore; the design was used at the Battle of the Scheldt during the crossing of the Rhine in 1945.
- The Kangaroo armoured personnel carrier was a self-propelled gun or other armoured vehicle, surplus to requirements which was converted by removal of the gun or turret into an infantry carrier. The Kangaroo was not developed until after the D-day landings.
- The Canal Defence Light ('CDL') was a powerful carbon-arc searchlight mounted on a tank which could be deployed to dazzle and confuse enemy troops.
- The Churchill Crocodile was a Churchill VII tank in which the hull machine gun was replaced with a flamethrower; fuel was carried behind the tank in an armoured wheeled trailer.
Equipment used by the 79th Armoured Division
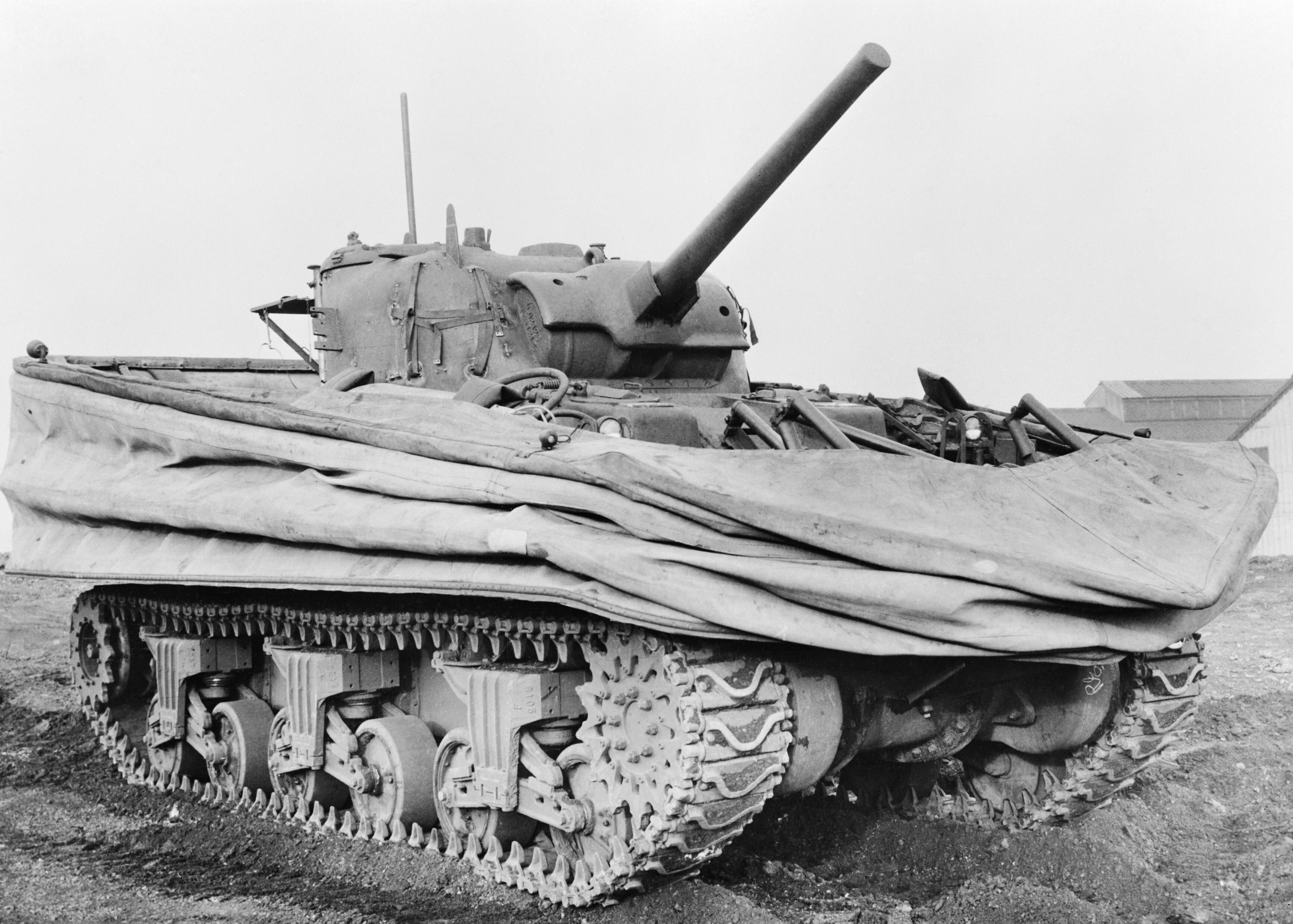
Duplex Drive Sherman tank with its flotation screen lowered

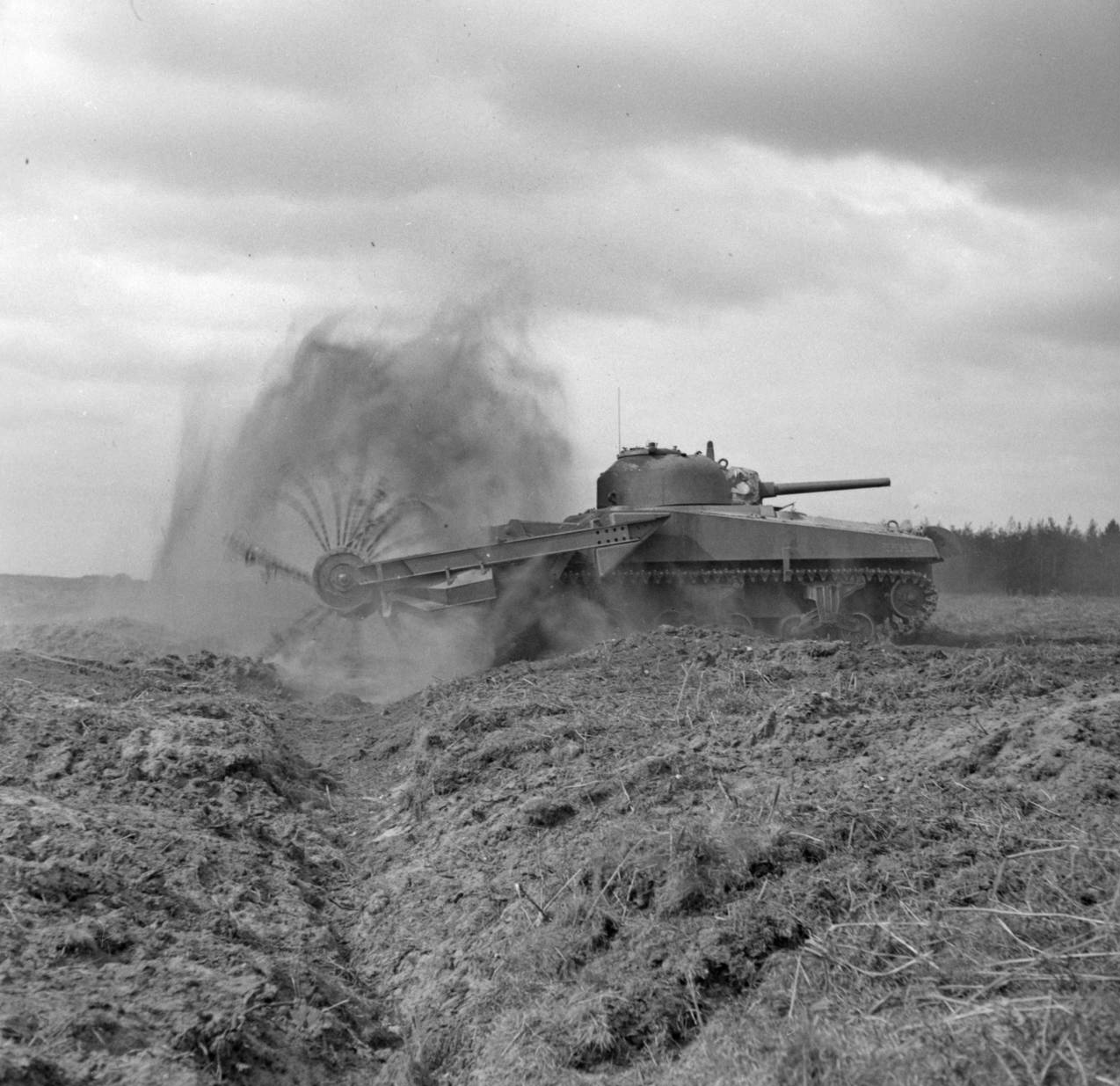
Sherman Crab; flail lowered into a dip; turret traversed rear to avoid flails

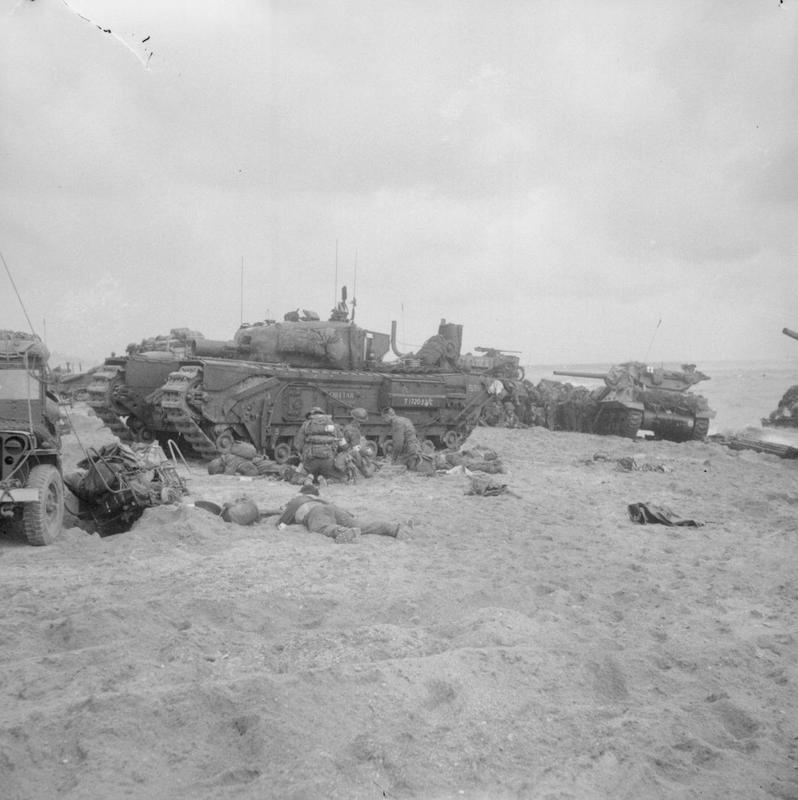
Churchill AVRE from 5th Assault Regiment, Royal Engineers - Sword Beach, 6 June 1944.

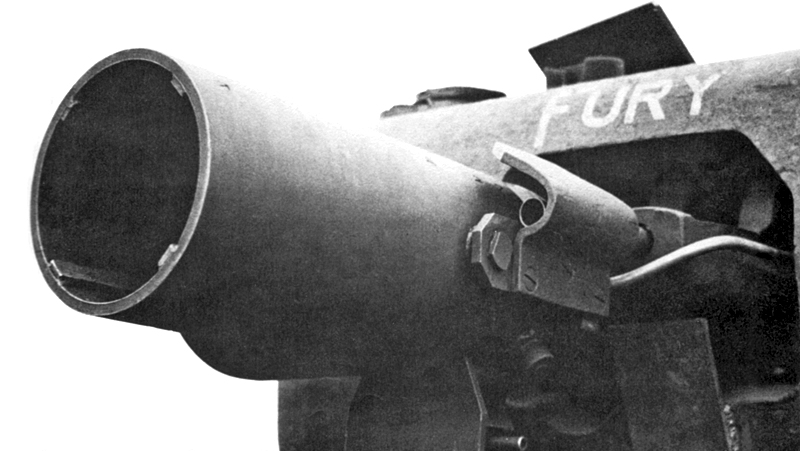
Close-up of an AVRE's Petard Mortar

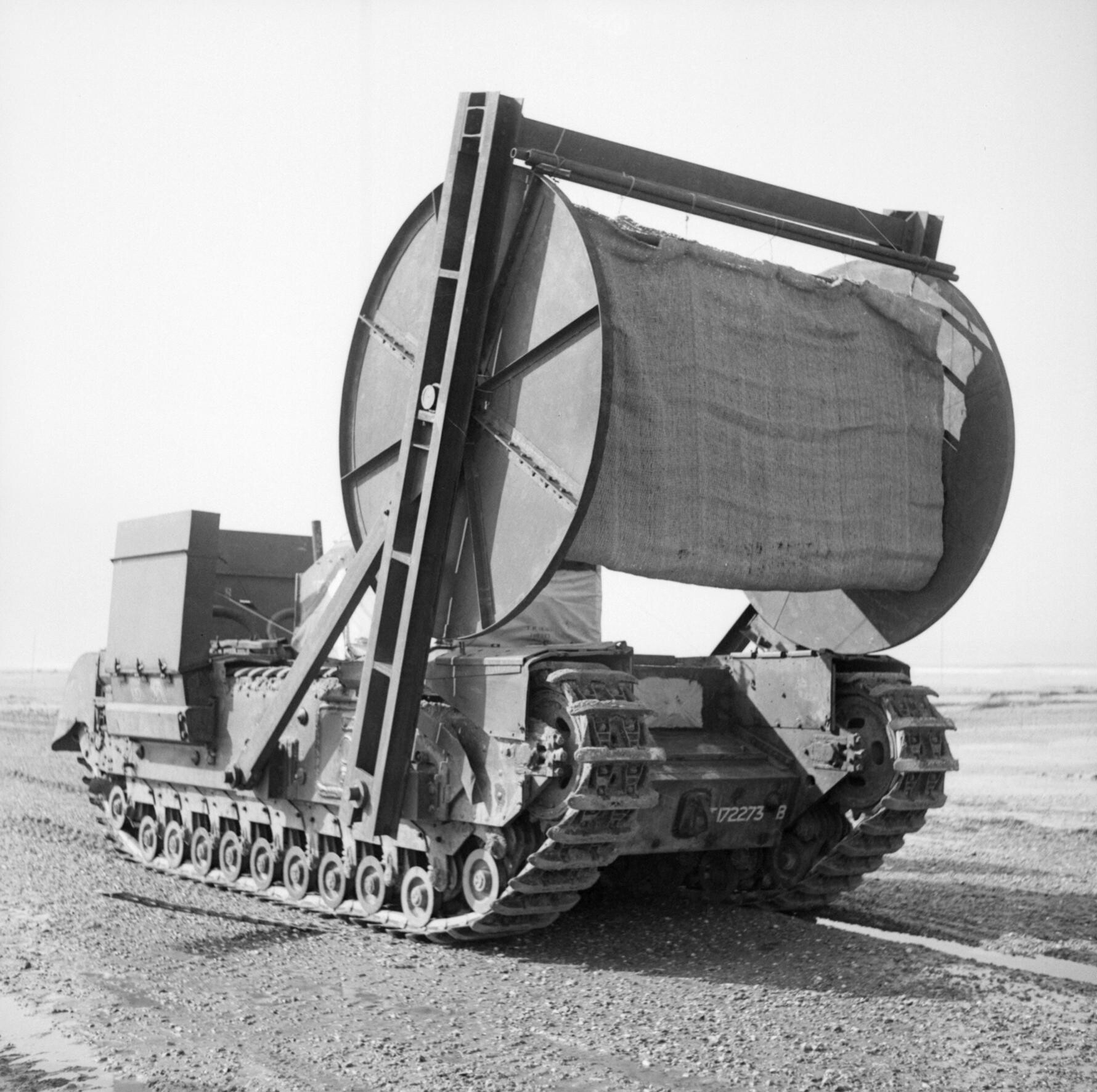
"Carpet roll Type D" - the Churchill is fitted with extended radiator intakes and exhausts so that it could wade ashore

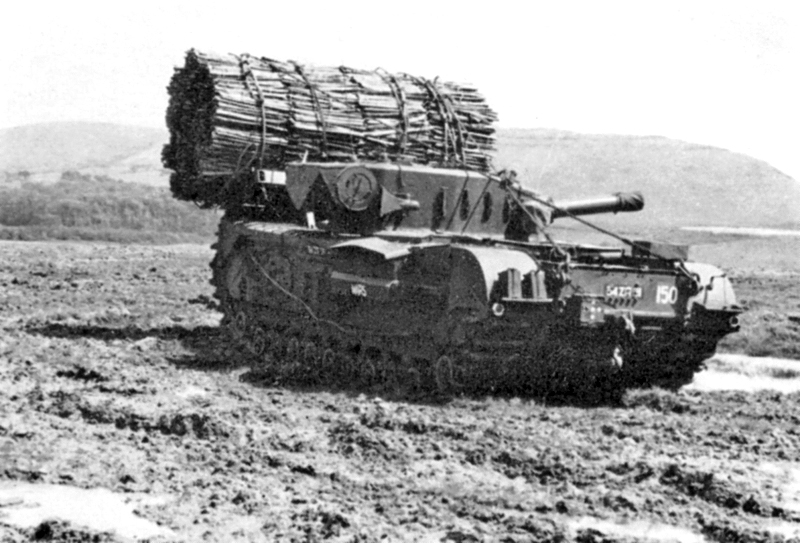
AVRE with Fascine Carrier (a cradle that could tilt forward to deposit fascine)

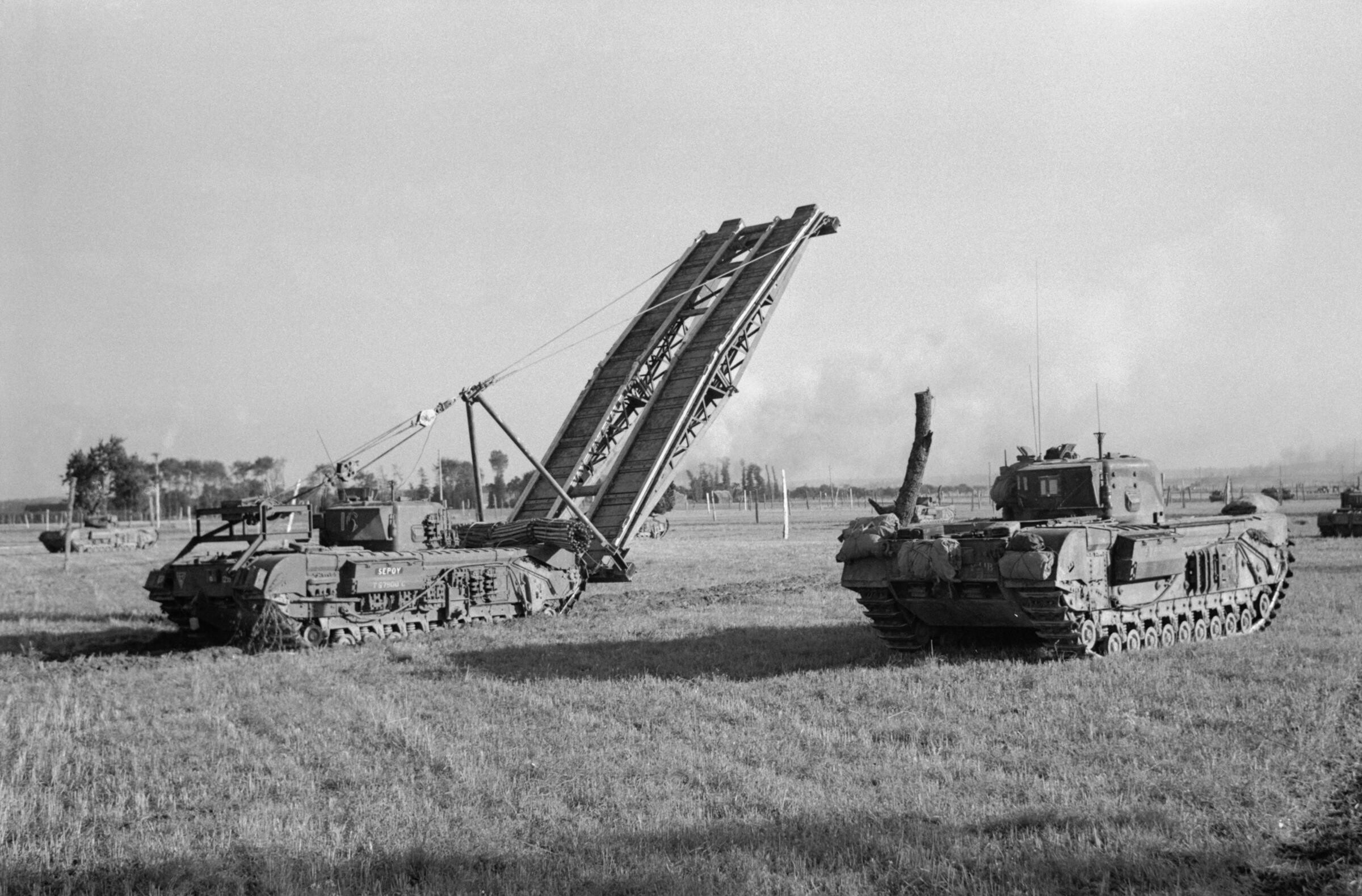
Small Box Girder bridge layer in North-west Europe 1944-45

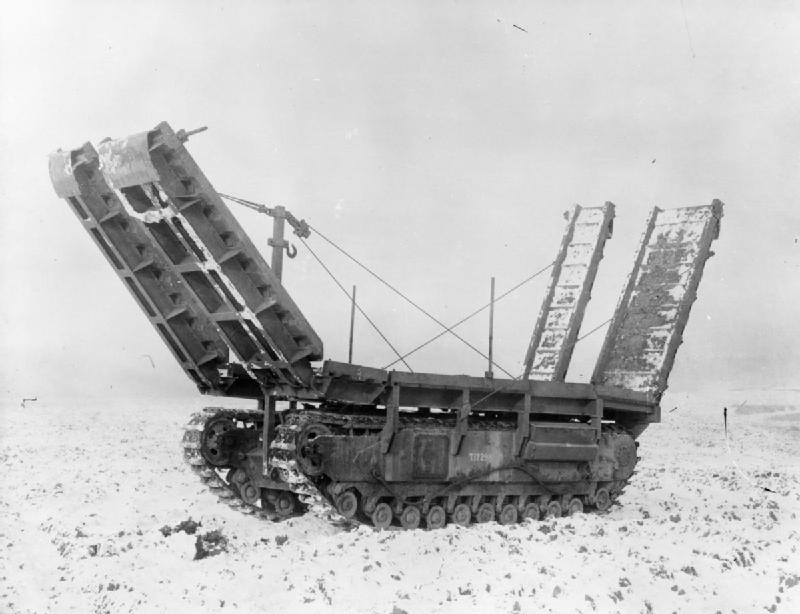
The Armoured Ramp Carrier

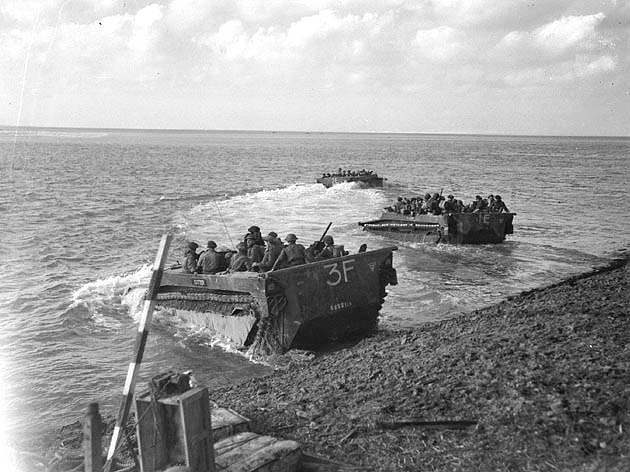
Buffalo amphibious vehicles taking Canadians across the Scheldt 1944

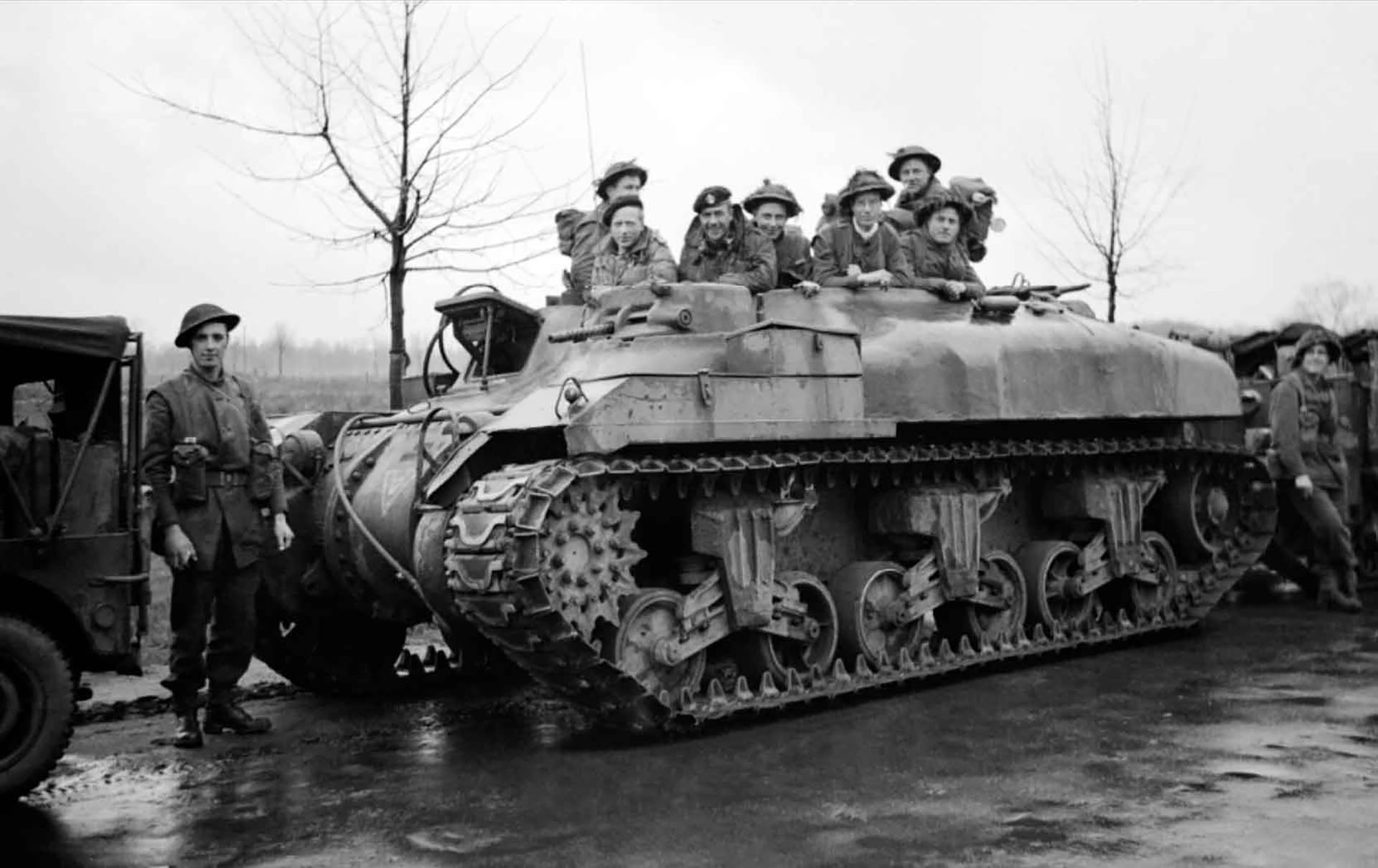
Ram tank converted to Kangaroo personnel carrier being used by infantry of 53rd (Welsh) Division, on the outskirts of Ochtrup, 3 April 1945

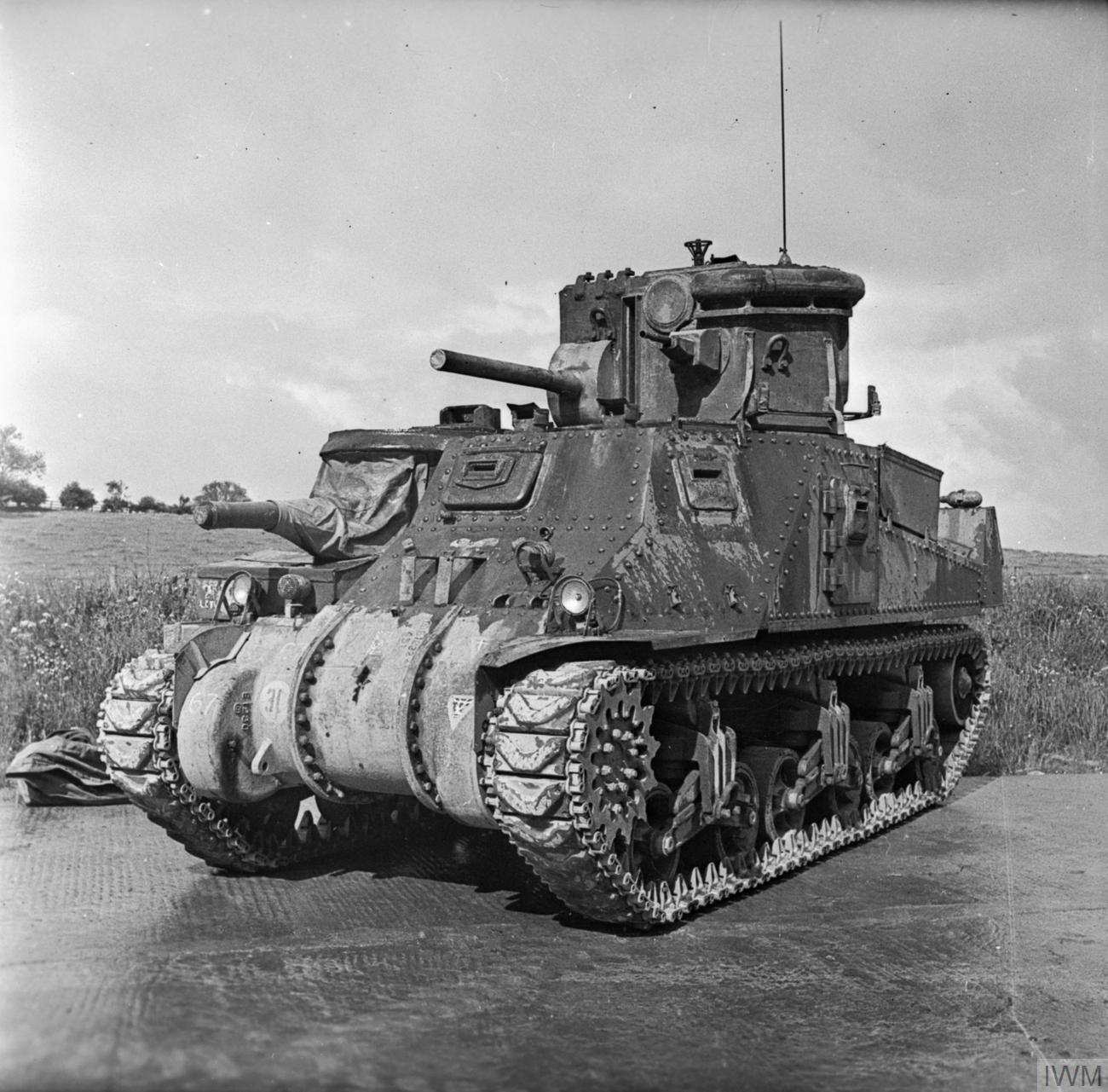
M3 tank fitted with Canal Defense Light in the turret

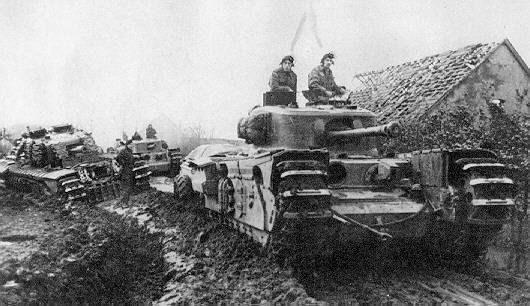
Churchill Crocodile

== Order of battle ==
14 August 1942

The 79th Armoured Division was first raised as a conventional armoured division, with one Armoured Brigade, one Infantry Brigade and supporting arms.

27th Armoured Brigade - Attached to the 79th Armoured Division from 8 September 1942 until 20 October 1943.

- 4th/7th Royal Dragoon Guards
- 13th/18th Royal Hussars (Queen Mary's Own).
- 1st East Riding Yeomanry

185th Infantry Brigade - Transferred out to 3rd Infantry Division on 9 April 1943.

- 2nd Bn Royal Warwickshire Regiment
- 1st Bn Royal Norfolk Regiment
- 2nd Bn King's Shropshire Light Infantry

HQ Royal Artillery – converted into 9th Army Group Royal Artillery on 1 May 1943

- 142nd (Royal Devon Yeomanry) Field Regiment, RA
- 150th (South Notts Hussars Yeomanry) Field Regiment, RA
- 55th (Suffolk & Norfolk Yeomanry) Anti-Tank Regiment, RA
- 119th Light Anti-Aircraft Regiment, RA

1943

30th Armoured Brigade - Transferred to the division on 17 October 1943.

- 22nd Dragoons
- 2nd County of London Yeomanry (Westminster Dragoons)
- 1st Lothians and Border Horse

1st Assault Brigade and Assault Park Squadron RE - Formed on 1 November 1943

- 5th Assault Regiment RE
- 6th Assault Regiment RE
- 42nd Assault Regiment RE

Operation Overlord (Normandy landings)

The division was under direct command of 21st Army Group, portions being placed in support of the Second Army for Operation Overlord.

1st Assault Brigade and Assault Park Squadron RE (AVRE)

- 149 Assault Park Squadron, RE
- 5th Assault Regiment RE
  - 77 Assault Squadron, RE
  - 79 Assault Squadron, RE
  - 80 Assault Squadron, RE
  - 26 Assault Squadron, RE
- 6th Assault Regiment RE
  - 81 Assault Squadron, RE
  - 82 Assault Squadron, RE
  - 87 Assault Squadron, RE
  - 284 Assault Squadron, RE
- 42nd Assault Regiment RE
  - 16 Assault Squadron, RE
  - 617 Assault Squadron, RE
  - 222 Assault Squadron, RE
  - 557 Assault Squadron, RE – remained in England as training unit

30th Armoured Brigade (Sherman Crab)

- 22nd Dragoons
- 2nd County of London Yeomanry (Westminster Dragoons)
- 1st Lothians and Border Horse

Divisional troops

- 79th Armoured Division Postal Unit, Royal Engineers

September 1944

This is the order of battle on 17 September 1944, at the beginning of Operation Market Garden. The division was not involved in that battle, but was involved heavily in the battles for the Channel ports, such as Operation Astonia at Le Havre, and the Battle of the Scheldt.

30th Armoured Brigade (Sherman Crab)

- 22nd Dragoons
- 2nd County of London Yeomanry (Westminster Dragoons)
- 1st Lothians and Border Horse

1st Assault Brigade and Assault Park Squadron RE (AVRE)

- 5th Assault Regiment RE
- 6th Assault Regiment RE
- 42nd Assault Regiment RE

1st Tank Brigade

- 11th Royal Tank Regiment - Grant CDL tank
- 42nd Royal Tank Regiment - Grant CDL tank
- 49th Royal Tank Regiment - Grant CDL tank

31st Tank Brigade

- 141st Regiment Royal Armoured Corps - Churchill Crocodile
- 1st Fife and Forfar Yeomanry - Churchill Crocodile
- 1st Canadian Armoured Carrier Regiment - Kangaroo armoured personnel carrier

Divisional troops

- Staffordshire Yeomanry– Sherman DD tanks
- 79th Armoured Division Postal Unit, Royal Engineers

Operation Varsity (Rhine crossing)

This is the order of battle for the division on 23 March 1945, which was the commencement of the crossing of the River Rhine, and the beginning of the final advance into Germany. As can be seen, the establishment of the division had grown as the requirement for specialised armour had increased.

1st Assault Brigade Royal Engineers (AVRE)

- 5th Assault Regiment R.E.
- 6th Assault Regiment R.E.
- 42nd Assault Regiment R.E.
- 87 Assault Dozer Squadron, R.E.
- 149 Assault Park Squadron, R.E.

30th Armoured Brigade (Sherman Crab)

- 22nd Dragoons
- 2nd County of London Yeomanry (Westminster Dragoons)
- 1st Lothians and Border Horse

31st Armoured Brigade (Churchill Crocodile, Kangaroo (armoured personnel carrier))

- 1st Fife and Forfar Yeomanry (Crocodile)
- 141st Regiment Royal Armoured Corps (Crocodile)
- 7th Royal Tank Regiment (Crocodile)
- 49th Armoured Personnel Carrier Regiment (Kangaroo)
- 1st Canadian Armoured Carrier Regiment (Kangaroo)

33rd Armoured Brigade (LVT 4)

- 1st Northamptonshire Yeomanry
- 1st East Riding Yeomanry
- 4th Royal Tank Regiment
- 11th Royal Tank Regiment

Divisional troops

- Staffordshire Yeomanry– Sherman DD tanks

Divisional troops

- 79th Armoured Division Postal Unit, Royal Engineers

== See also ==
- List of British divisions in World War II
- British Armoured formations of World War II
