= 30th Armoured Brigade (United Kingdom) =

30th (Lowland) Independent Armoured Brigade 30th Armoured Brigade
- Brigade insignia from 1947
- Active: 1940–1945; 1947–1956?
- Country: United Kingdom
- Branch: British Army
- Type: Armoured brigade
- Size: Brigade
- Engagements: Western Front (1944–1945)
- Battle honours: The Rhineland (8 February – 10 March 1945)

Commanders
- Notable commanders: Philip Roberts; Nigel W. Duncan

The 30th Armoured Brigade was an armoured formation of the British Army that served in Western Europe Campaign as part of the 79th Armoured Division. After the reformation of the Territorial Army in 1947, the brigade was re-created within the Territorials based in Scotland and finally disbanded by 1967.

== Second World War ==
=== Service ===
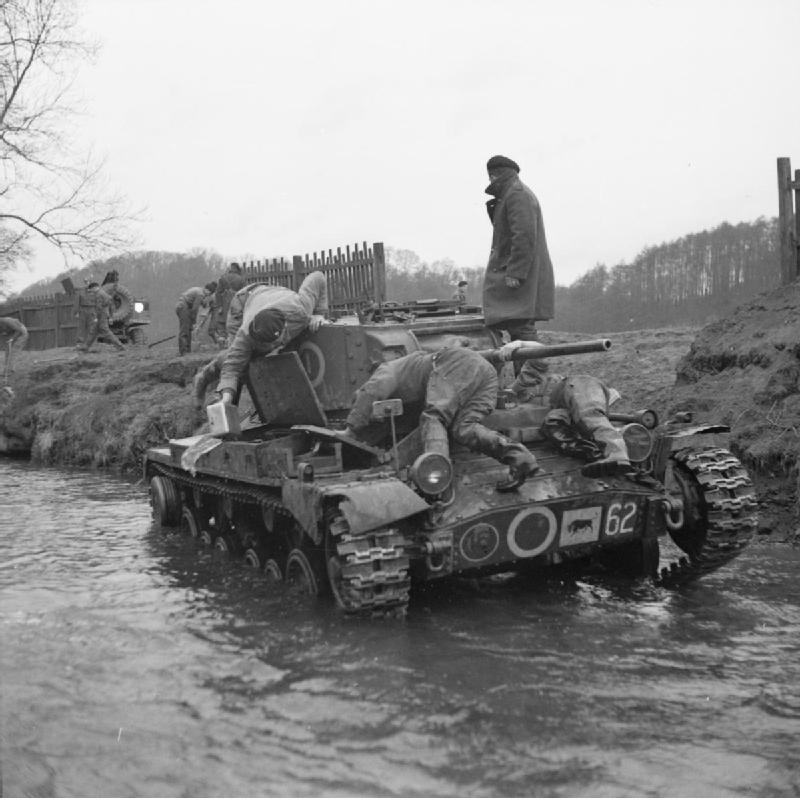
A Valentine tank of the 30th Armoured Brigade which broke down in a stream during exercises near Kirkby Lonsdale in Lancashire, 1 April 1942.

The 30th Armoured Brigade was created on 27 December 1940 as part of Northern Command. It was initially formed from the 2nd Battalion, The Queen's Westminsters, a motorized infantry unit, which was joined by a cavalry unit, the 23rd Hussars, three days later, on 30 December. Just over a week later, on 8 January 1941, the 23rd Hussars were replaced by the 22nd Dragoons, and on 28 January the brigade was transferred to Western Command.

On 8 March the brigade was augmented with the addition of another cavalry unit, the 2nd County of London Yeomanry (Westminster Dragoons), and the following day another armoured regiment, the 1st Lothians and Border Yeomanry was added, and the brigade also became part of the 11th Armoured Division, alongside the 29th Brigade, for training, under the command of Major-General Percy Hobart, and operating the Valentine tank. Soon after, on 22 March, the 2nd Queen's Westminsters were renamed the 12th Battalion, King's Royal Rifle Corps.

On 20 April 1942 the brigade was briefly transferred to the 3rd Armoured Group, and on 13 May it was transferred again to the 42nd Armoured Division. The brigade lost the 12th KRRC on 15 October 1943, and two days later, on 17 October was transferred for the last time, joining the 79th Armoured Division, and finding itself once again under the overall command of Percy Hobart.

A disabled Sherman Crab flail tank of the Westminster Dragoons on Sword Beach, 7 June 1944.

It now consisted of three Armoured units - the 22nd Dragoons, 1st Lothian and Border Yeomanry, and the Westminster Dragoons - that would remain the backbone of the brigade. After a succession of officers, command was assumed by Brigadier Nigel W. Duncan on 6 December 1943. Duncan would command the brigade during its active service from D-Day until after the end of the war in Europe.

By the time of the Normandy landings on 6 June 1944 all three units of the 30th Armoured Brigade were operating the Sherman Crab flail tank, designed to clear paths through minefields and other obstructions. However in common with other 79th Division units they rarely found themselves operating together. On D-Day itself, 'A' Squadron of the 22nd Dragoons, and two troops of 'C' Squadron, landed on Sword Beach with the first wave, while the 22nd's 'B' Squadron landed on Juno Beach, with the remainder of 'C' Squadron, landing there later in the day. The Westminster Dragoons 'B' and 'C' Squadrons landed alongside the 50th Infantry Division on 'Jig' and 'King' sectors of Gold Beach in the first wave, with 'A' Squadron landing later in the day on 'Queen' sector of Sword Beach. The 1st Lothian and Border Yeomanry did not arrive in France until 12 July, but soon found itself in action around Caen.

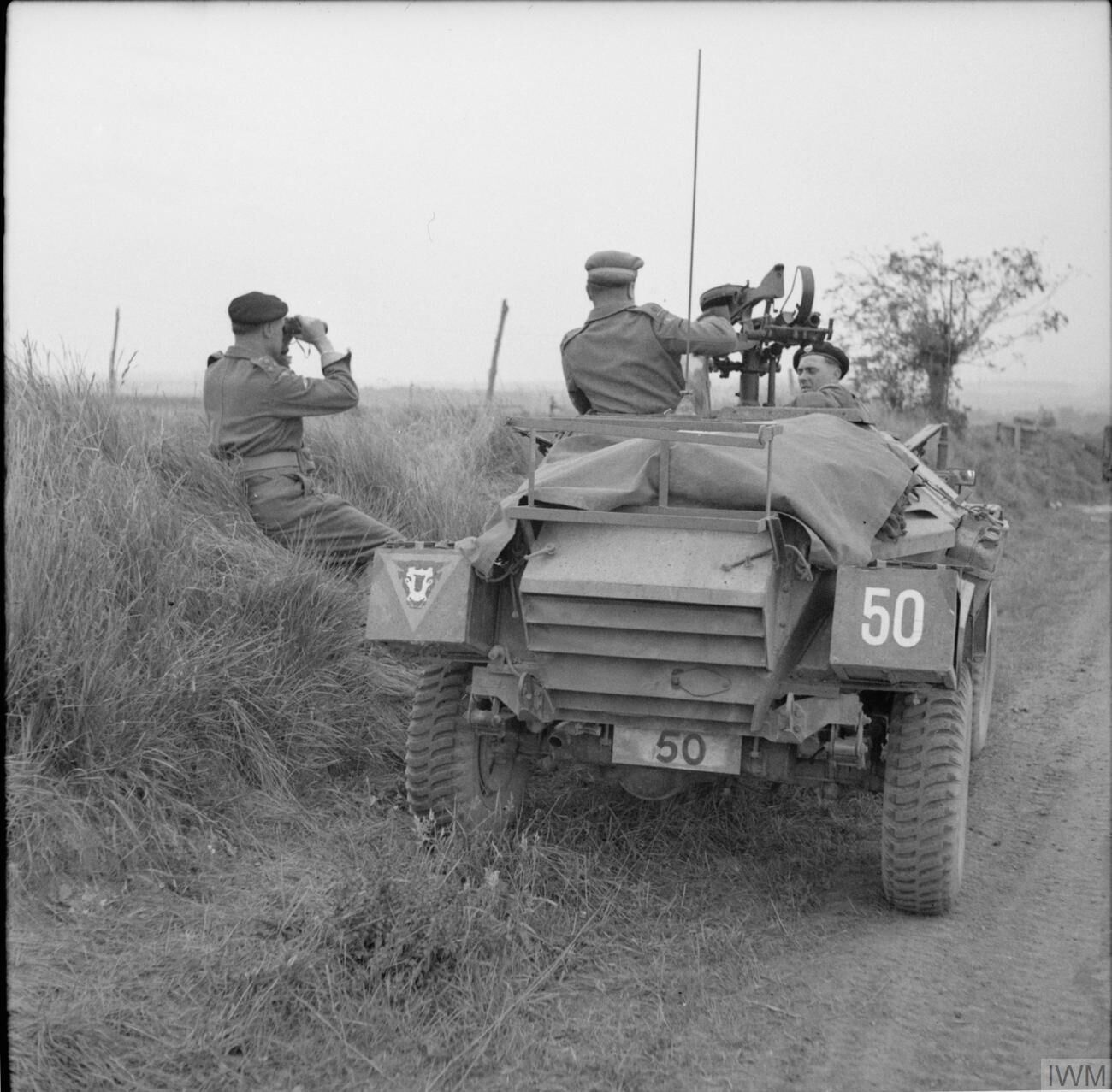
Brigadier N. W. Duncan, commander of the 30th Armoured Brigade, observes the attack on Caen from beside his Humber scout car outside Beuville, 8 July 1944.

30th Brigade continued in action for the rest of the war, taking part in several operations, including the assault on Le Havre in September 1944, the invasion of Walcheren ("Operation Infatuate II") in November 1944, and the crossing of the Rhine in March 1945.

It also had various additional units attached to it temporarily. The 141st Regiment Royal Armoured Corps was part of the brigade from July to September 1944, and the 11th Royal Tank Regiment was added from December 1944 to January 1945. 11th RTR returned with 4th Royal Tank Regiment at the end of March 1945 until the end of April.

Finally, the 22nd Dragoons, the 1st Lothians and Border Yeomanry and the Westminster Dragoons were all transferred from the brigade on 31 August 1945, bringing its existence to an end.

=== Order of battle ===
Units
Unit	From	To
2nd Battalion, The Queen's Westminsters (TA) (renamed 12th Battalion, King's Royal Rifle Corps on 22 March 1941)	27 December 1940	15 October 1943
23rd Hussars	30 December 1940	8 January 1941
22nd Dragoons (formed in 1940)	8 January 1941	31 August 1945
2nd County of London Yeomanry (Westminster Dragoons)	8 March 1941	31 August 1945
1st Lothians and Border Yeomanry	9 March 1941	31 August 1945
141st Regiment Royal Armoured Corps (formerly 7th Battalion, Buffs (Royal East Kent Regiment))	2 July 1944	4 September 1944
11th Royal Tank Regiment	22 December 1944	27 January 1945
4th Royal Tank Regiment	30 March 1945	25 April 1945
11th Royal Tank Regiment	31 March 1945	25 April 1945

=== Commanders ===
Source
Name	From	To	Notes
Brigadier J. H. Anstice	31 December 1940	14 April 1941	Later CO 7th & 8th Armoured Brigades
Lieutenant-Colonel J. G. Crabbe	14 April 1941	13 May 1941	
Brigadier Sir C. F. Keightley	13 May 1941	24 December 1941	Later CO 11th and 6th Armoured Divs., 78th Div., and V Corps.
Brigadier J. J. Kingstone	24 December 1941	4 March 1942	
Brigadier O. L. Prior-Palmer	4 March 1942	26 August 1942	Later CO 29th & 7th Armoured Brigades. MP for Worthing 1945–1964.
Brigadier J. A. Aizlewood	24 August 1942	3 December 1942	Later CO 42nd Armoured Div.
Lieutenant-Colonel J. G. Crabbe	3 December 1942	13 January 1943	
Lieutenant-Colonel G. L. Craig	13 January 1943	16 January 1943	
Brigadier P. G. S. Gregson-Ellis	16 January 1943	20 July 1943	Later CO 1st (Guards) Bde. & 5th Div.
Brigadier G. P. B. Roberts	20 July 1943	6 December 1943	Later CO 11th & 7th Armoured Divs.
Brigadier N. W. Duncan	6 December 1943	20 May 1945	Later Director, Royal Armoured Corps Centre, & Curator, The Tank Museum.
Lieutenant-Colonel C. J. Y. Dallmeyer	20 May 1945	8 July 1945	CO, 1st Lothians and Border Yeomanry.
Brigadier N. W. Duncan	8 July 1945	31 August 1945	

== Post-war in Territorial Army ==
After a short time of disbandment, the brigade was reformed in Scotland as a fully Territorial Army formation, known as the 30th (Lowland) Independent Armoured Brigade. The new formation fell under control of Scottish Command and was headquartered in Glasgow. The brigade's structure in 1947 was as follows:

- Brigade Headquarters, in Lanark?
- 30th (Lowland) Independent Armoured Brigade Signal Squadron, Royal Corps of Signals
- Ayrshire (Earl of Carrick's Own) Yeomanry, in Ayr
- Queen's Own Royal Glasgow Yeomanry, in Glasgow
- Lanarkshire Yeomanry, in Lanark
- Lothians & Border Horse Yeomanry, in Edinburgh
- 30th (Lowland) Independent Armoured Brigade Royal Army Service Corps
- 30th (Lowland) Independent Armoured Brigade Royal Army Ordnance Corps
- 30th (Lowland) Independent Armoured Brigade Field Dressing Station, Royal Army Medical Corps
- 30th (Lowland) Independent Armoured Brigade Provost Unit, Royal Military Police

The brigade's history following its recreation is unknown, however its signal squadron was absorbed into 52nd (Lowland) Signal Regiment in 1950.

According to an Army Order regarding the reorganisation of armoured brigades in 1951, the 30th Armoured Brigade (TA) was to be converted to a flamethrower tank role.

In 1956, the signal squadron tasked with supporting the brigade was disbanded. The three lowland armoured regiments were then amalgamated: Lanarkshire Yeomanry, Queen's Own Royal Glasgow Yeomanry, and Lothians & Border Horse Yeomanry became the Queen's Own Lowland Yeomanry. It is therefore possible that the brigade was disbanded in 1956.

According to Colin Mackie's 'Senior Army Appointments: 1860–present', the brigade was redesignated as the 156th (Lowland) Infantry Brigade in the also reformed 52nd (Lowland) Infantry Division in 1956.

== See also ==
- British Armoured formations of World War II
- List of British brigades of the Second World War
