= East Lancashire Royal Engineers =

3rd Lancashire Royal Engineers (Volunteers) 42nd (East Lancashire) Divisional Engineers 42nd Assault Regiment, RE 123 Field Regiment, RE
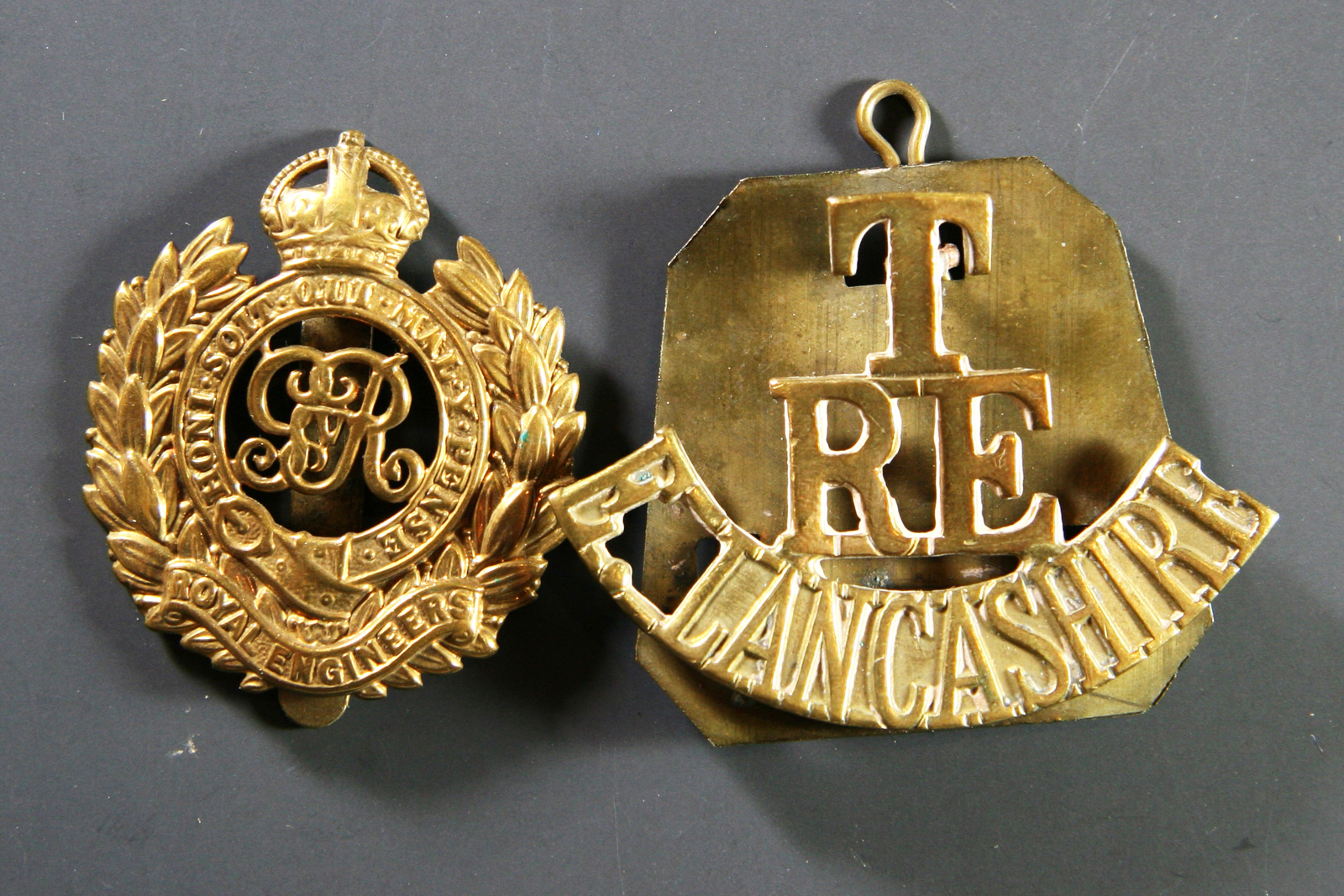
- RE cap badge and TF East Lancs RE shoulder title
- Active: 1901–present
- Country: United Kingdom
- Branch: Territorial Army
- Type: Field Engineer
- Role: Field Engineers; Armoured assault engineers
- Part of: 42nd (East Lancashire) Division; 66th (2nd East Lancashire) Division; 79th Armoured Division; 75 Engineer Regiment
- Garrison/HQ: Manchester
- Engagements: First World War: Egypt; Gallipoli; German spring offensive; Hundred Days Offensive; Second World War: Battle of France; Tunisia; Italy; North West Europe

Commanders
- Notable commanders: Brigadier Gordon Guggisberg

The East Lancashire Royal Engineers (Note: 'East Lancashire Royal Engineers' was the generic title of the unit, covering its numerous changes in official title and its duplicate units during the First World War, and was used for the title of the unit's own published history.) was a Volunteer unit of Britain's Royal Engineers raised in Manchester in 1901. It became the engineer component of the 42nd (East Lancashire) Division of the Territorial Force, seeing service in Egypt, at Gallipoli and (together with a duplicate unit) on the Western Front during the First World War. In the Second World War, it took part in the Dunkirk evacuation with 42nd (East Lancashire) Division, and then converted to the armoured assault engineer role in 79th Armoured Division in North West Europe. Its duplicate unit served in Tunisia and Italy. The unit continues today as part of 75 Engineer Regiment in the Army Reserve.

== Volunteer Force ==
The enthusiasm for the Volunteer movement following an invasion scare in 1859 saw the creation of many Rifle, Artillery and Engineer Volunteer units composed of part-time soldiers eager to supplement the Regular British Army in time of need. One such unit was the 3rd Lancashire Engineer Volunteer Corps (EVC), formed at Manchester in July 1862 and attached to the 19th Lancashire Artillery Volunteers. However, no officers were gazetted to the new unit, which disappeared by October the same year. Another 3rd Lancashire EVC was formed at St Helens on 13 February 1864, but by April the same year it was renumbered 2nd, taking the place of a small unit that had been absorbed by the 1st Lancashire EVC.

As part of the expansion of the Volunteers during the Second Boer War, a new unit with the same number was formed in Manchester as the 3rd Lancashire Royal Engineers (Volunteers). This unit was raised by a committee comprising the leading engineers and engineering employers of the area, including the municipal engineering departments of Manchester and Salford. They had more than 900 applications to join by May 1900, but it was not until November that the War Office sanctioned a unit of eight companies, which received royal approval on 15 February 1901. Major H.T. Crook from the 1st Lancashire RE (V) was promoted to lieutenant-colonel and assumed command of the new unit on 28 February. Enrolment of volunteers did not start until 29 April, and many of the original volunteers had by now joined other units. However, over 400 did enlist by the end of 1901. At first there was no drill hall, and drills were conducted at Albert Street Police Yard; later the unit took over and extended a house at 73 Seymour Grove, Old Trafford. It practised bridgebuilding on the River Irwell in Peel Park, Salford, and carried out its annual training at Whitsun at Ilkley or on the Isle of Man

== Territorial Force ==
When the Volunteers were subsumed into the new Territorial Force (TF) under the Haldane Reforms of 1908, the 3rd Lancashire Engineers became the East Lancashire Divisional Engineers forming part of the TF's East Lancashire Division with the following organisation:

- 1st East Lancashire Field Company (from A, B and C Companies)
- 2nd East Lancashire Field Company (from D, E and F Companies)
- East Lancashire Divisional Telegraph Company (from G Company)
  - No 1 (Cable) Section at Seymour Grove
  - No 2 (Lancashire Fusiliers) Section
  - No 3 (East Lancashire) Section
  - No 4 (Manchester) Section

Nos 2–4 Sections of the Telegraph Company (termed a Signal Company from 1911) were attached to and largely manned by the three infantry brigades of the division. The Signal Company did not train with the rest of the division in 1912, having been specially selected to take part in that year's Autumn Manoeuvres of the Regular Army.

== First World War ==
=== Mobilisation ===
On Sunday 1 August 1914, 2nd E Lancs Field Company had left by train for annual training at Caernarfon and 1st Field Company was entrained and about to depart when orders came cancelling the camp because of the deteriorating international situation. The companies returned to Seymour Grove, where mobilisation orders arrived at 18.00 on 4 August. The men were billeted in the schools next door to the drill hall and horses and carts were requisitioned according to standing instructions. On 10 August units of the Territorial Force were invited to volunteer for Overseas Service, which was greeted with acclamation at Seymour Grove; virtually the whole of the East Lancashire Division volunteered. On 18 August the HQ and field companies left Old Trafford for a training camp at Doffcocker, near Bolton, while the signal company went to Bury and its sections camped with their brigades.

On 31 August, the formation of a reserve or 2nd Line unit was authorised for each 1st Line unit where 60 per cent or more of the men had volunteered for Overseas Service. The titles of these 2nd Line units would be the same as the original, but distinguished by a '2/' prefix. In this way duplicate battalions, brigades and divisions were created, mirroring those TF formations being sent overseas. Later 3rd Line units were formed to supply drafts to the 1st and 2nd Lines. The divisional Commanding Royal Engineer (CRE) since 12 March 1913 had been Colonel Charles Edward Newton of Timperley Park, a civil engineer, but he was replaced on 31 August 1914 by Lt-Col S.L. promoted from command of 1st E Lancs Fd Co. Newton continued as CRE of the 2nd Line.

=== 42nd (East Lancashire) Divisional Engineers ===
42nd (East Lancashire) Divisional insignia, First World War

The East Lancashire Division was selected as the first complete TF division to go overseas, to relieve Regular troops from garrison duties in Egypt. The divisional engineers entrained at Bolton on 9 September and the following day embarked at Southampton with a strength of 19 officers and 568 other ranks (ORs). 1/1st Field Company embarked on the Neuralia and Deseado. the 1/2nd on Aragon, the Signal Company on the Saturnia, and the horses aboard the Messaba.

==== Egypt ====
The convoy of troopships arrived at Alexandria on 25 September, and from mid-October the divisional engineers were working on the Suez Canal defences. 1/1st Fd Co built a floating bridge across the canal using Red Sea fishing boats, the Signal Co set up communications for the Cairo defences and trained infantry signallers. Early in 1915 the signal establishment was increased to provide a section for the divisional artillery HQ. The companies were withdrawn for training after Christmas, but returned to the canal defences when the Turkish Army carried out a Raid on the Suez Canal. Nos 1 and 2 Sections of 1/1st Fd Co and signal detachments were engaged in the fighting at Tussum on 3–4 February 1915, the Sappers holding the west bank of the canal and suffering their first casualties.

==== Gallipoli ====
On 1 May the division began embarking at Alexandria to join the Gallipoli Campaign: the CRE and 1/2nd Fd Co on the Toronto, 1/1st Fd Co on the Nessian, and the Signal Co with Divisional HQ aboard the Crispin. 2nd Signal Section landed with the Lancashire Fusilier Brigade at Cape Helles on 5–6 May and went straight into action at the Second Battle of Krithia; the rest of the engineers landed between 9 and 12 May. The division was designated 42nd (East Lancashire) Division from 26 May.

Over the following weeks the sappers carried out a great deal of digging as the campaign degenerated into Trench warfare. They also dug wells, made roads, ran signal cables and manufactured improvised Jam tin grenades. 1/1st Field Co was near Morto Bay, 1/2nd near Pink Farm; each field company established two sections up with the infantry battalions in the front line. On 4 June the sappers of both companies attacked with the infantry at the Third Battle of Krithia. Each company had a half-battalion of the 6th Battalion Lancashire Fusiliers attached as a working party, 1/1st Fd Co following the first wave of the attack and 1/2nd Fd Co the second wave, in order to consolidate the ground captured. Four lines of Turkish trenches were taken, the sappers cleared Land mines, reversed captured trenches, and dug new ones. But the division's neighbours on the right failed in their attack, and the division had to give up much of the ground that it had won. A new position had to be dug to protect the flank. On the night of 6–7 June a party from 1/2nd Fd Co volunteered to cross to the isolated 'Old Turkish Redoubt' and help 8th Bn Lancashire Fusiliers to strengthen it; at dawn they acted as infantry to help hold the position against counter-attacks, and suffered heavy casualties. Both field companies were again heavily engaged at the Battle of Krithia Vineyard (8 August), with 1/1st consolidating the vineyard and 1/2nd working in Krithia Nullah. 42nd (EL) Division then took over a wider section of the front, with 1/1st moving to Fusilier Bluff and 1/2nd taking over Gully Ravine. These trenches were in bad condition, and the RE had all their men in the line to improve them. At Gully Ravine much damage was done by Turkish mines. In spite of some reinforcements, neither company could raise more than 30 fit men because of casualties and sickness.

When the engineer establishment was increased to three field companies per division, the 42nd was joined by the 1/2nd West Lancashire Field Company (sent from 55th (West Lancashire) Division, which was still in the UK). This company landed at Alexandria on 10 July and reached the division at Helles on 28 August to provide much-needed assistance. The CRE ordered the fresh company to take over all the work in the front and support lines, and withdrew the East Lancs companies to the reserve line.

By December the decision had been made to wind up the campaign. To cover the evacuation of Suvla Bay and Anzac Cove two mines were fired by 42nd (EL) Division on 19 December. The West Lancashire Fd Co attempted to seize the new crater at Fusilier Bluff, but just failed. 42nd (EL) Division was relieved by 13th (Western) Division and withdrawn from Helles to Mudros on 29 December, the exhausted East Lancs field companies among the first to go. The fresher West Lancs Fd Co, with some East Lancs officers, stayed on with 13th Division until the final evacuation from Helles on 9 January 1916, when they provided rearguards and blocked the route behind them.

==== Sinai ====
42nd (EL) Division was withdrawn from Mudros to Egypt 12–16 January. Lieutenant-Colonel Tennant was replaced as CRE by Lt-Col E.N. Mozley, DSO, a regular RE officer, and drafts arrived to refill the ranks. 1/2nd West Lancashire Field Company was withdrawn on 28 May 1916 and eventually sent to Salonika. It was replaced in 42nd (EL) Division by the 1/3rd East Lancashire Field Company, (Note: While attached to 66th (2nd East Lancashire) Division the 1/3rd Field Company was known as the 'One-and-threepennies', from the abbreviation for one shilling and threepence (1/3d) in pre-decimal sterling currency.) which had been formed on 2 December 1915 at Southport from the Third Line Depot and arrived at Alexandria from England aboard the Georgian on 13 June before joining on 27 June. The three companies carried out works at Suez and El Ferdan, until the Turks began another offensive. The sappers were issued with camel transport and moved up to the railhead at Pelusium, then 1/1st and 1/3rd Fd Cos accompanied two brigades of 42nd (EL) Division in the pursuit to Katia Oasis after the Battle of Romani (3–5 August). From then until the end of January 1917, 42nd (EL) Division protected the railhead as it slowly advanced across the Sinai Peninsula to El Arish, with the sappers sinking wells and developing water supplies ahead of the main body, and erecting telegraph lines.

On 28 January 1917, after reaching El Arish, 42nd (EL) Division was ordered to leave Egypt and join the British Expeditionary Force on the Western Front. It entrained for Kantara and then marched to Moascar, where it concentrated, and then moved to Alexandria for embarkation at the end of the month. On 3 February 1917 the three field companies were numbered 427th, 428th and 429th.

==== Western Front ====
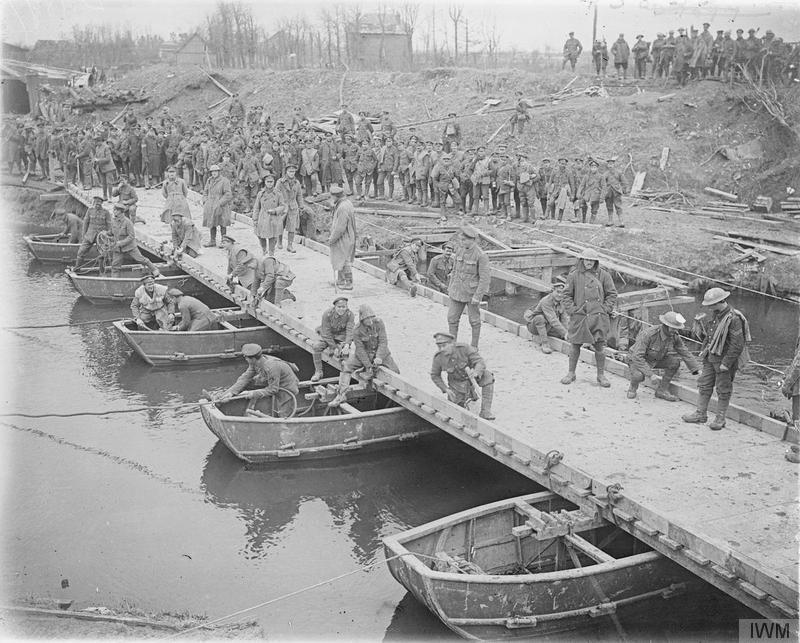
Royal Engineers laying a Pontoon bridge during the German retreat, March 1917.

427th Field Co landed from HM Transport Manitou at Marseille on 1 March 1917 and the last of the divisional RE (429th Fd Co aboard the Menominee) on 12 March; the whole was billeted in the area of Abbeville by 14 March. 427th Field Co moved up to the line the following day, attached to 1st Division, which was engaged in following the German retreat to the Hindenburg Line (Operation Alberich). Much road building, bridging and cable-laying was required in the devastated area around Brie-sur-Somme and Péronne. The rest of the divisional RE followed in early April, and by May the whole division took over a section of the new line between Épehy and Ronssoy, which had to be dug and wired and a reserve line prepared. On 17 May the division moved to Havrincourt Wood, constructing huts and tramways. On 3 June Lt-Col D.S. McInnes, CMG, DSO, took over as CRE from Lt-Col Mozley. The division then had a period of rest and training, when the REs practised bridging on the River Ancre.

On 20 August the division was sent to the Ypres Salient, with the RE quartered in dugouts in the ramparts of Ypres itself. On 6 September 125th Bde made an attack on the strongpoints of Iberian, Borry and Beck House farms, for which the RE prepared dumps of wiring material to consolidate the captures. However, the attack was a costly failure and the wiring parties were unable to get forward. This was the division's only involvement in the Third Ypres Offensive, and after only three weeks in the salient it was relieved and sent to the Nieuport sector.

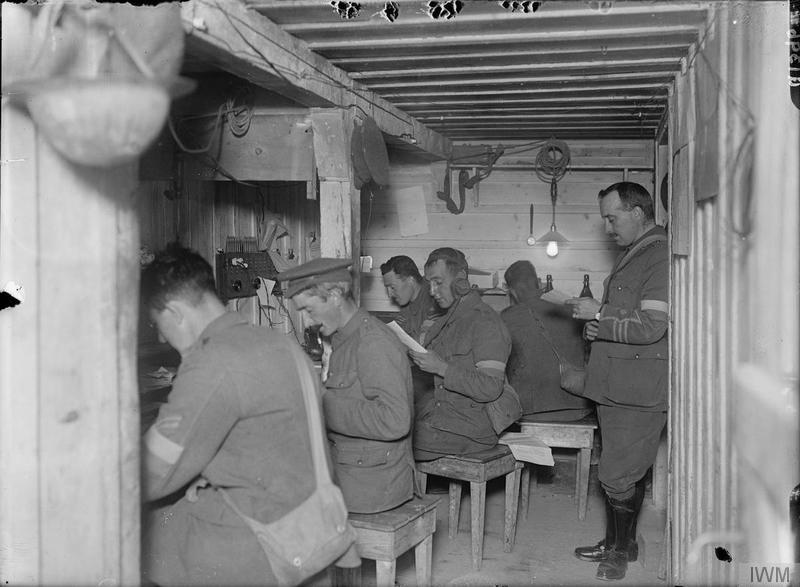
A Royal Engineers Signal Company at work on the Western Front.

The flooded country round Nieuport meant heavy work for the divisional RE, involving maintenance of floating bridges, dams and telephone lines that were frequently broken by shellfire: 428th and 429th Fd Cos each had more than 30 bridges in their charge. 427th Field Co had the job of managing infantry working parties repairing 'Bath Dam' (Dam 66), which controlled the flow of the River Yser. The field companies also built concrete machine gun posts and observation posts, and constructed an Aerial ropeway across the river. On 19 November the division was relieved, and it made a five-day overland march to the La Bassée sector.

The trench lines around Givenchy had been static since 1915, but during the winter of 1917–1918 there was considerable work for the sappers in repairing and improving the crumbling defence, and in constructing concrete dugouts in the support line (the 'Village Line'). Each infantry brigade had one of the field companies attached to it, together with a company from the divisional pioneer battalion (1/7th Bn Northumberland Fusiliers) after that joined in February 1918; 55th (West Lancashire) Division also lent its pioneer battalion (1/4th Bn South Lancashire Regiment). 179th Tunnelling Company, RE, worked in the division's area on defensive mining and assisted with dugout construction. On 20 December Lt-Col MacInnes was replaced as CRE by Lt-Col R.E.B. Pratt, DSO. Although the sector was relatively quiet during the winter, the signal office with 125th Bde was wiped out by shelling. There were also occasional trench raids, the largest of which was on 11 February when sappers from 429th Fd Co accompanied a party of 9th Bn Manchester Regiment into the enemy front line and destroyed three dugouts with gun-cotton charges; three of the sappers were awarded the Military Medal. The division was relieved by 55th (WL) Division on 15 February and went for training at Hinges and Busnes, but the sappers were frequently loaned back to 55th (WL) Division and to divisional HQ and the corps artillery for construction tasks. While out of the line there was an outbreak of Mange, and 428th Fd Co lost most of its transport horses. The division then went into General Headquarters (GHQ) Reserve.

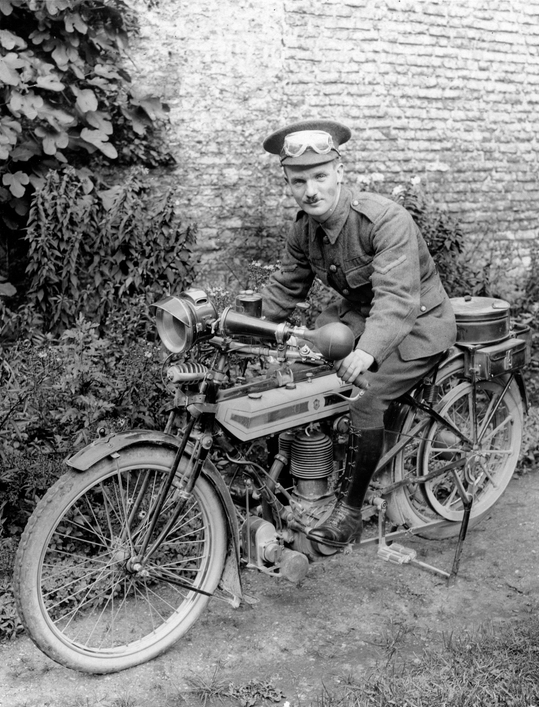
British motorcycle despatch rider in France.

==== Spring Offensive ====
When the German spring offensive opened on 21 March, 42nd (EL) Division was in GHQ Reserve, and was ordered forward on the night of 22/23 March. It rushed up without transport and took up positions near Bapaume the following night. The signal company was unable to function properly without its transport and equipment, and had to rely on its motorcycle Despatch riders. Much signal cable that was laid was wasted by the frequent movements of HQs, and casualties were heavy among signallers repairing shelled cable. The divisional RE were kept in reserve (428th Fd Co acting as escort for the divisional artillery), but after the initial enemy advance was halted on 26 March (the Battle of Bapaume), the field companies took turns acting as infantry in the line, patrolling No man's land and taking prisoners. The division then endured the 'Great Retreat', during which the field companies were continually engaged in digging and wiring successive trench positions. The division was out of the line from 7 to 15 April, and again from 6 May to 7 June, but apart from a four-day rest the sappers were at work on defence lines during this whole time.

Once the front had stabilised a complete system of Front, Support ('Red') and Reserve ('Purple') positions was prepared, with a switch line between the Red and Purple systems, connected by buried signal cables. The field companies were instructed in digging deep dugouts by 252nd Tunnelling Company. During May the 307th US Infantry Regiment was attached to 42nd (EL) Division for training, and the Pioneer Section was attached to the Divisional RE. In July Maj J.G. Riddick was promoted from command of 429 Fd Co to take over as CRE from Lt-Col Pratt.

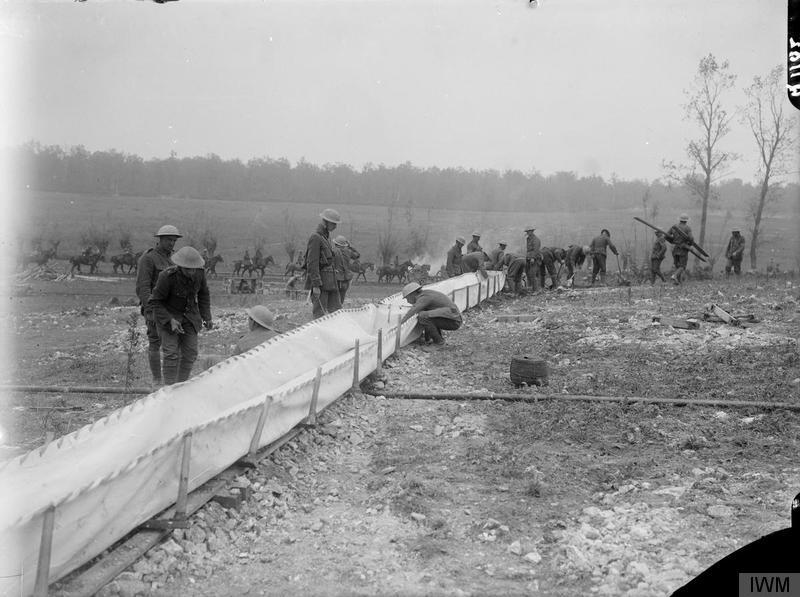
Royal Engineers erecting a canvas water trough for horses.

==== Hundred Days ====
After the victory of the Battle of Amiens on 8 July – the start of the Allied Hundred Days Offensive – the Germans in front of 42nd (EL) Division began to withdraw. The division reorganised for open warfare, forming self-contained brigade groups, each with two RE sections attached. On 21 August the division attacked at the Battle of Albert, capturing and consolidating all its objectives, and on 24 August it captured Miraumont. The division then continued the pursuit (the Second Battle of Bapaume) with one RE company (usually 429th Fd Co) on front-line work and restoring water supplies for men and horses, a second on water supply and road work, and the third in reserve working behind the lines. A section of 252nd Tunnelling Co worked with the forward company in clearing dugouts, mines and booby-traps. The signal company established visual, wireless and pigeon signalling until cables could be laid over the captured ground. The division was then relieved on 5 September and the REs were sent for training.

During the night of 21/22 September 42nd (EL) Division went back into the line, east of Havrincourt Wood, to prepare for an assault on the Hindenburg Line. The Signal Company put back into use a buried cable it had laid a year earlier. In two continuous days of fighting (the Battle of the Canal du Nord, 27–28 September) the East Lancashires leap-frogged through five successive objectives, with the sappers clearing the Hindenburg Line dugouts of booby-traps.

42nd (EL) Division went back into the line on 9 October, at Briastre on the River Selle, along which the retreating Germans had made a stand. Over following days the Germans made desperate attempts to destroy the bridgeheads taken over and extended by the East Lancashires. On the nights of 17 and 18 October 427th Fd Co erected four footbridges over the river, made from German telegraph poles. Then on 19 October, the night before the attack, they built four more footbridges and two Pontoon bridges under machine gun fire and gas shelling, but only suffered six casualties. The pontoon wagons had moved up with muffled wheels to maintain secrecy. The division crossed and then attacked at 02.00 on 20 October (the Battle of the Selle), securing all its objectives and consolidating against counter-attacks. The sappers then set to work repairing demolished railway bridges. Before the battle and during the subsequent advance, 428th Fd Co concentrated on developing water supplies, 429th Fd Co on road repair, and the Signal Company on laying cable from wagons.

The last phase of the offensive saw 42nd (EL) Division advancing through the Forêt de Mormal, where the roads were bad and had been cratered by the retreating enemy. These were made passable by the sappers and pioneers working day and night. The Signal Company struggled with over 50 per cent casualties from the Spanish flu outbreak and from combat (at one point No 3 Section were fighting as infantry alongside 126th Bde). The infantry pushed on to capture Hautmont on 7–8 November and with the help of the inhabitants improvised crossings over the River Sambre, the pontoon wagons catching up during the morning, By 20.00 on 9 November the sappers had a pontoon bridge and a repaired girder bridge open for traffic. The fighting was ended by the Armistice with Germany on 11 November.

After the Armistice the divisional engineers still had a heavy commitment to bridge repair and constructing winter accommodation for the division in the Charleroi area until February 1919, but thereafter demobilisation began in earnest. The last cadres of the companies returned to the UK at the beginning of April and demobilised at Oswestry. During the war the four companies of 42nd Divisional RE and Signals had lost 14 officers and 175 other ranks killed, died of wounds or sickness, or missing, and 29 members of the East Lancashire RE died while serving with other units.

=== 66th (2nd East Lancashire) Divisional Engineers ===
66th (2nd East Lancashire) Divisional insignia, First World War

When the 42nd (EL) Division left Bolton for Egypt in September 1914 it left behind a number of officers and men who were unfit or were not liable for overseas service. In October they moved to Winstanley Park, Wigan, and the engineers began to receive the first new recruits from Seymour Road. On 14 November the 2nd Line Divisional RE began to form at Southport as 2/1st, and 2/2nd East Lancashire Field Companies and 2/1st East Lancashire Signal Company. At first Lt-Col Newton acted as CRE of the division, and after he retired in November was replaced by Lt-Col H.A. Fielding. Although the companies were soon up to full strength, there was little equipment to train on, and only a few old .256-in Japanese Ariska rifles with which to mount guards. However, the second line had the use of the bridging equipment at the Old Trafford depot, and were able to train with it in the Marine Lake at Southport.

Training was also interrupted by the need to send reinforcement drafts to the 42nd (EL) Division serving at Gallipoli (one exceptionally large one going to the signal company in March 1915), and it was not until August 1915 that the 2nd East Lancashire Division was concentrated at Crowborough in East Sussex, and received its designation as 66th (2nd East Lancashire) Division, which was also taken by the signal company. When the divisional RE establishment was increased to three field companies in late 1915 1/3rd and 2/3rd Fd Cos joined 66th Divisional RE at Crowborough from the Third Line Depot by January 1916. (After training, the 1/3rd joined 42nd Division in Egypt in July 1916.)

In March 1916 the division moved from the hutted camp at Crowborough to Colchester Garrison where the RE were accommodated in the Cavalry Barracks. Lieutenant-Colonel Fielding retired with ill-health and was succeeded by Lt-Col Gordon Guggisberg. It was not until February 1917 that embarkation orders were received. The three field companies received their numbers as (430th, 431st and 432nd) just before they embarked at Southampton for Le Havre.

==== Western Front ====
66th (2nd EL) Division concentrated near Béthune and took over a sector of old line in considerable disrepair, which the divisional RE began to put into order. On 20 March the division sidestepped to the Hohenzollern Redoubt sector, where it carried out two trench raids in which RE parties accompanied the infantry to blow in enemy dugouts. At the end of June the division moved to the Flanders coast where it joined Fourth Army preparing to advance in support of the expected breakthrough at Ypres. The RE, however, were sent up to carry out works in the Nieuport area. 66th Divisional RE was with 1st Division when it received a sudden heavy attack from the Germans and was driven back behind the Yser. 66th (2nd EL) Division then took over the line and the RE (assisted by the 2nd Australian Tunnelling Company) strengthened the defences outside Dunkirk. They then prepared pontoon bridges to cross the Yser in the anticipated Ypres offensive, under the direction of Lt-Col Mozley, CRE of 42nd (EL) Division and Lt-Col G.C. Williams, who had taken over as CRE of 66th (2nd EL) Division when Lt-Col Guggisberg was promoted to command an infantry brigade in June.

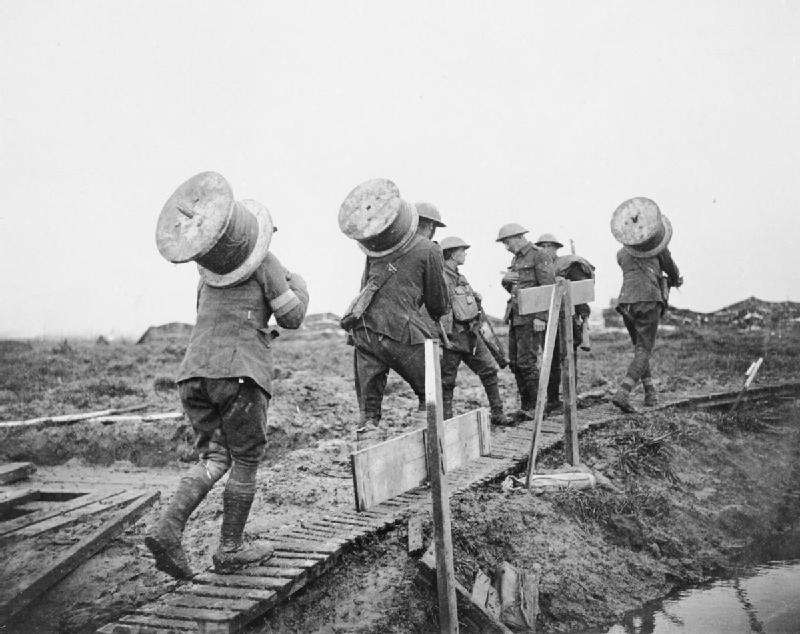
Royal Engineers bringing up telephone cable during the Battle of Poelcappelle.

66th (2nd EL) Division was relieved at Dunkirk by 42nd (EL) Division in September and was sent to the Ypres Salient. The infantry had a bad time in their first major battle at Poelcappelle on 9 October, but the RE were mostly engaged in roadmaking and making timber platforms to stop heavy artillery sinking into the mud. After the Ypres offensive came to a halt in late 1917, the divisional sappers were put to work building defences from the Menin Road to the Zonnebeke Road and then on the Broodseinde Ridge to hold the captured ground.

==== Spring Offensive ====
In February 1918, 66th (2nd EL) Division moved from Ypres to the Villers-Bretonneux sector. The divisional RE and the newly joined pioneer battalion, 1/5th Bn Border Regiment, were put to work on new defences to meet the expected German Spring Offensive. When the attack came on 21 March the forward sections fought with the outpost line until they were driven back. That night and next day the 430th and 431st Fd Cos wired the 'Green Line' behind the crumbling front, while 432nd Fd Co was employed as infantry. The German attack was renewed on 22 March, at the end of which 66th (2nd EL) division withdrew through the 50th (Northumbrian) Division, which manned the Green Line. The sappers next destroyed all the bridges over the Somme in their sector and then joined a scratch battalion in the Actions at the Somme crossings. The line was turned elsewhere, and for the next few days of retreat the sappers took part in a series of stands while destroying camps and dumps before they fell into enemy hands. On 30 March the division reached Hangard Wood, where it was relieved by French troops and went for rest in Amiens.

After their great losses, the infantry units of 66th (2nd EL) Division were reduced to cadres on 9 April and were used to train American troops. The divisional RE, which still had half its manpower, was split up: 430th Fd Co remained with the division while the other two became GHQ troops, directing Chinese and Portuguese labour battalions in constructing new defence lines through the summer months.

==== Hundred Days ====
66th Division was reformed on 18 September 1918, mainly with non-Lancashire units including the South African Brigade, and the divisional RE marched to rejoin it near Arras. The field companies exchanged some men to train the new pioneer battalion (9th Bn Gloucestershire Regiment). The sappers preceded the division to the Épehy area where they were engaged in roadmaking, but the whole division moved into the line on 7 October and the field companies joined their brigade groups. 66th Division attacked before dawn next day (the Second Battle of Cambrai). It took all its objectives by the end of the day, and continued the attack the next day against light opposition. From 10 to 12 October it pursued the enemy to the River Selle, parties of sappers following closely behind the infantry to consolidate captured positions.

430th Field Co attempted to build a medium bridge over the Selle at Montay, but was driven back by enemy fire. The following night 432nd Fd Co succeeded in getting four light bridges across. There was then a period of reconnaissance and preparation before the Battle of the Selle began on the night of 17/18 October. That night 431st and 432nd Fd Cos and 9th Gloucesters put eight bridges across, consisting of duckboards resting on petrol-tin rafts. They then cut the enemy wire before the infantry attacked at dawn. Once the South Africans had stormed across, the sappers began clearing roadblocks and erecting trestle bridges in Le Cateau. The divisional RE remained here even after the infantry had been withdrawn for rest on 20 October. 431st Field Co built a lorry bridge in Le Cateau, while 430th and 432nd followed 18th (Eastern) Division, strengthening the temporary bridges thrown over the River Richemont by that formation's sappers.

The division returned to the front and on 9 November part of it joined 'Bethell's Force' under the divisional commander, Maj-Gen Hugh Bethell, to continue the pursuit. This mobile force included all three field companies, the signal company and the 9th Gloucesters, and kept up pressure on the retreating Germans until the Armistice came into force two days later.

66th Divisional RE remained in France rebuilding bridges until demobilisation began in January 1919. This was completed on 13 June.

=== Third Line Depot ===
By mid-1915 the decision was made not to supply drafts to the 1st Line 42nd (EL) Division from the 2nd Line 66th (EL) Division, but to form 3rd Line training units for the purpose. The 3rd Line Depot, East Lancs RE, was formed at Old Trafford in August 1915. In September it moved to Southport, with three field companies and a signal company (total about 1200 men) under command. This depot then formed the new 1/3rd and 2/3rd Fd Cos and sent them to join the 66th Division at Crowborough by January 1916. (After training, the 1/3rd joined 42nd Division in Egypt in July 1916.) At the beginning of 1916 the depot moved to the Western Command Reserve Training Centre, RE, at Caernarfon, joining the 3rd Line RE of the 55th (WL) and 53rd (Welsh) Divisions. Later the signal companies were sent to their own training centre. As drafts were sent to the divisions serving overseas the numbers of recruits under training declined and the three field companies were combined into a single 435th (East Lancs) Reserve Field Company. The Territorial RE training centres were closed on 31 December 1917 and training was concentrated in a central training organisation, most of the men from Caernarvon being transferred to 5th Reserve Battalion, RE, at Christchurch, Dorset.

=== 648th (East Lancashire) Field Company ===
Once the Third Line had been established, the unfit men and those remaining TF men who had only signed up for Home Service were separated to join brigades of coast defence units (termed Provisional units from June 1915). 9th Provisional Brigade was formed in East Kent from Lancashire units and details from local Home counties units. By September 1915 it included the 9th Provisional Field Company, RE, and the 9th Provisional Signals Section, RE. After the Military Service Act 1916 swept away the Home/Foreign service distinction all TF soldiers became liable for overseas service, if medically fit. The provisional brigades' role thus expanded to include physical conditioning to render men fit for drafting overseas. Late in 1916 the War Office decided to form them into new home service divisions; in November 1916 9th Provisional Bde moved from Margate to Blackpool in Lancashire to form the basis of the new 73rd Division. The provisional units all received new designations based on their parent units: the field company became 648th (East Lancashire) Field Company in March 1917, while the signal section expanded to form 73rd Divisional Signal Company.

After assembling in Lancashire, 73rd Division moved in early January 1917 to join Southern Army (Home Forces), stationed in Essex and Hertfordshire. In December that year the War Office decided to break up the division, and this was carried out on 4 March 1918. The signal company was disbanded, but the field company was reorganised as 648th (Home Counties) Army Troops Company, RE, and went to join the BEF on 23 June.

== Interwar ==
42nd (East Lancashire) Division began to reform at home in 1920, with Lt-Col J.G. Riddick re-appointed CRE on 16 February. When the TF was reconstituted as the Territorial Army (TA) in 1921, the field companies were renumbered 200–203 (East Lancashire). 200 Company was a Field Park Company; in 1924 it was absorbed into divisional RE HQ. The signal company transferred to the new Royal Corps of Signals as 42nd (East Lancashire) Divisional Signals.

In 1924 Supplementary Reserve (formerly Special Reserve) companies of the RE were formed, and 104 (East Lancashire) Army Troops Company was attached to the 42nd at Seymour Grove. The 42nd also had the Manchester RE Cadet Corps attached to it.

== Second World War ==
=== Mobilisation ===
Following the Munich Crisis the TA was doubled in size. In 1939, 203 Fd Co moved from Manchester to Smethwick and was re-roled as the Fd Park Co, while a new 200 Fd Co was reformed at Manchester. Once again, 42nd (EL) Division formed 66th Division as its duplicate: this had 255 and 256 Fd Cos and 258 Fd Park Co, all at Manchester. 66th Division became active on 29 September 1939. 257 Field Co was formed at Manchester as a GHQ unit, and was only assigned to 66th Division on 19 December 1939.

=== 42nd Divisional Engineers ===
42nd (EL) Division embarked for France on 12 April 1940 and joined the British Expeditionary Force (BEF). 200 Field Co had left the division on 18 October 1939, but returned soon after arrival in France. 202 Field Co left for 52nd (Lowland) Infantry Division on 11 April and was replaced on 14 May by 250 Fd Co from 54th (East Anglian) Infantry Division. 202 (East Lancs) Fd Co continued to serve with 52nd (Lowland) Divisional RE for the rest of the war, including a brief expedition to France as part of the 'Second BEF' after Dunkirk, and then in the Campaign in North West Europe in 1944–45.

==== Dunkirk ====
When the German offensive in the west opened on 10 May, the BEF advanced into Belgium in accordance with 'Plan D', with 42nd (EL) Division moving up to the Escaut, where it was in reserve, the RE preparing bridges for demolition. However, the German Army broke through the Ardennes to the east, forcing the BEF to withdraw again, and by 19 May the whole force was back across the Escaut. The Germans established bridgeheads across the Escaut at dawn on 20 May, but it was the deep penetration further east that forced the BEF to withdraw. Next day 42nd (EL) Division covering Tournai was under attack, and by 23 May it was back on the next canal line.

By 26 May the BEF was cut off and the decision was made to evacuate it through Dunkirk (Operation Dynamo). On 27 May 42nd (EL) Division was ordered to withdraw from the canal line to the River Lys, and the following day to the River Yser, defending the south side of the Dunkirk 'pocket'. The division completed its evacuation on 31 May.

=== 42nd Assault Regiment ===
After Dunkirk 42nd (EL) Division reformed and re-equipped in the UK. On 1 November 1941 it was converted into 42nd Armoured Division, with the divisional RE reorganised as follows:

- 200 (East Lancs) Fd Co – became 16 Field Squadron
- 201 (East Lancs) Fd Co – became 17 Field Squadron (617 Fd Sqn from 1 March 1943)
- 203 (East Lancs) Fd Park Co – became 149 Field Park Squadron
- 250 (East Anglian) Fd Co – left 14 October 1941

79th Armoured Division's formation badge.

On 17 October 1943 42nd Armoured Division was disbanded, but the divisional RE was converted into 42nd Assault Regiment, RE, in 1st Assault Brigade, RE, of 79th Armoured Division. The regiment was equipped with the Armoured Vehicle Royal Engineers (AVRE), and had the following organisation:

- 16 Assault Sqn
- 617 Assault Sqn
- 149 Assault Park Sqn – combined with 1st Assault Bde HQ May 1944 to January 1945
- 222 Assault Sqn – 222 (2nd London) Fd Co joined from 47th (London) Infantry Division
- 557 Assault Sqn – 557 (West Lancs) Fd Co joined from 55th (WL) Division
- Signal detachment, Royal Corps of Signals
- Light Aid Detachment, Royal Electrical and Mechanical Engineers

Although the regiment trained hard in its new role for the Allied invasion of Normandy, (Operation Overlord), it was not until April 1944 that the first production Churchill AVREs arrived. When D Day arrived, 42nd Assault Rgt was not committed at first, and regimental HQ (RHQ) only landed at Juno Beach with 16, 222 and 617 Sqns on 17 August. 557 Assault Sqn remained at Parham, West Sussex and was expanded to become a training regiment supplying AVRE crews to the units in NW Europe; later it also took over the role of 'F Wing', 1 Assault Bde's experimental unit. For a week after the regiment's arrival in Normandy, the whole of 1st Assault Bde was concentrated at the River Orne for training on the new Class 50/60 tank raft.

==== Le Havre ====
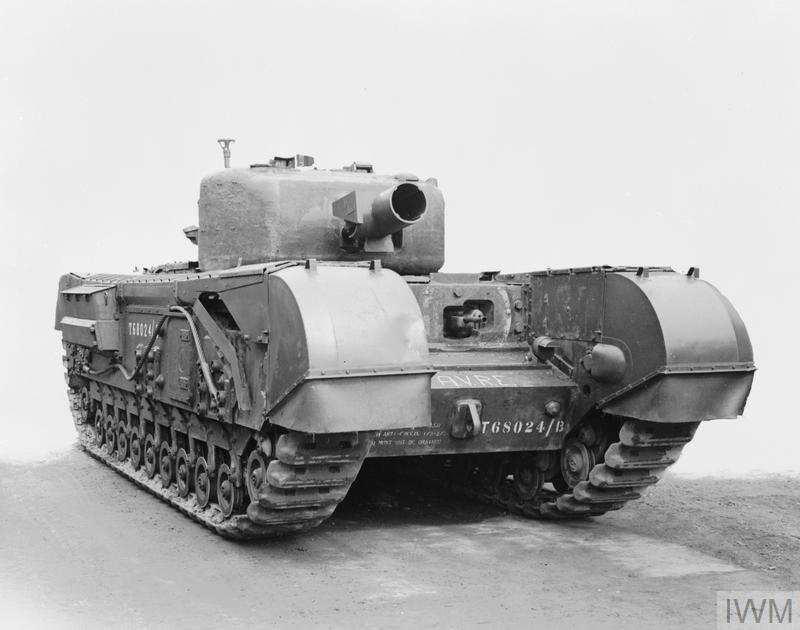
A Churchill AVRE showing the Petard demolition mortar.

42nd Assault Rgt went into action in Operation Astonia to capture Le Havre on the evening of 10 September. Each attacking infantry brigade was supported by an assault team from 79th Armoured Division: a mixed group of Churchill AVREs, Sherman Crab mine flails and Churchill Crocodile flamethrowing tanks. 617 and part of 222 Assault Sqns provided the AVREs for 56 Bde and 2 Troop of 222 Sqn for 146 Bde, both of 49th (West Riding) Division; 16 Assault Sqn supported 152 Bde of 51st (Highland) Division. Three of the chosen lanes of attack crossed the fortress's anti-tank ditch. For these the regiment employed bridgelayer tanks and the 'Conger' mine clearance device (a flexible hose filled with liquid explosive) for its first use in action. An AVRE of 222 Assault Sqn deployed an older 'Snake' (utilising a rigid pipe instead of a flexible pipe), but this exploded as it was pushed across the ditch. The AVRE was then put out of action reversing over a mine, and the following bridgelaying AVRE also struck a mine. Thus the 'Hazel' lane through the defences had to be abandoned. 222 Assault Sqn also lost another bridgelayer, but a third successfully bridged the anti-tank ditch. 617 Assault Sqn then had the role of passing through the cleared lanes to support 49th (WR) Division's infantry against the strongpoints. Several AVREs were knocked out by 88 mm anti-tank (A/T) guns, but the remainder silenced enemy guns and used their Petard mortars against concrete positions. The follow-up attack by 152 Bde required three more lanes across the ditch and minefields, and 16 Assault Sqn used Snakes and bridgelayers. Once the town was entered, 2 Trp of 222 Sqn pushed on with 146 Bde to take Harfleur, destroying A/T guns and roadblocks as they went. The capture of Le Havre was completed on 12 September. Lance-Sergeant Charles Finan was awarded a Military Medal (MM) for working with his crew dismounted for 6 hours to clear roadblocks and mines while under fire, and Captain Ambrose Warde received a Military Cross (MC).

==== Low Countries ====
Squadrons of 79th Armoured Division's regiments were often widely scattered and not under regimental control. For example, 617 Assault Sqn took part in Operation Switchback, the Canadian operations to clear the Breskens Pocket, and with 3rd Division against Overloon, where L/Sgt Finan won a bar to his MM for dropping his bridge with precision over the Molen Beek while under A/T fire, having to operate the mechanism from outside the tank. 16 Assault Sqn pushed a 60 feet (18 m) Bailey bridge on sledges to allow 7th Armoured Division to cross a river and advance after the capture of 's-Hertogenbosch, and then one of its AVRE bridgelayers laid and crossed a Small Box Girder (SBG) bridge as the first vehicle to enter Tilburg. On 4 November 51st (Highland) Division attacked towards 's-Hertogenbosch with support from 79th Division, including a troop of 222 Assault Sqn, which transported an SBG bridge across 4 miles (6.4 km) of difficult terrain and laid it successfully over a 28 feet (8.5 m) ditch to allow armour to cross.

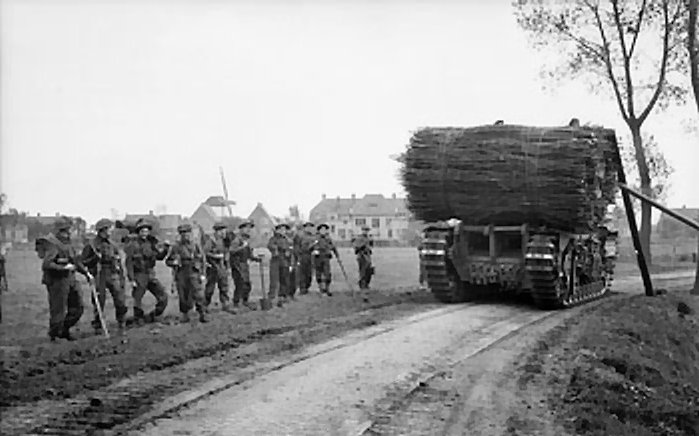
A fascine-carrying AVRE passes infantry during the attack on 's-Hertogenbosch.

For the attack on the Geilenkirchen salient (Operation Clipper) the inexperienced 84th US Division came under British command, and was provided with 617 Assault Sqn's AVREs for support. One of its crews became the first sappers to enter Germany, though their vehicle was trapped in a cutting, lost its bridge, and remained on the German side of the frontier all night under fire. A troop of the squadron traversed an A/T ditch with a Fascine and an assault bridge, and became the first Allied troops into the town. Captain Ellis Shaw was awarded the US Silver Star after his troop knocked out five pillboxes in the Siegfried Line the following day.

Early in 1945 the regiment took part in Operation Blackcock to clear the Roer Triangle, in which 16 and 222 Assault Sqns were deployed. On 17 January a troop of 222 Sqn laid three bridges for the attack on Susteren, while the other two troops operated with two columns formed by 8th Armoured Bde and 52nd (Lowland) Division. Meanwhile, two troops of 16 Sqn supported 43rd (Wessex) Division with fascines and assault bridges to cross the Saeffelen Beek; although one crossing proved impossible due to the thaw, the other was made. The third troop distinguished itself by pushing an 80 feet (24 m) Bailey bridge some 4.5 miles (7.2 km) on icy roads using a skid of their own devising to cross a crater north of Geilenkirchen. Captain Herbert Baynton-Jones of 222 Sqn was awarded an MC for dismounting to take control of an RE mine-clearing detachment and then leading his troop of AVREs to attack a village with their petards.

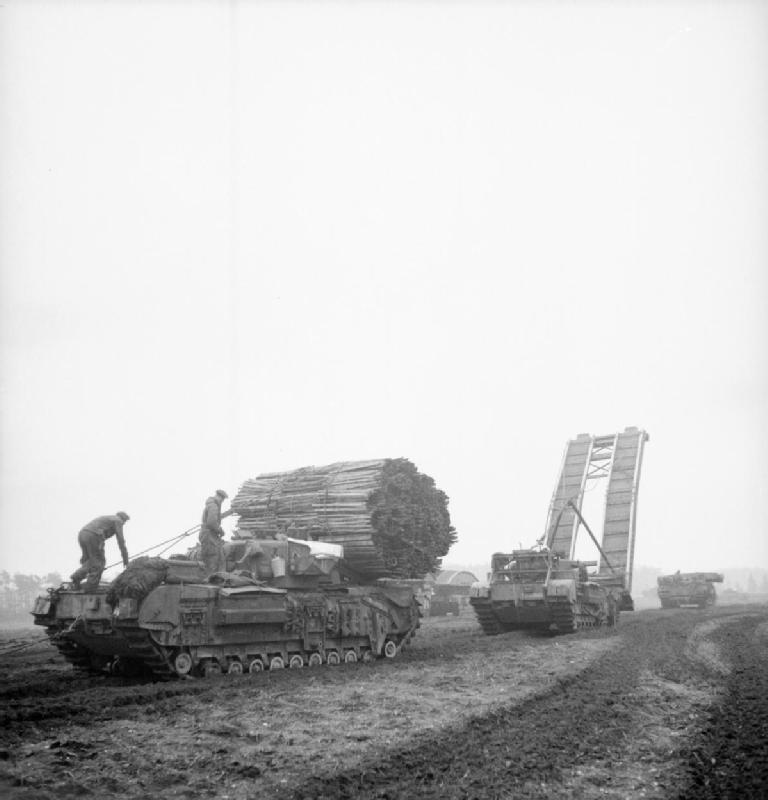
AVREs with SBG bridge and fascines move up during Operation Veritable.

==== Germany ====
42nd Assault Rgt next participated in the Battle of the Reichswald (Operation Veritable). On 8 February 222 Assault Sqn supported 51st (Highland) Division, which advanced down three lanes cleared by flails. In each lane the flails were followed by two AVRE bridgelayers and two carrying fascines. In the right hand lane all went well; the centre lane was blocked by a knocked-out flail tank, but the AVREs completed a fascine crossing by the evening; the third lane was impassable due to mud. 222 Assault Sqn then helped 51st HD to capture Hervorst on 17 February; during the fighting 3 Trp attacked and destroyed a large pillbox with petards. Then on 19–20 February the squadron helped 51st HD capture Goch, penetrating the defences and reducing pillboxes.

While Veritable continued, the regiment was withdrawn to train for the Rhine crossing (Operation Plunder). 617 Assault Sqn learned to operate Class 50/60 rafts, and then trained the other two squadrons and those of 5th and 6th Assault Rgts in turn. These novel rafts consisted of five pontoons with a section of roadway to carry a tank. For the final stretch of their journey to the riverbank, the heavy pontoons on sledges were towed by AVREs. Once launched, the ferries were hauled to and fro across the river by RAF Barrage balloon winches. Much of the other specialist equipment for the crossing was manufactured by 149 Assault Park Sqn.

For the crossing on the night of 23/24 March, 42nd Assault Rgt was assigned to 15th (Scottish) Division leading XII Corps' attack at Xanten, with 16, 222 and 81 Assault Sqns (the latter from 6th Assault Rgt) under command to operate the rafts. 617 Assault Sqn was with 5th Assault Rgt rafting 51st HD of XXX Corps at Rees. Having hauled their pontoons through the mud, 42nd Assault Rgt began assembling its rafts at 02.45 on 24 March, and had three operational by 21.00 that night. Two ferry points were used, each with two rafts; these were codenamed 'Abdullah' and 'Ardath' operated by 222 and 16 Assault Sqns respectively, 81 Assault Sqn being divided between them. Two platoons of an RE field company began preparing the exits on the east bank. Three light airborne dozers from 87 Assault Dozer Sqn, RE, were sent across in Buffalo amphibious vehicles to improve the exits. Led by Staff Sgt Sweeney of RHQ 42nd Assault Rgt the dozer crews had to deal with snipers and enemy infantry and machine gun posts before they could reach the intended exit point. It is recorded that the little dozers raised their blades as shields and advanced 'like angry crabs' (S/Sgt Sweeney received the MM). Two heavy bulldozers from 149 Assault Park Sqn were then rafted across to improve the exits. 42nd Assault Rgt operated its ferries until the afternoon of 26 March when a Bailey bridge was completed, during which period it carried 311 tanks and self-propelled guns and a few wheeled vehicles. Similarly, 617 Assault Sqn operated 'Tilbury' ferry in 5th Assault Rgt's area. The squadron's reconnaissance party, led by Capt Richard Stafford, overcame heavy enemy fire and wireless failures to carry out its work rowing a folding boat with a failed motor (Stafford was awarded the MC). The exit was blocked by eight bogged amphibious Sherman DD tanks, but at the urging of senior officers the first vehicle rafted across was an Armoured recovery vehicle and this with a bulldozer eventually cleared the exit. By midday both rafts were in operation.

After the Rhine crossing, 21st Army Group fanned out over North Germany towards the River Elbe. On 28 March 617 Assault Sqn launched a skid Bailey bridge over the River Aa for Guards Armoured Division to pass through 3rd Division and continue XXX Corps' advance. Later it dropped fascines in a diversion that allowed British armour to make its way round two large craters, then dropped an SBG bridge near Huissen on 3 April, where the sappers also cleared a minefield and used their AVREs' Besa machine guns to support an infantry attack by 49th (WR) Division with First Canadian Army. 16 Assault Sqn formed part of a 79th Armoured Division group under 22nd Dragoons supporting 185 Bde of 3rd Division, laying an SBG bridge across the Twente Canal and reaching Lingen by 6 April. By 10 April two troops were with 43rd (W) Division, clearing roadblocks and felled trees that impeded the advance. By 8 April it was operating with 49th (WR) Division. 222 Assault Sqn was in Second Army Reserve, then supported 3rd Division in crossing the flooded approaches to Bremen, using their petards to flush defenders out of strongpoints, and skid Baileys to cross breaches in the causeways. 16 Assault Sqn helped 43rd (W) and 52nd (L) Division into the city's outskirts. Most of Bremen was in British hands by 27 April. 21st Army Group continued its advance until the German surrender at Lüneburg Heath on 4 May.

It was intended to reorganise 42 Assault Rgt for service in the Far East, but this was cancelled after the Surrender of Japan, and 222 Aslt Sqn was disbanded at Garlstorf in Germany.

=== 66th Divisional Engineers ===
On the outbreak of the Second World War, the 66th Infantry Division was formed. This formation was only active until 22 June 1940, when it was disbanded. Most of the divisional RE became X Corps Troops RE (X CTRE) in Northern Command, while 257 Fd Co went to 59th (Staffordshire) Divisional Engineers and was replaced by 242 (Lowland) Fd Co from 52nd (Lowland) Division). 257 (East Lancs) Fd Co continued to serve with 59th (Staffordshire) Divisional Engineers for the rest of the war, landing in Normandy in June 1944 and serving as GHQ troops for the remainder of the North West Europe Campaign.

=== IX Corps Troops RE ===
In early 1941 X Corps HQ went to Egypt with VIII CTRE, leaving its own engineers behind. X CTRE became IX Corps Troops RE (IX CTRE) on 9 April 1941, with the following organisation:

- 242 (Lowland) Fd Co
- 255 (East Lancs) Fd Co
- 258 (East Lancs) Fd Park Co
- 558 (West Lancs) Fd Co – joined from 55th (West Lancs) Division by July 1942

256 (East Lancs) Fd Co did not join IX CTRE but remained under War Office control; it later joined 78th Division and fought with it to the end of the war through the Tunisian and Italian campaigns.

==== Tunisia ====
IX Corps arrived in North Africa to join the Tunisian Campaign in March 1943, but IX CTRE was delayed. The personnel ship carrying 558 Fd Co was sunk and the men came ashore short of weapons and personal kit, while the motor transport ship carrying 242 and 255 Fd Cos failed to join its convoy and they were delayed. The CRE, Lt-Col J.V.C. Moberley, got 558 Fd Co and 258 Fd Park Co up to the front by mid-March. The RE units with IX Corps built approach roads for the attack on Kairouan to cut off the Axis retreat during the Battle of Wadi Akarit. For the corps' next advance 558 Fd Co was among the sappers tasked with preparing 20 miles (32 km) of hill tracks in No man's land for an armoured thrust; to achieve surprise most of this work was completed at the last moment.

Operation Vulcan was launched on 22 April to break through to Tunis. On IX Corps' front it was initially successful, but then efforts to find a way through for the armour added another 100 miles (160 km) of sand tracks to the road maintenance commitment. IX CTRE also had to establish 19 water points in the area. The offensive was renewed on 5 May (Operation Strike), once again entailing construction of approach routes for the armour. The Axis forces in Tunisia surrendered on 12 May.

=== 16th GHQ Troops RE ===
At the end of the campaign IX Corps was disbanded and IX CTRE was redesignated 16th GHQ Troops RE (GHQTRE) on 31 May. It later proceeded to join the Italian Campaign.

On 22 January 1944 16th GHQTRE came into the line on the Garigliano as part of the massive bridging operations during the Battle of Monte Cassino. The fighting at Cassino bogged down, and three major assaults failed. The fourth attempt, (Operation Diadem) began on 11 May with 16th GHQTRE acting as corps RE for II Polish Corps.

The beginning of August 1944 found the Allies facing the Gothic Line. For Eighth Army's advance it was necessary to reopen two heavily demolished roads towards Ancona. A mass of RE troops and equipment, including 16th GHQTRE, was assembled under 8th Army Group RE for the work of bridgebuilding and road repair.

X CTRE left the Italian theatre for North West Europe in early 1945, and 16th GHQTRE reverted to the role of X CTRE. As Eighth Army advanced towards the River Po in April 1945, XIII Corps took the lead, and X Corps took over responsibility for its sector. After the Po was crossed, X CTRE took over maintenance of the bridges while XIII Corps continued the pursuit of the defeated enemy, who surrendered on 2 May.

=== 104 (East Lancashire) Army Troops Company ===
The Supplementary Reserve company attached to 42nd Divisional Engineers, 104 (East Lancs) Army Troops Co, also went to France in 1940 working on the BEF's Lines of Communications. After Dunkirk it served in Home Defence under Northern Command until 1944. It then operated in North West Europe as part of 21st Army Group 1944–45.

== Postwar ==
When the TA was reformed in 1947, 42nd Divisional RE was reconstituted at Manchester as 123 Engineer Regiment, with 200, 201 and 202 Field Squadrons and 203 Field Park Sqn once again. It still formed part of 42nd Division and derived its seniority in the TA from the 3rd Lancashire Engineer Volunteers of 1901. In 1961 the division was reorganised and the regiment became 42nd (Lancashire) Division/District RE (later the subtitle became 'Lancashire and Cheshire').

When the TA was reduced into the Territorial and Army Volunteer Reserve in 1967, 42nd (L&C) Div/District RE merged with 107 Engineer Regiment (originally the 55th (West Lancashire) Divisional RE) to form 75th Engineer Regiment (Volunteers), to which the 42nd supplied HQ Sqn at Failsworth and 202 Training Sqn at Clifton. 202 Squadron absorbed the cadre of the Duke of Lancaster's Own Yeomanry in 1969 and adopted that unit's name as its subtitle until the Yeomanry was reformed in 1971. 202 Squadron re-roled as a field sqn in 1977, disbanded in 1999 and reformed in 75 Engineer Rgt in 2006. HQ Squadron was designated as 201 HQ Sqn in 1993, but reduced to a Troop in 2006.

== Insignia ==
When the 42nd (EL) division arrived on the Western Front in 1917 it adopted a formation flash of a diamond divided horizontally, white over red. All its subordinate units adopted variations on the diamond: 427th, 428th and 429th Fd Cos had red diamonds carrying the dark blue numbers 1, 2 and 3 respectively; divisional RE HQ wore a red diamond containing a narrow blue diamond outline. Presumably the signal sections wore the badges of their respective HQs. In the Second World War, the 42nd (EL) Infantry and 42nd Armoured divisions adopted a red diamond with a white centre as their badge. 42nd Assault Regiment retained this badge after the disbandment of 42nd Armoured Division, wearing it in addition to the normal formation badge of 79th Armoured Division. From 1947 the 42nd divisional flash was the old red diamond outline bearing a Red Rose of Lancaster on the white centre.

== Commanding officers ==
The commanding officers of the unit include the following:

- Lt-Col H.T. Crook, 28 February 1901

Commanding Royal Engineer (CRE), 42nd (EL) Division:

- Lt-Col C.E. Newton, 12 March 1913
- Lt-Col S.L. Tennant, 31 August 1914
- Lt-Col E.N. Mozley, 16 April 1916
- Maj L.F. Wells, acting 24 May–21 June 1916
- Maj A.N. Lawford, acting 26 September–21 November 1916 and 8 January–13 February 1917
- Maj J.G. Riddick, acting 20 May–3 June 1917 and 28 June–8 July 1918
- Lt-Col D.S. McInnes, 3 June 1917
- Lt-Col R.E.B. Pratt, 22 December 1917
- Maj J.H. Mousley, 21–28 June 1918
- Lt-Col A.T. Shakspear, 8 July 1918
- Lt-Col J.G. Riddick, DSO, 12 July 1918, reappointed 16 February 1920 (brevet Colonel 16 February 1924)
- Lt-Col W.S. Beaumont, MC, 21 November 1926
- Lt-Col W.G. Codling, MC, TD, 21 November 1932
- Lt-Col W.H. Grindley, 19 February 1936
- Lt-Col J.L. Lishman, 1940

CRE, 66th (2nd EL) Division:

- Lt-Col H.A. Fielding, 9 November 1914
- Lt-Col Gordon Guggisberg, CMG, DSO, 20 November 1916
- Major G.S. Knox, CMG, acting 10 May 1917
- Lt-Col G.C. Williams, CMG, DSO, 12 June 1917
- Capt C.A. West, acting 15 March 1918
- Lt-Col G.J.P. Goodwin, DSO, 2 April 1918
- Maj S.H. Morgan, acting 11–19 August and 1 September 1918
- Lt-Col O.S. Davies, DSO, 30 September 1918

CRE, 42nd Assault Regiment:

- Lt-Col J.F.D. Savage, DSO, 1944

CRE, IX Corps Troops RE:

- Lt-Col J.V.C. Moberley, DSO, OBE, 1943

CRE, 16th GHQ Troops, RE:

- Lt-Col G.O.N. Thompson, DSO, OBE, 1944

== Honorary Colonels ==
The following officers served as Honorary Colonel of the unit:

- William Johnson Galloway, TD, of W & J Galloway & Sons of Old Trafford, and MP for Manchester South West, formerly of the Duke of Lancaster's Own Yeomanry, appointed 25 June 1902
- Maj-Gen William Henry Beach, CB, CMG, DSO, formerly of the Royal Engineers, commander of 42nd (EL) Division, appointed 29 April 1931

== Memorials ==
In 1922 a marble memorial was unveiled at the Seymour Grove drill hall carrying bronze plaques with the names of 150 members of the unit who died in the First World War. This was later moved to the TA Centre in Failsworth.

A memorial plaque with the 41 names of the 42nd (EL) Signal Company who died on service during the First World War was unveiled at the Brooks Bar drill hall on 21 October 1934. It was moved to the Norman Road TA Centre in 1955 and is now in the foyer.

== External Sources ==
- British Army units from 1945 on
- Great War Forum
- Imperial War Museum, War Memorials Register
- Maj I.G. Kelly, 42 Signal Squadron History (archive site).
- The Long, Long Trail
- Orders of Battle at Patriot Files
- Land Forces of Britain, the Empire and Commonwealth (Regiments.org)
- Graham Watson, The Territorial Army 1947
