= 141st Regiment Royal Armoured Corps =

The 141st Regiment Royal Armoured Corps (The Buffs) (141 RAC) was an armoured regiment of the British Army, part of the Royal Armoured Corps, raised during World War II.

== Origins ==
141 RAC was raised in November 1941 by the conversion to the armoured role of the 7th Battalion, Buffs (Royal East Kent Regiment), a hostilities-only battalion raised in July 1940. The battalion had been assigned to the 209th Independent Infantry Brigade (Home), serving alongside the 8th, 9th and 10th battalions of the Buffs. As with all infantry battalions transferred to the Royal Armoured Corps, they would have continued to wear their Buffs cap badges on the black beret of the RAC.

The regiment landed on the beaches of Normandy in June 1944 and fought as part of the 79th Armoured Division throughout the Battle of Normandy and the subsequent campaign in Northwest Europe until the end of the war in Europe in May 1945.

== Publications ==
- George Forty, British Army Handbook 1939–1945, Stroud: Sutton Publishing, 1998, ISBN 0 7509 1403 3.
- Joslen, H. F. (2003) [1960]. Orders of Battle: Second World War, 1939–1945. Uckfield, East Sussex: Naval and Military Press. ISBN 978-1-84342-474-1.
- Land Forces of Britain, the Empire and Commonwealth
