= 22nd Dragoons =

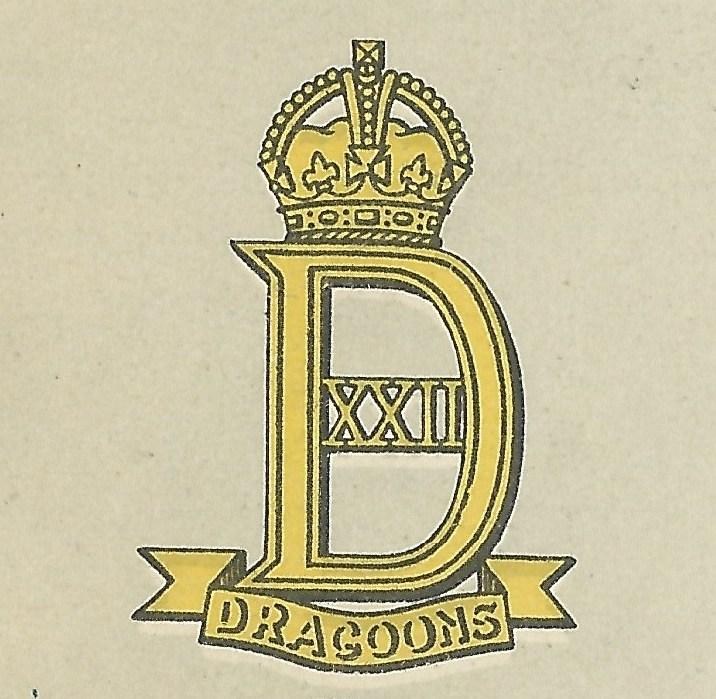
- 22nd Dragoons cap badge ca 1941
- Active: 1716–1718, 1779–1783, 1794–1802, 1802-1820, 1940–1945
- Country: United Kingdom
- Branch: British Army
- Type: Cavalry regiment
- Part of: Royal Armoured Corps (1940-1945)

The 22nd Dragoons was the title held by five separate Cavalry regiments of the British Army raised and disbanded between 1716 and 1945. The last regiment of this name existed during the Second World War, from 1 December 1940 until 30 November 1945.

== History ==
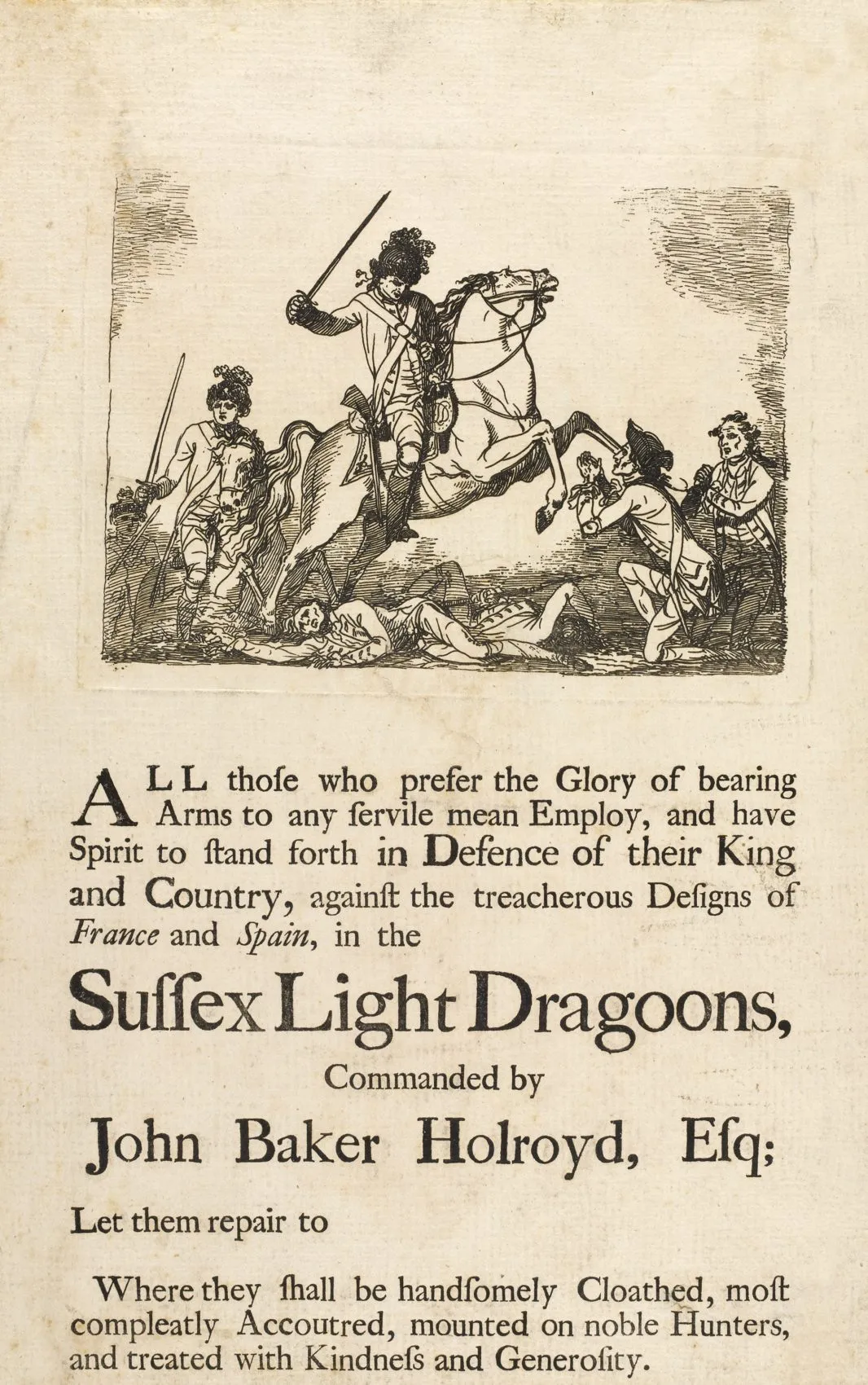
Recruitment poster for the 22nd (Light) Dragoons

The first regiment to bear the title 22nd Dragoons was raised in 1716. Also known as Viscount Mountjoy's Regiment of Dragoons, it appeared on the Army List on 16 February 1716, but was disbanded in 1718. In 1779, John Baker Holroyd raised a light dragoon regiment that was named 22nd (Light) Dragoons, which was disbanded in 1783. On 24 February 1794, William, Viscount Feilding raised the next regiment to use the title 22nd (Light) Dragoons; this regiment lasted slightly longer, being disbanded in 1802 with the onset of peace. However, the 25th Dragoons (raised for service in India by F E Gwyn on 9 March 1794) was renumbered 22nd (Light) Dragoons in that year. This 22nd (Light) Dragoons regiment served throughout the Napoleonic Wars, which began in 1803. The regiment served in India, where it remained until 1813. During this period it participated in the British Invasion of Java (1811). The regiment was disbanded in 1820.

On 1 December 1940, the regiment was restored to the Army List. The new 22nd Dragoons was formed from cadres taken from the 4th/7th Royal Dragoon Guards and 5th Royal Inniskilling Dragoon Guards. The cap badge initially assigned to the regiment was simple. Later, its regimental crest, used on the headstones of the regiment's dead, combined the 4th/7th Royal Dragoon Guards' Star of St Patrick with Enniskillen Castle to represent the 5th Inniskilling Dragoon Guards - the 4th/7th and Inniskillings are now amalgamated as the Royal Dragoon Guards and have adopted a cap badge that is very similar to this. The regiment was assigned to 29th Armoured Brigade in 11th Armoured Division, but later was transferred to 30th Armoured Brigade in the same division. This changeover was due to the regimental loyalties of the brigade commanders. In 1942, 30 Armoured Brigade was transferred to 42nd Armoured Division before finally joining 79th Armoured Division in 1943.

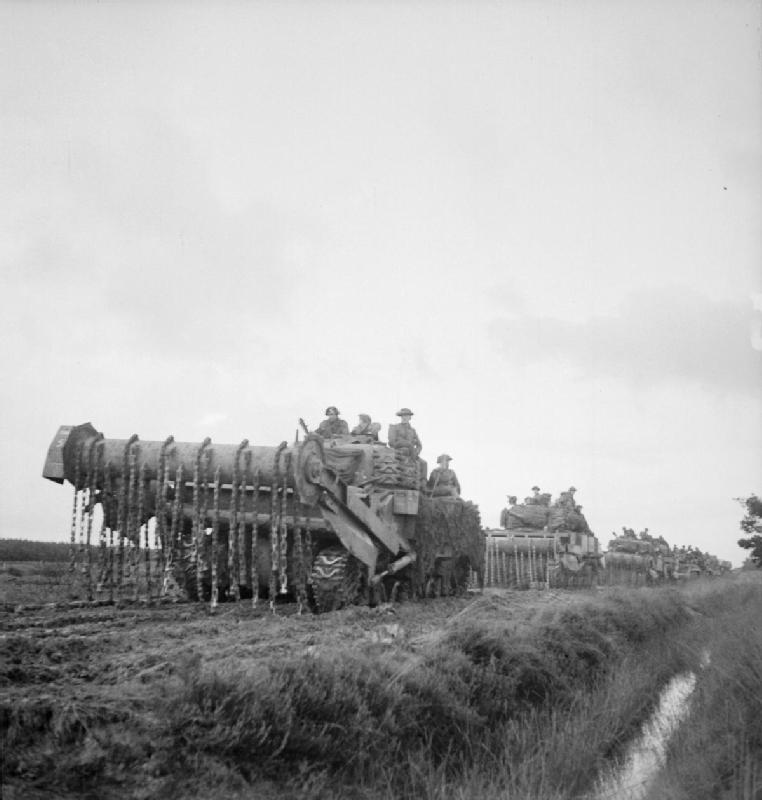
Sherman Crabs of 30th Armoured Brigade, 1944.

All three regiments of the 30th Armoured Brigade were re-equipped with Sherman Crab flail tanks - M4 Sherman tanks modified by attaching a large jib, covered in chains, to the front of the vehicle. The idea was that the tanks would clear a path through a minefield by slowly driving along flogging the ground ahead of them and, hopefully, exploding the mines; to be effective, the tanks had to drive at no more than one and half miles per hour. As with all units within the 79th Armoured Division they were not generally used as entire regiments but allocated as troop or squadron-sized formations for specific tasks in support of organised set piece attacks.

As such, the regiment came ashore in the first wave of the Operation Overlord landings on the morning of 6 June 1944, with A Squadron, reinforced by two troops of C Squadron and supported by two troops of the Westminster Dragoons, landing on Sword Beach and B Squadron landing on Juno Beach. Later in the day, the final two troops of C Squadron landed on Juno, where they remained for several days on beach clearance duties. Once the beaches were cleared, the regiment saw sporadic action in the fighting through Belgium and the Netherlands into Germany, where they were at the end of the war; the regiment was disbanded in Germany on 30 November 1945. The regiment was awarded ten battle honours for operations in the North West Europe Theatre.

One of the Regiment's personnel was Ian Carmichael who later became a well-known actor and who commanded a Troop of B Squadron's Sherman Crabs that landed on Juno Beach on D-Day.

== Battle honours ==
- Second World War: Normandy Landing, Odon, Caen, Falaise, Le Havre, Lower Maas, Venlo Pocket, Reichswald, Rhine, North-West Europe 1944–45
