= Humber scout car =

British armoured scout car

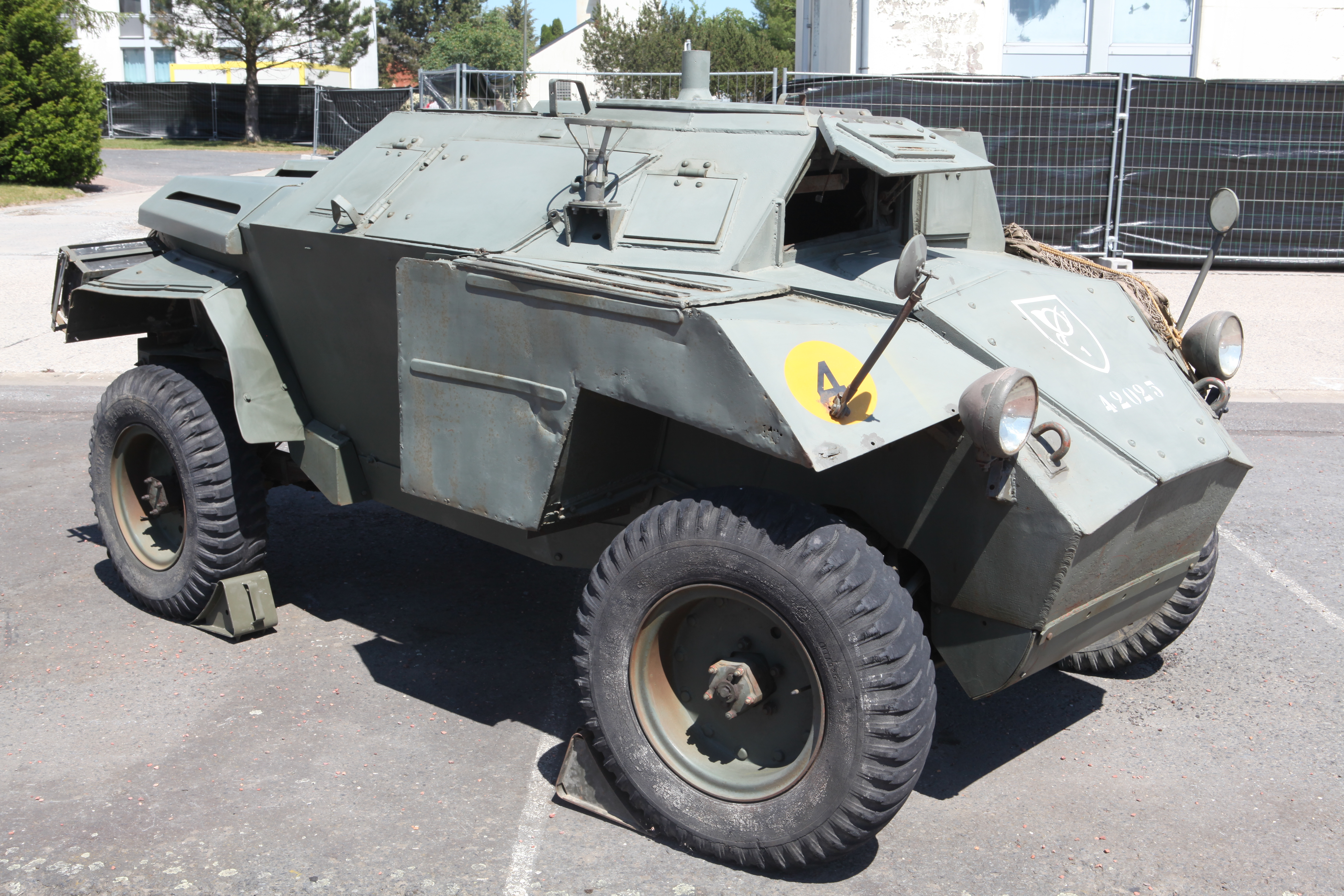
- Type: Armoured scout car

Production history
- Manufacturer: Humber

Specifications
- Mass: 2.4 tonnes (2.4 long tons)
- Length: 3.83 m (12 ft 7 in)
- Width: 1.87 m (6 ft 2 in)
- Height: 2.13 m (7 ft 0 in)
- Crew: 2
- Armour: up to 14 mm (0.55 in)
- Main armament: One or two 0.303 in (7.7 mm) Bren machine guns
- Engine: 6-cyl. petrol 87 hp (65 kW)
- Power/weight: 25.6 hp/tonne
- Suspension: 4 x 4 wheeled
- Operational range: 320 km (200 mi)
- Maximum speed: 100 km/h (62 mph)

The Humber scout car was a British light scout car used in the Second World War. It entered service in 1942 and continued in production until 1945. Designed for reconnaissance, and liaison between armoured units, it provided protection only against light arms fire, so was not a front line vehicle. More importantly it was small and fast and could quickly evade trouble. It became the shape format for the post war Ferret armoured car which began production in 1952.

== History ==
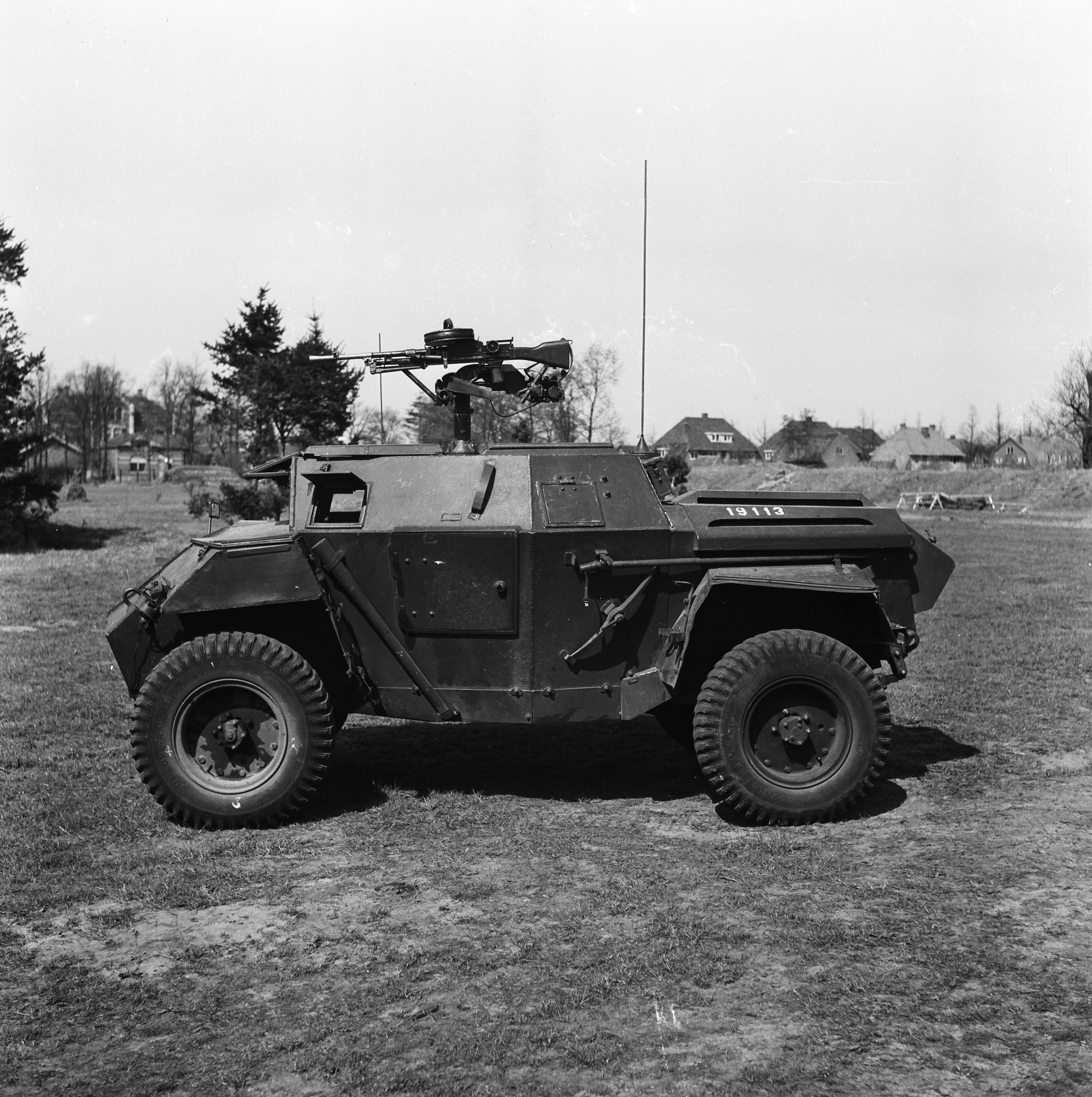
Humber Mk I scout car, side view.

Although at the outbreak of the Second World War the British Army had already selected the Daimler Dingo for production, the need for scout cars could not be met by Daimler alone, so other companies were required to produce similar vehicles. One of these companies was Humber which along with other companies in the Rootes Group was already producing armoured cars and the Humber Light Reconnaissance Car. In 1942 they built a vehicle similar to the Dingo in layout.

To comply with the official requirement to keep the weight down, the Daimler "Dingo" was open top (the Humber had an unarmoured floor).

The vehicle carried a crew of two, with an emergency seat for a third member. It was equipped with a No. 19 radio set. The armament consisted of one Bren light machine gun with a 100-round drum. A second Bren could be added if necessary. This was mounted above the roof, and could be operated from inside the vehicle using a system looking similar to bicycle handlebars, where the "brake" levers fired the triggers of the Brens.

Production of the vehicles continued until 1945. At least 4,298 were ordered and at least 4,102 delivered, 1,698 of them Mk I. They were used by British armoured units (e.g. the 11th Armoured Division and the Guards Armoured Division) for scouting and liaison and were generally considered less capable and reliable than the Dingo. A number of vehicles were given to the Polish II Corps and the 1st Czechoslovak Armoured Brigade. After the war, some European armies used the Humber. The Belgian army used the Mk II in their tank and reconnaissance units until 1951. An unknown number of these vehicles were then handed over to the Belgian police which continued to use the car until 1958.

Most of the vehicles were destroyed in the 1960s when the British Army used them as targets for tank gunnery practice. There are now currently only about 20 known to exist.

== Operators ==
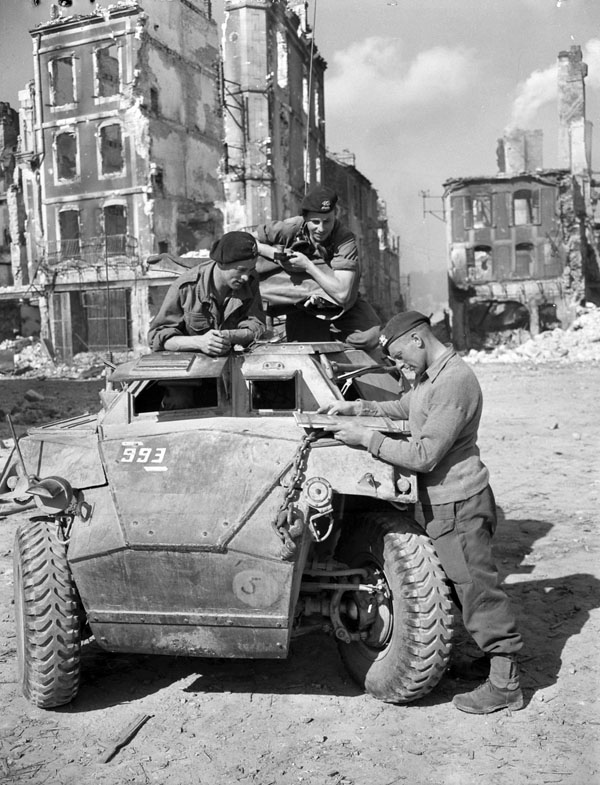
Humber scout car in Falaise, France 1944

- Belgium
- Canada
- Czechoslovakia
- Denmark
- France
- Greece
- Netherlands
- Norway
- Poland
- South Africa
- United Kingdom
- Indonesia - Inherited from the Netherlands.

== Variants ==
- Mk I.
- Mk II - improved transmission and raised armour over steering wheel.
