= 11th Royal Tank Regiment =

Battalion of the British Army

The 11th Royal Tank Regiment (11 RTR) was a battalion of the British Army, part of the Royal Tank Regiment, itself part of the Royal Armoured Corps.

== History ==
The 11th battalion of the Royal Tank Regiment was raised during World War II in January 1941 and designated for the Canal Defence Light (CDL) role in May 1941. The unit trained at Lowther Castle near Penrith, and was based at Brougham Hall, Cumberland. It spent 1942 and 1943 in the Middle East without seeing action, returning to the UK in April 1944. 11 RTR formed part of 79th Armoured Division (a.k.a. Hobart's Funnies), equipped initially with CDL (tactical searchlight) tanks. It landed in Normandy on 12 August 1944, seeing no action until 29 September 1944, when it was ordered to transfer all of its equipment to the 42nd and 49th Royal Tank Regiments, and was retrained to operate the American amphibious LVTs, known by the British Army as the Buffalo. It then participated in Operations Infatuate, the amphibious landing on Walcheren island, and Plunder, the assault crossing of the River Rhine. Prime Minister Winston Churchill was ferried across the Rhine in a Buffalo from 'C' Squadron, 11 RTR. The book "the story of the 79th Armoured Division" created and published by the 79th Armoured Division themselves in 1945, states that Winston Churchill was transported across the Rhine by 'B' Squadron of 11 Royal Tanks.
