= Operation Martlet =

1944 battle in Caen, France during WWII

- Part of the Battle for Caen of the Second World War
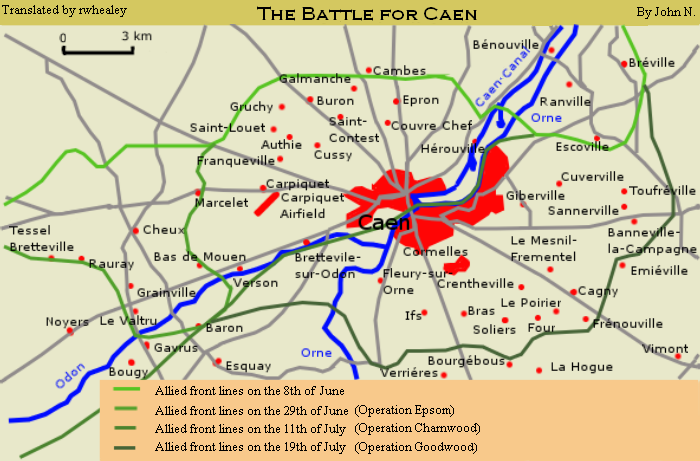
- Battle for Caen: Operation Martlet (left edge of map)
Date	25 June – 1 July 1944
Location	Odon Valley, France 49°09′12″N 0°34′23″W
Result	Allied victory

Belligerents
United Kingdom	Germany

Commanders and leaders
(United Kingdom) Gerard C. Bucknall (United Kingdom) Evelyn Barker	(Nazi Germany) Kurt Meyer (Nazi Germany) Otto Weidinger

Strength
49th (West Riding) Infantry Division; 8th Armoured Brigade	12th SS Panzer Division Hitlerjugend; Kampfgruppe Weidinger of 2nd SS Panzer Division Das Reich; 9th SS-Panzer Division Hohenstaufen

Casualties and losses
c. 772 (incomplete)	Includes German losses during Operation Epsom: 12th SS Panzer Division Hitlerjugend; 1,240; 9th SS-Panzer Division Hohenstaufen; 1,145; Kampfgruppe Weidinger 642 c. 48 tanks

Operation Martlet (also known as Operation Dauntless) was part of a series of British attacks to capture the French town of Caen and its environs from German forces during the Battle of Normandy of World War II begun by the Allies. It was a preliminary operation undertaken on 25 June 1944 by XXX Corps of the British Second Army, to capture Rauray and the area around Noyers. The attack was to protect the right flank of VIII Corps as it began Operation Epsom, an offensive into the Odon Valley west of Caen, on 26 June. The 50th (Northumbrian) Infantry Division and the 49th (West Riding) Infantry Division were to capture Juvigny-sur-Seulles, Vendes and Rauray, to prevent German counter-attacks against VIII Corps from the area of the Rauray Spur and then extend the attack towards Noyers and Aunay-sur-Odon. It was the first time in Normandy that the 49th (West Riding) Division operated as a division.

The attack front was held by the right flank of the Panzer Lehr Division and the left flank of the 12th SS Panzer Division Hitlerjugend, with the support of 60–80 88 mm guns of the III Flak Corps. The attack failed to achieve its objectives by the end of 25 June and the 49th (West Riding) Division continued the operation until 1 July, when the division defeated a counter-attack by Kampfgruppe Weidinger of 2nd SS-Panzer Division Das Reich and the 9th SS-Panzer Division Hohenstaufen, which lost c. 35 tanks and other armoured vehicles. The II SS Panzerkorps, had been intended for a counter-offensive west of Caen towards Bayeux but was so depleted by the losses of operations Martlet and Epsom and the danger of another British offensive near Caen, that it was reduced to the static defence of the Odon valley.

== Background ==
=== Invasion of Normandy ===
The Norman town of Caen was the most important D-Day objective of I Corps of the British Second Army, which was to take Caen and form a front running from Caumont-l'Éventé in the west to the area south-east of Caen, to protect the eastern flank of the First US Army and form a jumping-off point for an advance southwards to capture Falaise. The 3rd Infantry Division landed on Sword Beach on 6 June but was stopped short of Caen by the 21st Panzer Division.

Operation Perch, a pincer attack to encircle Caen, was begun by I Corps and XXX Corps the following day. I Corps attacked southwards out of the bridgehead on the east bank of the Orne and was halted by the 21st Panzer Division after advancing a short distance; the attack by XXX Corps was held up west of Caen, north of Tilly-sur-Seulles, by the Panzer Lehr Division. The 7th Armoured Division side-stepped westwards and attacked through a gap on the right flank opened by the 50th (Northumbrian) Infantry Division and the 1st US Infantry Division, capturing the town of Villers-Bocage. German forces counter-attacked immediately and the Battle of Villers-Bocage ended in a costly stalemate. The vanguard of the 7th Armoured Division withdrew from the town and by 17 June, the Panzer Lehr Division had also been forced back and XXX Corps had taken Tilly-sur-Seulles.

=== Battle for Caen ===
Advance of Allied forces, 9–13 June

Allied offensive operations were postponed when a severe storm hit the English Channel on 19 June, which delayed the Allied build-up for three days and left them three divisional disembarkations behind schedule. Operation Dreadnought, an attack from the Orne bridgehead by VIII Corps to outflank Caen from the east, was cancelled. The poor weather grounded most Allied aircraft until 23 June, allowing the Germans to receive reinforcements relatively undisturbed and the equivalent of two German divisions, artillery and mortar units reached Normandy. Defensive positions were strengthened with minefields and about seventy 88 mm anti-tank guns were sited in hedgerows and woods on the approaches to Caen. On 23 June, the 51st (Highland) Infantry Division attacked Ste Honorine la Chardonnerette before dawn, captured the village and then repulsed a counter-attack, destroying thirteen German tanks. Further west, VIII Corps, which had recently arrived from England, was moved into line between XXX Corps and I Corps, to the west of Caen. Planning for an attack by VIII Corps on 26 June had begun and a preliminary attack by XXX Corps to capture high ground in the area west of VIII Corps was arranged for 25 June.

== Prelude ==
=== Plan ===
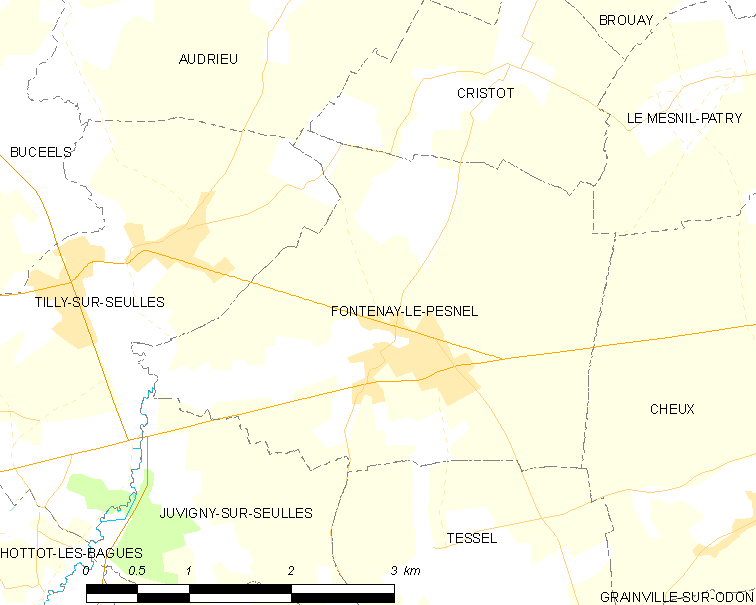
Fontenay-le-Pesnel in the 49th Division area (Map commune FR insee code 14278)

Operation Epsom, the VIII Corps attack due on 26 June, was vulnerable to a German counter-attack from the Rauray Spur, an area of high ground to the west, which overlooked the line of advance of 15th (Scottish) Infantry Division around the village of Cheux. On 25 June, XXX Corps was to conduct Operation Martlet, seizing the Noyers area to deprive the Germans of observation eastwards and the opportunity to counter-attack VIII Corps from the high ground. When the flank of VIII Corps had been secured, XXX Corps was to attack southwards towards Noyers and Aunay-sur-Odon.

The 49th Division was to reach the first objective ("Barracuda") on the road between Juvigny and Fontenay, with three battalions and then advance 1,000 yd (910 m) south to the second objective ("Walrus") at Tessel Wood and the farm at St. Nicholas, with two fresh battalions. The division was then to advance to the final objective ("Albacore") at Rauray village and the Rauray Spur, to establish a line from Rauray to Vendes and Juvigny-sur-Seulles (Juvigny), to secure the right flank of the 15th (Scottish) Infantry Division.

The 49th Division planned to advance on a two-brigade front, with the 146th Infantry Brigade on the right and the 147th Infantry Brigade on the left, to its first phase objective at Fontenay and then to Rauray. The 8th Armoured Brigade and the 70th Infantry Brigade were held back in support; an extra field artillery regiment and a regiment of M10 tank destroyers were added to the divisional artillery and for the first day, five VIII Corps field artillery regiments and parts of two anti-aircraft brigades operating as ground artillery were made available "on call". On the 50th Division front, a firm base was to be maintained, ready to follow up a German withdrawal.

=== German defences ===
Opposite XXX Corps, the German front was held by the Panzer Lehr Division and the left flank of the 12th SS Panzer Division Hitlerjugend, which held a 12 km (7.5 mi) front from Epron north of Caen westwards to Fontenay. The divisions were supported by 60–80 88 mm guns of the III Flakkorps, from Saint-André-sur-Orne to Aunay-sur-Odon, which had instructions to engage Allied tanks at ranges greater than 2,000 m (2,200 yd). South of the 49th Division, the German defences were held by the III Battalion, 26th SS Panzer Grenadier Regiment and tanks from the 12th SS Panzer Regiment from the 12th SS Panzer Division. Both regiments were dug in behind extensive minefields in well-camouflaged positions but had been in action since the invasion and were tired. By 24 June, the 12th SS Panzer Division had suffered c. 2,550 casualties (about half of its infantry), had only c. 58 operational Panzer IV tanks, c. 44 operational Panthers and an unknown number of the ten Jagdpanzer IV tank destroyers in the division on 6 June. (Note: Zetterling published his research on German units and casualties in Normandy in book form in 2000 and also on the web in 2001, from which all data cited to Zetterling are taken.) The Panzer Lehr Division had c. 33 operational Panzer IVs, c. 30 Panthers and a number of the forty Jagdpanzer IV and Sturmgeschütz III assault guns in the division on 1 June. Since the invasion the division had suffered c. 2,300 casualties, mostly from its infantry and was due to be relieved to refit, as soon as the 276th Division arrived from Belgium.

== Battle ==
Topography of the area west of Caen

=== 25 June ===
At 4:15 a.m. on the morning of 25 June, Operation Martlet commenced with a mass artillery bombardment, just ahead of the start line of the 49th Division. At 5:00 a.m. the bombardment began to creep forward and the infantry advanced downhill through cornfields. A thick ground mist had developed, reducing visibility to 5 yd (4.6 m) in places. In the 146th Infantry Brigade area on the right flank, the 4th Lincolns and tanks of the 24th Lancers advanced and after an hour, their field radios became ineffective and the infantry struggled to keep direction, shouting to identify themselves as they advanced through the mist, smoke and mortar bombs. A group of German half-tracks were destroyed by hand grenades and a German officer was shot while trying to signal with a bugle, as the battalion reached "Barracuda". As the sun rose, visibility increased to 60 yd (55 m) and a hot and sunny day began. On the left of 146th Brigade, the Hallamshire Battalion took compass bearings every few yards and reached "Barracuda" on the Fontenay–Tessel-Bretteville road, from where it came under fire from tanks of the 8th Company of II Battalion, 12th SS Panzer Regiment and two companies of III Battalion, 26th SS Panzergrenadier Regiment.

The Hallamshires knocked out two German tanks with 6-pounder anti-tank guns and then advanced laterally in both directions along the road, westwards to le Pont de Juvigny (le Pont) and eastwards to Fontenay, through shell and mortar fire. At noon the Tyneside Scottish moved up to le Haut d'Audrieu to consolidate the area and the 1/4th King's Own Yorkshire Light Infantry advanced with the 24th Lancers through the 4th Lincolns, from the hamlet of Bas de Fontenay (Lower Fontenay), west of Fontenay village along the Juvigny road, to objective "Walrus" at Tessel Wood on the spur north of Vendes. The infantry advanced uphill and had made 100 yd (91 m) in four minutes behind a dense creeping bombardment, when a German Nebelwerfer bombardment began, slowing the advance and causing many casualties. The battalion eventually advanced 1 mi (1.6 km) to the edge of the wood. A counter-attack was repulsed and the 24th Lancers knocked out two German tanks.

On the left flank, in the 147th Infantry Brigade area, the 11th Royal Scots Fusiliers advancing towards "Barracuda" on the northern fringe of Fontenay, disappeared into the mist and immediately had many casualties. Soldiers held on to each other to maintain direction and when the sun rose, snipers and machine-gunners in their path began to inflict more losses. The survivors reached Fontenay and began to fight through the village hand-to-hand; they then came under fire from Parc de Boislonde to the north-east and were unable to get beyond the road to Tilly. At 8:20 p.m. the 1/7th Duke of Wellington's Regiment (1/7th Dukes) advanced through the remnants of the 11th RSF and continued the attack on the village. The III Battalion, 26th SS Panzer Grenadier Regiment, which had been reinforced by troops sent from Caen by the 21st Panzer Division and from Vendes by the Panzer Lehr Division, held on to the woods and the east end of the village. Hand-to-hand fighting went on in the village all night.

By nightfall, the 49th Division had established a line roughly south-west from Fontenay, about 1 mi (1.6 km) short of Rauray and the high ground which had observation over the VIII Corps area. Cloud cover began to increase as plans were made for the Tyneside Scottish to attack Rauray at dawn. On the western flank of XXX Corps, the 50th Division had managed only to advance a short distance south of Tilly-sur-Seulles. German reserves behind the front opposite VIII Corps, had been moved west to reinforce the defenders attacked by XXX Corps, which was believed by the Germans to be the main axis of the British offensive. The weekly situation report by Army Group B for 19–26 June, recorded that a gap 5 km (3.1 mi) wide and 2 km (1.2 mi) deep had been forced at the junction of the defences of the Panzer Lehr and 12th SS Panzer divisions.

=== 26 June ===
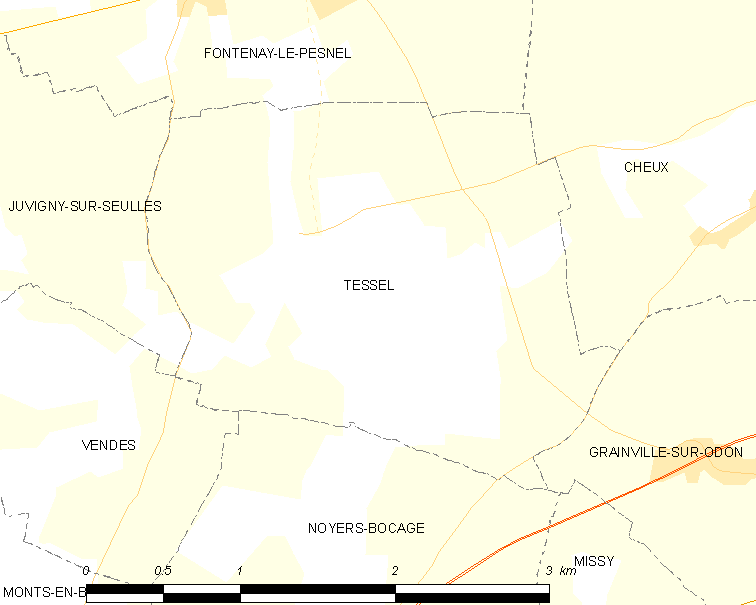
Tessel-Bretteville area (Map commune FR insee code 14684)

The 70th Infantry and 8th Armoured brigades prepared to advance south of Fontenay at 6:50 a.m., with Operation Epsom due to begin further west at 7:30 a.m. On the left flank of the 49th Division, the 7th Dukes and the Sherwood Rangers Yeomanry attacked towards "Walrus" at 9:30 a.m., with the first objective being St. Nicholas farm, about 0.5 mi (0.8 km) away. The German garrison and hidden tanks repulsed the attack until 3:50 p.m., when a second attempt after a twenty-minute artillery barrage, took the farm and ground beyond. The Yeomanry tanks then advanced to the crossroads north of Rauray and the 11th DLI arrived at 9:00 p.m. to consolidate the position. A patrol lurked forward to the edge of the village for a night attack but found that despite a fighter-bomber attack with rockets during the day, the village was full of German infantry and the woods nearby were held by tanks.

In the centre, the 1st Tyneside Scottish and the 4/7th Royal Dragoon Guards prepared to attack la Grande Ferme, with the right flank guarded by the 24th Lancers and the 12th (Motorised) Battalion, King's Royal Rifle Corps (12th KRRC) of the 8th Armoured Brigade, making an advance towards Tessel-Bretteville. The attack began with less artillery support, as much of the extra artillery made available on 25 June, reverted to the support of VIII Corps. German return fire from tanks and concealed machine-guns forced the infantry under the cover of banks, which had been ranged by Nebelwerfers and were immediately bombarded. The rockets hit trees and hedges nearby and sent lethal wood splinters everywhere. Beyond le Bordel Rau stream, four dug-in tanks held up the attack, as well as a company of infantry in la Grande Ferme and infantry reinforcements from the 21st Panzer Division, dug in around Tessel Wood. The 12th KRRC crossed le Bordel Rau stream at midday but was pinned down beyond and six Dragoon Guard tanks were knocked out attacking the farm. At 4:00 p.m., the infantry were withdrawn 3 mi (4.8 km) to le Haut d'Audrieu, except for a small party which reached the farm.

The 12th KRRC, mounted mainly in M3 Half-tracks and Universal Carriers, attacked towards Tessel-Bretteville as the Shermans of the 24th Lancers moved past the east side of Tessel Wood. The British were engaged by the tanks at la Grande Ferme and others near Tessel-Bretteville. Two Panthers met the leading squadron of the Lancers, one tank each being hit and set on fire. The advance was limited by the bocage and sunken lanes but reached le Bordel Rau stream. The attackers then reached the west end of the village, before retiring to Tessel Wood under a smoke screen, due to the number of tank and other vehicle losses. During the night, two companies from II Battalion, 192nd Panzer Grenadier Regiment of the 21st Panzer Division, came up to bolster the defences of the Panzer Lehr Division near Vendes, which remained in German hands for the duration of the operation. The Panzer Lehr Division had briefly engaged elements of 146th Brigade but most of it remained concentrated against the 50th Division on the right flank of the 49th Division.

=== 27 June ===
At 7:00 a.m., Yeomanry tanks and a patrol from the 11th DLI began to probe into Rauray against the III Battalion, 26th SS Panzergrenadier Regiment. Flanking fire from tanks and 88 mm guns knocked out several Yeomanry tanks and forced the rest to withdraw. A platoon of the DLI fought their way into the village centre but the rest of the battalion was bombarded by mortar fire, directed by a concealed observer. After an artillery bombardment at 11:00 a.m., the DLI fixed bayonets and advanced in line abreast through machine-gun and sniper fire, which caused many casualties and led to a truce being arranged at noon, for both sides to recover wounded. The attack resumed at 2:00 p.m. and by 4:00 p.m. the village had been captured; several German snipers were found to have been camouflaged and tied to trees. To the west of Tessel-Bretteville, the Hallamshires attacked towards Vendes from Tessel Wood but made little progress and preparations were made to attack Brettevillette the next day.

=== 28 June ===
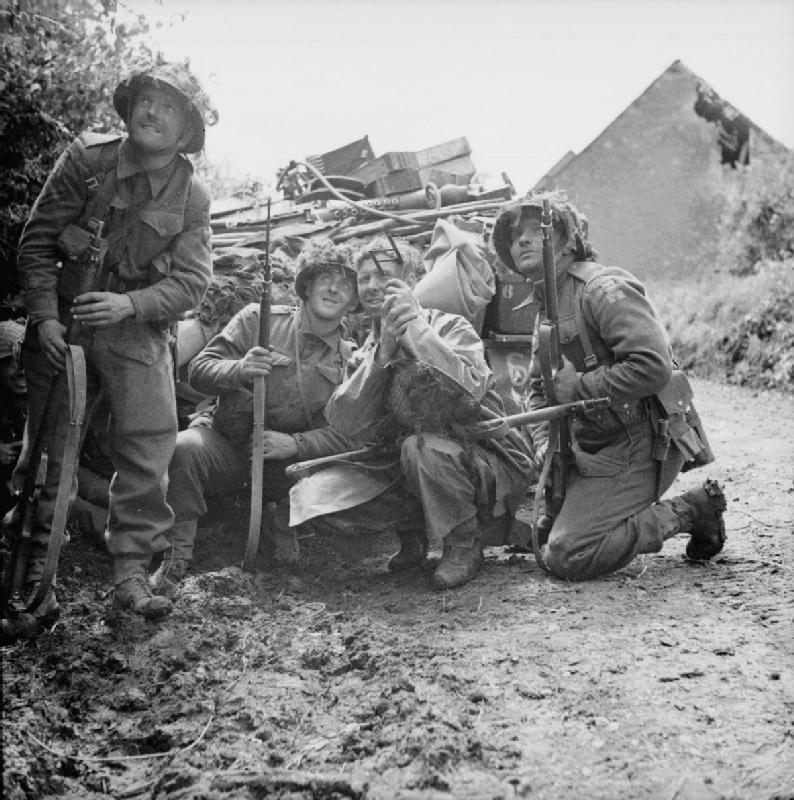
Men of the 2nd Kensington Regiment, 49th (West Riding) Division, attempt to spot a sniper in Rauray, 28 June 1944

At 6:50 a.m. a barrage by four field artillery regiments and the guns of an Army Group Royal Artillery (AGRA) began and on the left flank, the attack by the 10th DLI and the 4/7th Dragoon Guards resumed through the positions of the 11th DLI in Rauray, towards the high ground south of the village, where the fighting went on all day. At 7:00 a.m. the 1st Tyneside Scottish in the centre, advanced through the bocage close to the creeping barrage, towards the objective of Brettevillette south-west of Rauray. The battalion reached the first objective "Jock" (Tessel-Bretteville) after forty minutes, where two companies consolidated and two pushed on towards the final objective "Jones" (Brettevillette) behind another creeping barrage. German machine-gun fire became intense and the rear of the battalion was bombarded by artillery and mortars but the advance continued and by 2:30 p.m. the battalion had entered the village.

After thirty minutes the British were counter-attacked by Kampfgruppe Weidinger of the 2nd SS Panzer Division Das Reich, which had arrived the day before from the area south of St. Lô and relieved the 12th SS Panzer Division west of Rauray. With a Panther company of the 2nd Panzer Division, the kampfgruppe began several hours of mutually costly counter-attacks as the Tyneside Scottish tried to consolidate their positions in the village. The battalion was withdrawn to Tessel-Bretteville by 9:00 p.m., with an advanced company dug in 400 yd (370 m) north of Brettevillette. By recovering the village and holding Queudeville to the south, Kampfgruppe Weidinger had kept open a route from Noyers-Bocage for a forthcoming counter-offensive by the II SS Panzer Corps against the VIII Corps salient to the east.

=== 29–30 June ===
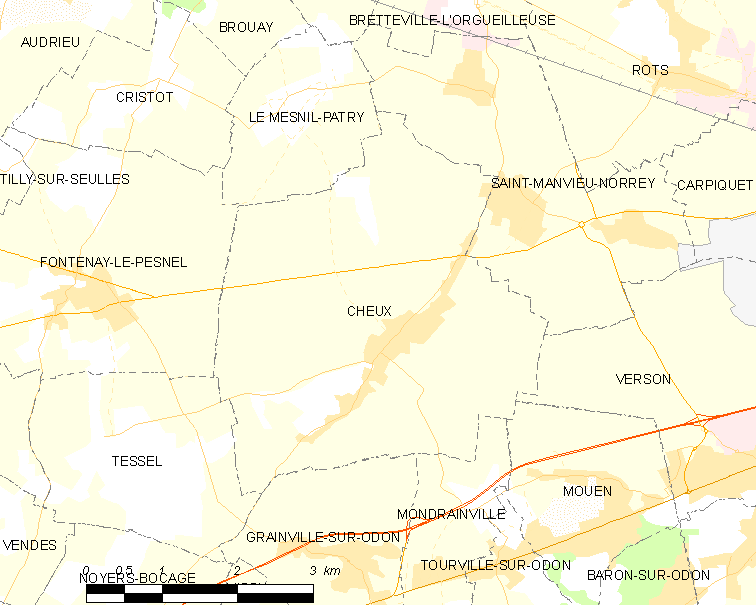
Vendes–Cheux area, (Map commune FR insee code 14157)

The weather on the morning of 29 June was bright and clear and Allied aircraft conducted many ground attack sorties and reconnaissance flights, which found that many German reinforcements were heading for the Odon area. The German counter-offensive by the II SS Panzerkorps, took place south of the 49th Division, either side of the Odon river between Queudeville and Évrecy, against the VIII Corps salient. XXX Corps provided artillery support to VIII Corps and prepared to defend the ground around Rauray. The 1st Tyneside Scottish found that any movement attracted massed mortar fire from Kampfgruppe Weidinger and a tank periodically harassed the company dug in north of the village. The company was withdrawn to avoid an artillery barrage, preparatory to an attack on the village by the 11th DLI but as soon as the move was spotted, a Nebelwerfer bombardment began and caused many casualties. The battalion was relieved at 6:00 a.m. on 30 June, by the 4th Battalion The Lincolnshire Regiment (4th Lincolns). Nebelwerfer and artillery fire fell on the 10th DLI and 4/7th Dragoon Guards south of Rauray during the day, where several tanks were lost while reconnoitring the forward slope. On 30 June, the two Durham battalions were relieved at Rauray by the Tyneside Scottish, which sent patrols forward in the evening.

The Tyneside Scottish selected as a tank killing ground, an area east and south-east of ring contour 110, in front of A and B companies, which had the only good field of observation and dug in four 6-pounder anti-tank guns by the evening. Patrols were sent forward but discovered little because of the poor view in the bocage. The 11th RSF held the right flank near Juvigny, in touch with the 50th Division to the west and the 1/4th KOYLI to the east, who were at the western edge of Tessel Wood. The Hallamshires held the south-west corner of the wood, a little to the north of Vendes and linked with the 4th Lincolns at Tessel-Bretteville. The 11th DLI were dug in near Rauray and linked with the Tyneside Scottish on the high ground at ring contour 110. Across the divisional and corps boundary to the east, along the road to le Haut du Bosq, the 6th King's Own Scottish Borderers (6th KOSB) of the 15th (Scottish) Division were dug in on the south side of the road, an obvious avenue of attack against VIII Corps. Only the units near ring contour 110 had a relatively unhampered view, the other battalions being hemmed in by banks, hedgerows and trees. The three 49th Division artillery regiments, tanks of the 24th Lancers, anti-tank guns of the 217th Anti-tank Regiment RA, two dummy 6-pounder anti-tank guns and the Vickers machine-guns of the 2nd Kensingtons, were made ready to support of the infantry. Wireless intelligence, gleaned from the II SS Panzerkorps, led to Bomber Command dropping 1,300 long tons (1,300 t) of bombs during the evening on suspected German tank concentrations at Villers-Bocage which, along with a naval and artillery bombardment, obliterated the town in twelve minutes.

=== German counter-attack, 1 July ===
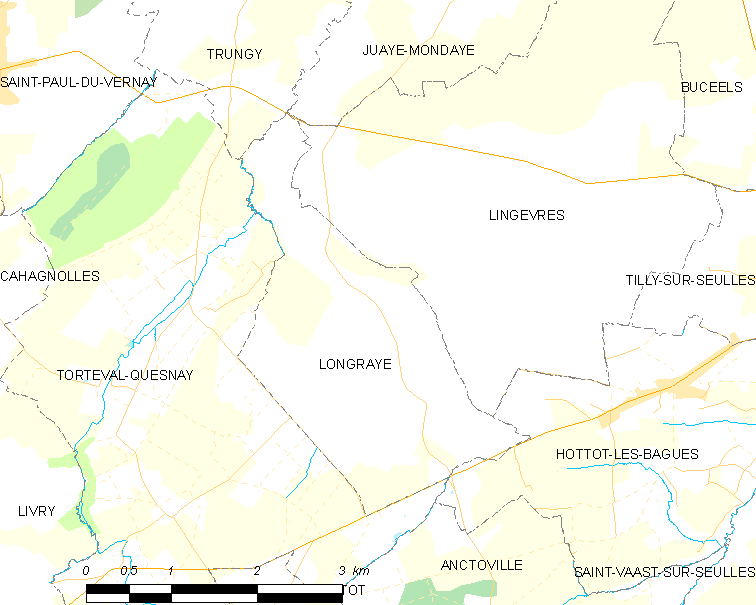
Longraye, in the 50th Division area (Map commune FR insee code 14376)

During the night of 30 June/1 July much activity and the sound of tracked vehicles was heard behind the German front by patrols. The 50th Division had continued its attacks south-west of Tilly-la-Campagne and captured Hottot-les-Bagues twice, before losing it to counter-attacks; Longraye had been captured 4 mi (6.4 km) to the west. In the morning the 56th Brigade, on the right flank of the 50th Division, took over the line north of Bois de Saint Germain and Crauville, then began vigorous patrolling against the 277th Infantry Division and the tanks of the 2nd Panzer Division, ready for an attack on the wood on 8 July. The Germans had planned a big night attack against the VIII Corps salient for 3:00 a.m. on 1 July by Kampfgruppe Weidinger and the 9th SS Panzer Division but the commander of the division, SS-Obersturmbannfuhrer Woith, was wounded by artillery fire and failed to pass on the attack order in time. It was also found that the tanks of the 9th SS Panzer Regiment had retired after dark and the attack was postponed until 6:00 a.m.

At midnight a bombardment by mortars and artillery began on the British positions; patrols reported that tanks could be heard south of Brettevillette and soon after, the Tyneside Scottish were ordered to stand to, ready for sunrise at 5:01 a.m. At 6:00 a.m. Kampfgruppe Weidinger, with the 19th and 20th SS Panzergrenadier regiments and the 9th SS Panzer Regiment from the 9th SS Panzer Division, began to advance through a smoke screen towards Ferme des Cigognes, south of le Haut du Bosq on the Cheux road. Groups of five tanks advanced accompanied by Panzergrenadiers, fired on the British infantry as the troops deployed and then moved forward. Other groups advanced on an arc from east to north-east, into the defences of the 6th KOSB and the 4th Lincolns from Rauray to Tessel-Bretteville. The 24th Lancers and the divisional artillery opened fire German tank-infantry groups as they emerged from the smoke screen at about 6:45 a.m.

German tactics reflected the vulnerability of tanks and infantry once they emerged from the bocage,

V. cleverly handled in small numbers with or without inf. They lie up in or infiltrated into posns from which they can engage our defensive posns by fire.

against which the British replied with anti-tank fire from camouflaged positions, although to gain a field of fire the guns were dug in close to hedgerows, which disclosed the approximate position of the guns. German fire on the anti-tank positions increased in accuracy during the engagement and they were destroyed one-by-one. The German artillery alternated HE and smoke bombardments so that the tanks could emerge from the smoke-screen, engage suspected British positions and then move on supported by infantry. The British field artillery then forced the German tanks to retire and the infantry to get under cover, while the German artillery resumed the HE bombardment; each German thrust inflicted casualties on the British and went further forward. German snipers and parties of machine-gunners infiltrated the British outpost line around Rauray and the positions of the Tyneside Scottish.

By 11:00 a.m. the British outpost line had been overrun on both sides of the track. A line of 17-pounder anti-tank guns of 344 Antitank Battery RA near le Haut-du-Bosq, became the front line despite the restricted view. When A Company of the Tyneside Scottish was forced back into the 6th KOSB area, German tanks and Panzergrenadiers swung north, 300 yd (270 m) behind B Company, where they were engaged by tanks of the 24th Lancers. Six German tanks were knocked out and the advance was stopped; artillery was called for around Brettevillette. (Note: One witness claimed that during one of the German attacks, British prisoners were driven before the SS Panzergrenadiers (A. P. Whitehead).)

Much of the artillery support had responded to calls by artillery observers for Defensive Fire task 109 (DF109) and had fallen in the area in front of the Tyneside Scottish and the KOSB. During the afternoon, an artillery observer in the Belleval Château saw German tanks forming up in a triangular wood and called for "DF109 south-west 400". The call was revised to a "Mike Target" (to be engaged by all 24 guns of the field regiment), then revised to an "Uncle target" (bombardment by the 72 guns of all three divisional field artillery regiments) and revised again to a "Victor Target", (a bombardment including all of the medium and heavy guns of VIII Corps). A similar call was made on the guns of XXX Corps and a huge bombardment fell on the German staging area. Later in the day British troops re-occupied the outpost line, supported by Churchill Crocodile flame-throwers, which flamed hedgerows and forced the German infantry into the open, many of whom ran back rather than attempt to surrender and were shot down. (Note: VIII Corps had 240 field, 16 medium and 16 heavy guns, XXX Corps had 96 field, 64 medium and 16 heavy guns.) On the front of the 10th DLI, 11th DLI and the 4th Lincolns, German infantry encroached on defensive positions but were pushed out by counter-attacks, which were costly for both sides. C Squadron of the Sherwood Rangers lost two tanks in support of the 10th DLI and the 55th Anti-Tank Regiment RA, which was deployed behind the DLI battalions, knocked out six Panthers.

== Aftermath ==
=== Analysis ===
In 2003, Terry Copp wrote that the German counter-attack against the ground captured by XXX Corps was a costly failure and that the Germans holding the remaining positions on the Rauray Spur were reduced to passive defence. German armoured units had encountered the same problems of lack of observation and room for manoeuvre as the Allies. A shortage of infantry and the effect of Allied artillery fire made co-operation much more difficult and made direct command almost impossible. Operation Martlet had achieved its purpose in distracting and inflicting attrition on the German forces opposite. Ian Daglish wrote in 2007, that although XXX Corps had failed to reach its objective, German attention was diverted from the area of Operation Epsom and that tanks in the area had been sent westwards to counter-attack the gap forced by the 49th Division, leaving them out of position when the main attack by VIII Corps began.

In a report on the battle of 1 July written the same day, Lieutenant-Colonel A. E. Warhurst called the German repulse a severe defeat, in which c. 50 tanks had been committed. Warhurst estimated that c. 35 German tanks had been knocked out, ten to the Tyneside Scottish, eleven to the 24th Lancers, six to the 217th Battery, 55th Anti-tank Regiment and five to a barrage from the medium artillery; five Shermans were lost by the 24th Lancers. Each of the mortars of the Tyneside Irish fired c. 600 bombs and the artillery inflicted many losses on the Germans because the British were able to maintain excellent signal communications all day, while German radio operators had to be stationed at a distance from their headquarters, due to the speed with which British wireless listening posts plotted their positions and directed artillery fire onto them.

In 2013, John Buckley wrote that the German defence against Martlet had been poorly co-ordinated and was costly against the firepower at the disposal of the British, a tactical phenomenon encountered by the Germans all through the Normandy campaign. Martlet had succeeded in diverting German forces from Operation Epsom but the German success in holding Rauray Ridge was a British failure,

The view would make the Panzer men who have found their way painfully through the broken terrain up to here heave a sigh of relief.

which left the Germans in a commanding position, even when Rauray was captured.

=== Casualties ===
In June, the assembly of the 2nd SS Panzer Division in Normandy was incomplete; on 1 July, the division had an establishment of 17,283 men but only 11,195 men at the battlefront. Kampfgruppe Weidinger and the 9th SS Panzer Division defended the Rauray Spur and participated in the counter-offensive against Operation Epsom. (Note: Kampfgruppe Weidinger consisted of I Battalion, 3rd SS Panzer Grenadier Regiment, I Battalion, 4th SS Panzer Grenadier Regiment and the 13th, 14th, 15th and 16th companies, 4th SS Panzer Grenadier Regiment.) The kampfgruppe lost (until 1 July inclusive) 108 men killed, 408 wounded and 126 men missing. The 9th SS Panzer Division had 1,145 casualties until 1 July (inclusive) and the number of operational Panzer IV fell from 41 to 9 in June and rose to ten on 2 July, the number Panthers fell from 27 to 19 between 30 June and 2 July; the number of StuG III fell from 38 to 22 in June and to 19 on 2 July. The left flank units and reinforcements from the 12th SS Panzer Division were engaged against XXX Corps and from 24 June to 11 July, the division lost c. 2,935 men, 1,240 casualties in the three days to 1 July inclusive. From 24 June to 2 July, the number of operational tanks fell from 58 to 32 Panzer IV, 44 to 24 Panthers and an unknown number of Jagdpanzer IV.

The Panzer Lehr Division was slowly relieved by the 276th Infantry Division from 26 June to 5 July and suffered 2,972 casualties in June. From 24 to 26 June the number of operational Panzer IV fell from 33 to 27, Panthers from 30 to 26; the number of operational Jagdpanzer IV and StuG III is unknown. By 1 July, availability had recovered to 36 Panzer IV, 32 Panthers, 28 Jagdpanzer IV and StuG III. The 21st Panzer Division lost 254 infantry from 24 to 30 June and another 557 men by 6 July. From 21 June to 1 July, the number of operational Panzer IV fell from 76 to 61, although it is not known which losses occurred in action against XXX Corps during Operation Martlet. The number of operational Tiger tanks available to the 101st schwere SS-Panzer Abteilung fell from 15 to 11 between 16 June and 1 July and from 11 to none by 4 July. The 49th (West Riding) Division casualties were 400 Tyneside Scottish, c. 200 11th DLI, 150 10th DLI and 22 killed in the 4th Lincolns.

=== Subsequent operations ===
The 49th Division held the line around Rauray for almost a month, except for a diversionary attack around Juvigny during the Second Battle of the Odon. On 30 July, the division was transferred from XXX Corps to I Corps and took post in the bridgehead east of the River Orne, from where it advanced to the Seine. The 12th SS-Panzer Division, severely depleted by the Epsom battles, continued fighting against further British offensives at Carpiquet airfield (Operation Windsor), Caen (Operation Charnwood) and Operation Goodwood. It settled in a position south-east of Caen in mid-July, from where it was gradually forced back by the later Anglo-Canadian offensives. The 9th SS-Panzer Division Hohenstaufen remained in the Odon Valley, holding Hill 112 against the 43rd (Wessex) Infantry Division during Operation Jupiter. It too was eventually pushed back into the Falaise Pocket.
