= Godard family disappearance =

Disappearance of French doctor Yves Godard and his family

The French doctor Yves Godard, his second wife and their two children disappeared in September 1999. Clues to the mystery were gradually discovered: traces of blood were found in the family home near Juvigny-sur-Seulles in Calvados, Lower Normandy. It was established that Godard and his two children departed on a sailing boat rented in Saint-Malo, Brittany, a few days before the discovery of the blood. During the course of the next few years, various objects were found on the north coast of Brittany or at sea: a lifeboat, identity papers, credit cards, the skull of one of the Godard children, and finally the bones of Godard himself. The case was closed on 14 September 2012.

== Timeline of events ==
=== Disappearance of the Godard family ===
On 30 August 1999, Yves Godard, a 44-year-old doctor and acupuncturist, saw his patients for the last time at his practice in Caen, Calvados, Lower Normandy, France. The following day, Godard cancelled his consultations, put his affairs in order at his practice and took his children fishing in ponds in Planquery, sixteen kilometres (ten miles) west of Juvigny. On 1 September, he sailed a Jeanneau Sun Odyssey 30 boat, the Nick, from Pontoon E at the port of Saint-Malo. Godard's children were also on board: Camille (6) and Marius (4). His wife, Marie-France, was not on the boat with them. Godard told the owner of Nick that he wanted to go on a cruise as far as Perros-Guirec, returning on 5 September. He bought cleaning products and floor cloths in Saint-Malo before setting sail, and left them in his Volkswagen Camper van, which he had parked at the port.

On 2 September, French customs officers inspected Nick between Cap d'Erquy and Cap Fréhel. It was a routine inspection, and the officers noticed one of the children sleeping inside the boat. Nick proceeded on its voyage without using the motor once the wind picked up. One of the customs officers was intrigued by Godard's behaviour and checked his story with the boat owner in Saint-Malo.

After the inspection, Godard's boat seems to have remained for a few days near the Bay of Bréhec, between Plouha and Plouézec. Several witnesses in Bréhec saw Nick between 2 and 5 September. Among them was a waffle vendor at the small port, who formally testified that Godard and his children came to buy waffles from her on 3 September. The next day, Nick was spotted by a pair of walkers near the Pointe de Minard in Plouézec, apparently abandoned.

Nick's small inflatable dinghy was recovered by a fishing boat on 5 September, the day on which the boat was supposed to return to Saint-Malo. The dinghy appeared to have been abandoned thirty nautical miles (34.5 land miles, 55.5 kilometres) from the Île de Batz in the Finistère département. In the dinghy were a jacket and a cheque book in Godard's name. Intrigued, the Maritime Gendarmerie in Roscoff opened an investigation into the disappearance. Godard had still not returned to Saint-Malo by 7 September, where investigators found significant traces of blood and doses of morphine in his van.

This discovery forced the investigation to take on more urgency. On 8 September, investigators searched the Godard family home in Juvigny, where they again found significant traces of blood in the bathroom, the living room and the parents' bedroom. On 10 September, a judicial murder investigation was opened, with Godard considered the prime suspect and being made the subject of an international arrest warrant. The investigation was led by Judge Gérard Zaug at the court of Saint-Malo. On 16 September, the blood found in the van was identified as being that of Marie-France Godard, whom no one had seen since 31 August.

=== Items found since September 1999 ===
On 16 September, eleven days after the dinghy was discovered, amateur sailors off the coast of the Channel Islands of Guernsey and Alderney discovered a life jacket belonging to Nick. A week later, on 23 September, the inflatable survival raft of Godard's boat was recovered half-deflated on a beach at Lyme Bay in Dorset, England. Unusually, the raft's canvas canopy had been cut off and was missing.

Although French investigators were leaning towards the theory that Godard had murdered his wife and then fled, these latest discoveries brought chaos into the investigation. According to experts at the French Naval Hydrographic and Oceanographic Service, it was impossible for these items to have been found at these locations as a result of ocean currents alone: they had to have been scattered deliberately. Furthermore, the dinghy's emergency inflation device had been detached. According to the manufacturer, the dinghy could only have remained inflated for 72 hours after this device was removed.

On 16 January 2000, four months after the disappearance of the Godard family, a canvas bag came up in a fisherman's trawling net off the coast of the Île de Batz. It contained numerous personal effects belonging to all the members of the family: clothes, driving licences, insurance documents, cheque books, the entire contents of Marie-France Godard's handbag, binoculars and a hammer.

On 6 June 2000, a sea-shell harvester's boat cast its nets along the bed of Saint-Brieuc Bay, off the coast of Erquy. In the middle of the night, the dredger brought up a fragment of a human skull, which the fisherman threw back into the water. Four hours later, another skull came up, which the fisherman kept. DNA analysis revealed that it was the skull of Camille, Godard's daughter. Scientific analysts at IFREMER concluded that the skull had been at its location since at least February 2000. This seemed to corroborate the theory that Nick somehow sank, claiming the lives of its three passengers. The area in which Camille's skull was found – which is close to where Nick was inspected by customs officers on 2 September 1999 – was scoured by a minehunter and the French Navy, but no trace of the boat was found.

The investigation took on a new dimension when Godard's business card was found on Sunday 11 February 2001 by a walker on a beach on the Ébihans archipelago, off the coast of Saint-Jacut-de-la-Mer. On 22 February, a bank card bearing Godard's name was found on the same beach by a resident of Saint-Jacut. Then, on 24 May, walkers found a credit card, again on the same beach. Investigators searched the beach thoroughly and the examining magistrate ordered a minesweeper to survey the seabed around the archipelago, but again no traces of Nick were found. On 3 June, another credit card was found off the beach by a diver. These events led the investigators to believe that Godard stopped off at this beach and emptied the contents of his wallet there. Further searches were carried out at the beach, including by a tractor being used to sieve through the sand, but no more of Godard or his family's personal effects were found. However, on 31 July, a fifth credit card was found on the beach. All these cards were analysed at a forensic laboratory, whose experts determined that they had not been in the water for long before being discovered, and had therefore not been thrown into the water in September 1999. It is likely that they were discarded one by one into the water in early 2001. Investigators and the lawyer of Marie-France Godard's family believe that it was the work of an accomplice who wanted to make it look like the deaths of Yves Godard and his children were accidental.

A briefcase believed to belong to Yves Godard was found on 8 August 2003 in Saint-Brieuc Bay. However, investigators have never confirmed its authenticity, and it is likely that it was a hoax.

On 13 September 2006, bones – a femur and a tibia – belonging to Godard were found on the seabed of Hurd's Deep, 70 kilometres (43.5 miles) north of Roscoff. The French Navy minehunter L'Aigle ('The Eagle') was dispatched to the area to try to find a trace of the sailing boat, without success. Confirmation of Godard's death brought about an end to much public interest in the case, but the mystery of the disappearance of his wife – whose body has never been found – and the deaths of Godard and Camille, as well as the very likely death of Marius, remain unsolved: it was either an accident; a murder-suicide perpetrated by Godard, or a family annihilation carried out by a third party with Godard's death made to look like suicide. Therefore, the court file was not immediately closed. On 14 December 2008, a plastic insurance card belonging to Godard was found in perfect condition on the beach at Chapelle, which caused investigators to renew their efforts in the case.

In February 2018, a child's skull was found at a beach in Plérin, sparking speculation that it might belong to Marius.

=== Investigations and witnesses ===
In the autumn and winter of 1999, following the discovery of significant traces of Marie-France Godard's blood at the family home in Juvigny, large-scale searches were carried out in the region to find her body. These searches were suspended without success in mid-January 2000. They were resumed on 27 January 2007, a month after Godard's death was announced. Following a tip-off in an anonymous letter, investigators searched the storeroom of a cemetery in Lingèvres, less than five kilometres (three miles) from the Godard home. There, they found bones, which the letter claimed belonged to Marie-France Godard. However, analysis revealed this was not true. A radiesthesist from Normandy claimed to be the author of the anonymous letter.

On 14 October 1999, a hotel owner on the Isle of Man claimed that Godard and his children had stayed in his hotel between 7 and 14 September. This was the first of a series of witness statements placing Godard and his children at various locations all around the world. Sightings of him were also reported on the Isle of Lewis in Scotland, in South Africa, in Miami and on Crete. In early May 2000, investigations carried out in Madeira, where Godard had opened a bank account, yielded no results. There had been no movements of funds since his disappearance.

In 2011, Eric Lemasson published a book, L'Assassinat du docteur Godard (The Murder of Dr Godard), which shed light on a new theory relating to there being financial reasons behind the disappearance, even including links to the Mafia. The book highlighted several murders of people affiliated to the French trade union, the Confédération de défense des commerçants et artisans (Confederation for the Defence of Salesmen and Craftspeople), in which Godard played a very active role as a member.

=== Case closed ===
On 14 September 2012, the examining magistrate ordered the case to be closed.

In his summation, Alexandre de Bousschère, the Saint-Malo Public Prosecutor, stated: "the only hypothesis we can exclude is that the family's disappearance was a simple sailing accident" and "even if it is the most likely line of investigation, we cannot formally confirm that Yves Godard murdered his family: the case is closed with no charges brought."

== TV and radio documentaries ==
- La mystérieuse disparition du Docteur Godard, 30 October 2005 in Secrets d'actualité on M6 (translation: 'The mysterious disappearance of Dr Godard').
- Disparition du docteur Godard : l'énigme, 11 March and 17 June 2009 in Enquêtes criminelles : le magazine des faits divers on W9 (translation: 'Disappearance of Dr Godard: The Mystery' in 'Criminal Investigations: Miscellaneous News Magazine').
- Affaire Yves Godard, 8 January 2012 in Non élucidé on France 2 (translation: 'Yves Godard Affair' in 'Unsolved').
- Mystérieuses disparitions, November 2000 in Faites entrer l'accusé, presented by Christophe Hondelatte on France 2 (translation: 'Mysterious Disappearances' in 'Will The Accused Please Stand').
- Le mystérieux docteur Godard, 22 and 28 October, 1 and 12 November 2010 in Affaires criminelles on NT1 (translation: 'The Mysterious Dr Godard' in 'Criminal Cases').
- Crimes, presented by Jean-Marc Morandini, broadcast on 17 and 24 February, 4 March, 1, 8, 16 and 28 September 2014, ... en Normandie (first report: Le mystérieux docteur Godard, on NRJ 12 (translation: 'Crimes in Normandy: The Mysterious Dr Godard').

== Fiction ==
Françoise Chandernagor wrote a four-episode series to appear in Le Figaro littéraire, the literary supplement of the Le Figaro newspaper. After the first episode was published in July 2000, Yves Godard's family had the series banned, referring it to a judge in Caen and arguing that it breached the respect for private life guaranteed under Article 9 of the French Civil Code.

== See also ==
- Dupont de Ligonnès murders and disappearance
- List of people who disappeared mysteriously at sea
- List of unsolved deaths

== Bibliography ==
- Éric Lemasson, L'Assassinat du docteur Godard, Paris, Édition des Arènes, 2011, 363 pages (ISBN 978-2-35204-180-1).
- Christian English and Frédéric Thibaud, Affaires non classées (volume 1) (chapter: Le mystère de la disparition du docteur Godard), first edition, 27 May 2003, 334 pages (ISBN 2876917661).
