= 24th Lancers =

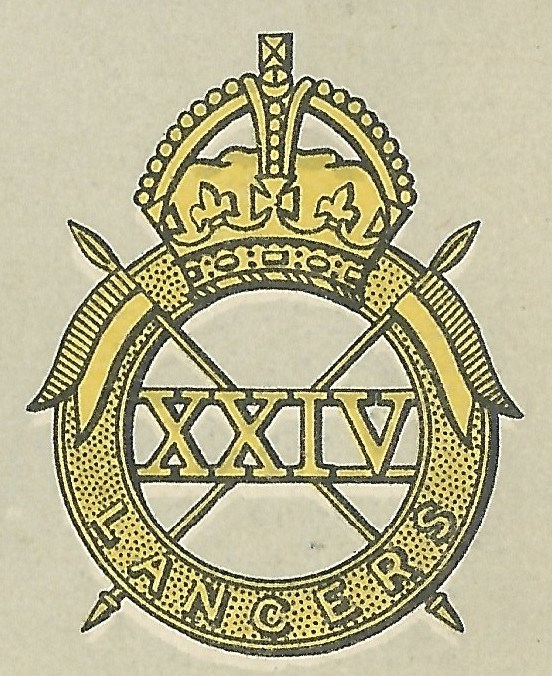
- 24th Lancers' cap badge ca 1941
- Active: 30 December 1940 – 24 July 1944
- Country: United Kingdom
- Branch: British Army
- Type: Cavalry
- Role: Armoured
- Size: Regiment
- Part of: 29th Armoured Brigade; 8th Armoured Brigade.
- Engagements: Second World War North-West Europe 1944 Operation Perch Battle of Villers-Bocage Operation Epsom Operation Martlet

The 24th Lancers was a cavalry regiment of the British Army that existed from late 1940 to mid-1944. Assigned to the 8th Armoured Brigade, the regiment fought during the Invasion of Normandy before being disbanded in July 1944. After disbandment, the regiment's personnel were sent to other cavalry regiments as reinforcements.

== History ==
The regiment was raised in December 1940 from a cadre of personnel taken from the 9th Queen's Royal Lancers and the 17th/21st Lancers; despite its numerical designation, the regiment shared no lineage with the earlier 24th Light Dragoons. It was initially assigned to the 29th Armoured Brigade, which formed part of the 11th Armoured Division, but it was reassigned to the 8th Armoured Brigade on 8 February 1944.

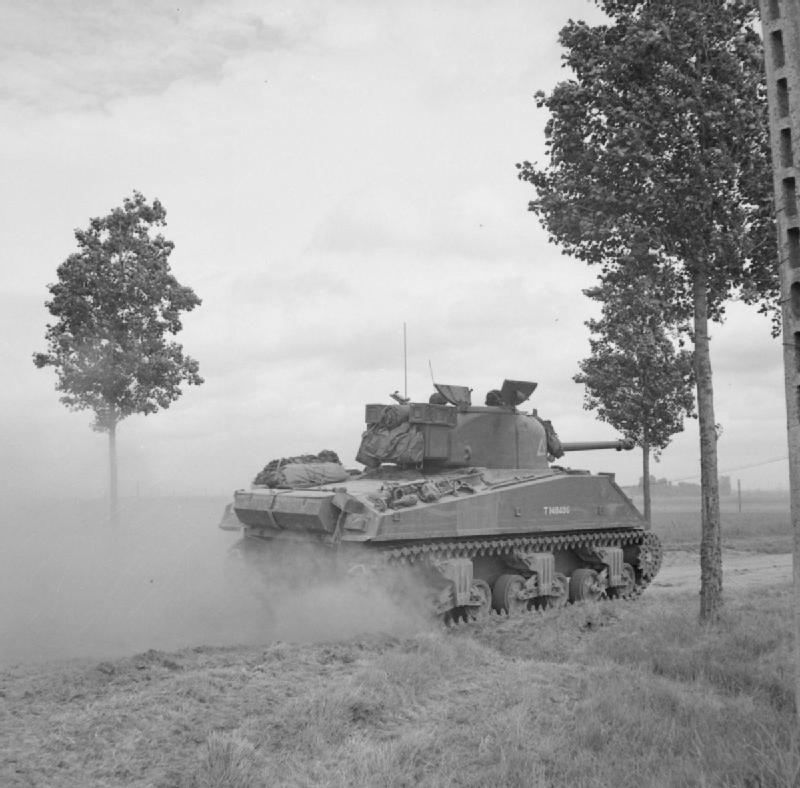
Sherman VC Firefly of 24th Lancers near Saint-Léger, 11 June 1944.

With the 8th Armoured Brigade, the regiment landed on Gold Beach, in the second wave of the Operation Overlord landings, supporting the 50th (Northumbrian) Infantry Division. Around half of the regiment landed on 6 June 1944 (D-Day) and the rest on 7 June 1944 (D+1). Equipped with Sherman tanks, shortly after landing the regiment was involved in the fighting around Putot-en-Bessin and Villers Bocage. After intensive action in the Tilly-sur-Seulles, Fontenay-le-Pesnel, Tessel Wood and Rauray areas, due to a severe shortage of armoured reinforcement personnel across the British Army, the 24th Lancers was disbanded, and its surviving personnel were dispersed as drafts to reinforce other units. Most of these men went to Reinforcement Holding Units and Forward Delivery Squadrons, frontline armoured regiments such as the Sherwood Rangers Yeomanry or other units of the 8th Armoured Brigade, or the 23rd Hussars in the 29th Armoured Brigade in the 11th Armoured Division. Since D-Day, the regiment had lost 41 officers and men killed in action, along with 98 wounded or missing. At the time of its disbandment, the 24th Lancers remained combat-effective, having continued to receive fresh drafts of men and tanks. The decision to dissolve the regiment was driven by a broader shortage of replacements in the British Army, rather than the unit's operational losses. The 24th Lancers were a "Hostilities Only" regiment so their disbandment at this point was the logical choice.

== Battle honours ==
The 24th Lancers was awarded the following battle honours for service in the Second World War:

Putot en Bessin, Villers Bocage, Tilly sur Seulles, The Odon, Fontenay le Pesnil, Defence of Rauray, North-West Europe 1944

== Bibliography ==
- Bellis, Malcolm A. (1994). Regiments of the British Army 1939–1945 (Armour & Infantry). London: Military Press International. ISBN 0-85420-999-9.
- Joslen, Lt-Col H.F. (1990) [1st. Pub. HMSO:1960]. Orders of Battle, Second World War, 1939–1945. London: London Stamp Exchange. ISBN 0-948130-03-2.
- Willis, Leonard (1985). None Had Lances: The Story of the 24th Lancers. 24th Lancers Old Comrades Association. ISBN 978-095107180-9.
