= John da Cunha =

John Wilfrid da Cunha (6 September 1922 – 12 May 2006) was a British barrister and circuit judge. He was a member of the British delegation to the Nuremberg War Crimes Tribunal.

Born in Manchester, da Cunha's father, Frank da Cunha, was a GP who came to Manchester from Goa to study and never left. John da Cunha was educated at Stonyhurst and read law at St John's College, Cambridge. During the Second World War, he was commissioned into the 23rd Hussars, commanding a tank. He landed at Sword, four days after D-Day. Da Cunha was seriously wounded by shrapnel in an attack on Caen, a few weeks later.

While recuperating, he was seconded by the Judge Advocate General's department and sent, at age 23, as a junior counsel to the British headquarters at Bad Oeynhausen to assist Group Captain Tony Somerhough in preparing for the war crimes trials. He recalled being physically sick after opening his first file. He persevered, and interviewed survivors and witnesses from German concentration camps. He was closely involved with the Ravensbrück Trials. He took up the legal profession when he returned to England from Germany, being called to the Bar by the Middle Temple in 1948 and becoming a barrister in Manchester in the chambers of Tommy Backhouse. Among his pupils were Sir Rhys Davies, Baroness Hale of Richmond and Jonathan Geake.

He married in 1953 and had 5 children. Rather than taking silk, he became a County Court judge in 1970. He sat on Diplock courts in Northern Ireland in 1973, supervising internment without trial under the Northern Ireland Emergency Provision Act, and later as a deputy High Court judge. In retirement, he was a member of the Parole Board Appeals Tribunal from 1976 to 1978, and a member of the Criminal Injuries Compensation Board.
