= 23rd Hussars =

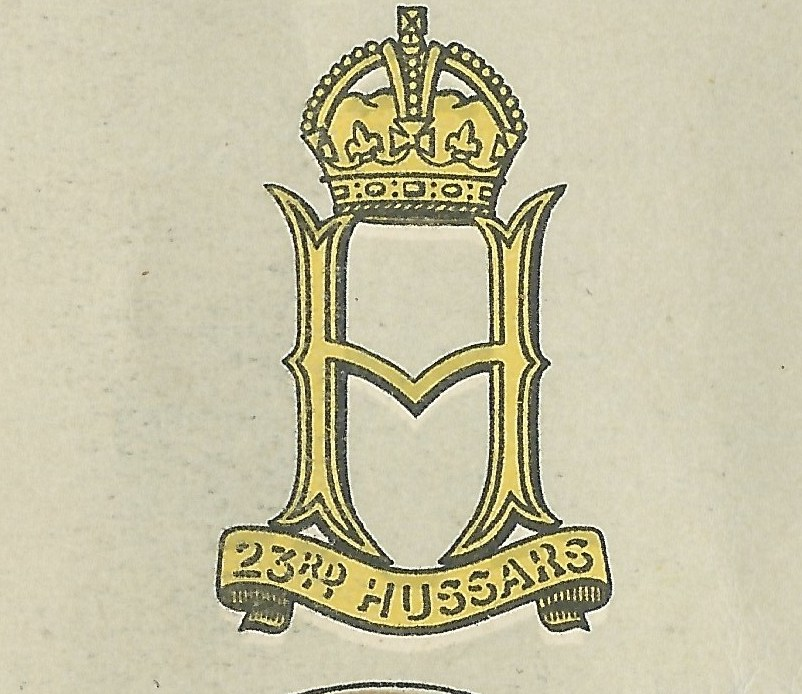
- Cap Badge of the 23rd Hussars ca 1941
- Active: 1940-1946
- Country: United Kingdom
- Branch: British Army
- Type: Cavalry
- Size: Regiment

Commanders
- Notable commanders: General Sir Cecil Blacker

The 23rd Hussars was a cavalry regiment of the British Army raised during World War II and in existence from 1940 to 1946. It had no lineal connection with the earlier 23rd Regiment of (Light) Dragoons (1794–1802).

== History ==
The regiment was raised in December 1940 from a cadre of personnel taken from the 10th Royal Hussars (Prince of Wales's Own) and the 15th/19th The King's Royal Hussars. It was assigned to 29th Armoured Brigade of 11th Armoured Division.

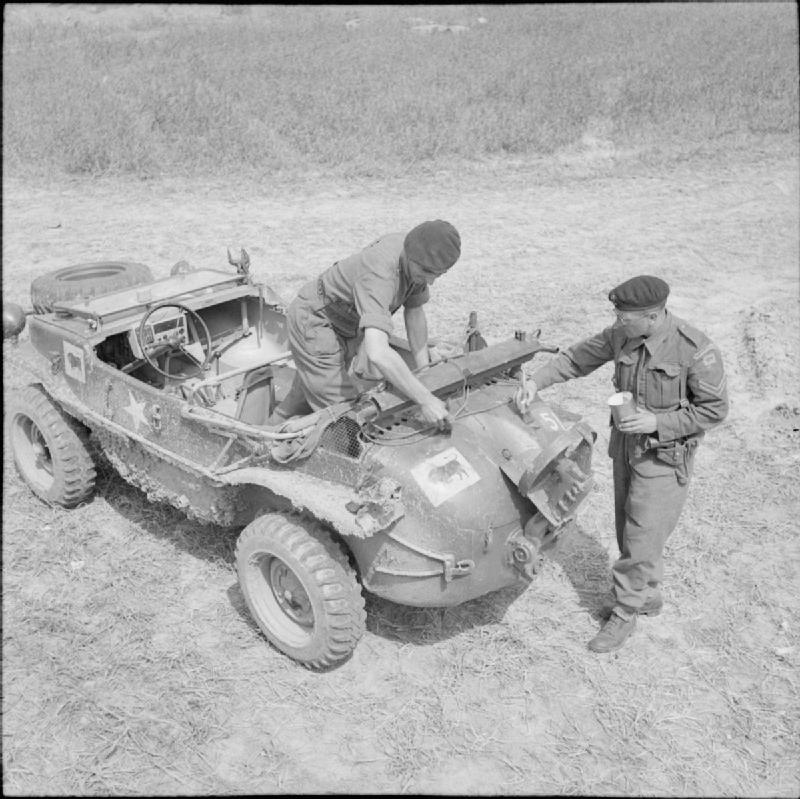
Men of the 23rd Hussars, 11th Armoured Division, painting divisional and arm of service markings on a German Schwimmwagen captured from the 12th SS Panzer Division (HitlerJugend), in Normandy, 6 July 1944.

The 11th Armoured Division landed in France in June 1944, taking heavy casualties in the Battle of Normandy. It spearheaded Operation Epsom, reaching the Odon river between Mouen and Mondrainville. It was embroiled in Operation Goodwood, where its assault on Bourguébus Ridge on the first day was brought to a halt. After Goodwood, the losses of armour within the division were so high that the 24th Lancers were disbanded and its remnants absorbed by the 23rd Hussars. The Regiment then took part in Operation Bluecoat, intended to secure the key road junction of Vire and the high ground of Mont Pinçon, which would allow the American exploitation of their breakout on the western flank of the Normandy beachhead. The 11th Armoured Division was subsequently attached to XXX Corps, which captured Flers, Putanges and Argentan in the battle of the Falaise pocket.

Once the Falaise pocket was sealed, the Regiment remained with the 11th Armoured Division as it liberated L'Aigle on 23 August. It crossed the Seine on 28 August and, after an advance of 60 miles in one day, liberated Amiens on 1 September and Antwerp on 4 September. It was not directly involved in the ground actions of Operation Market Garden, but covered the right flank of the advancing XXX Corps.

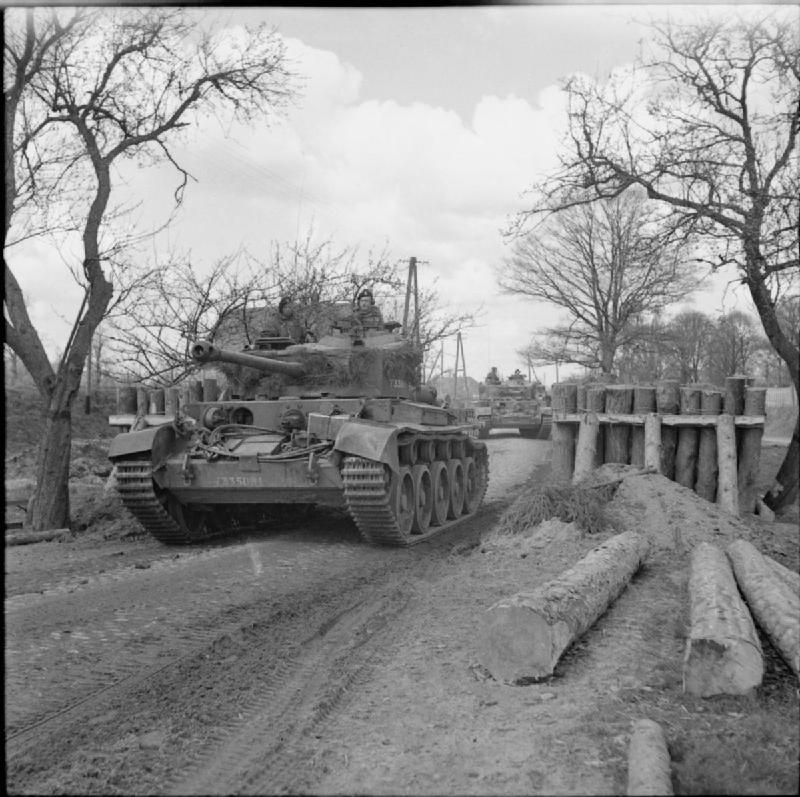
A Comet tank of the 23rd Hussars near Petershagen, Germany, 7 April 1945.

It was in reserve, being re-equipped with Comet tanks, at the time of the Ardennes Offensive, but was rapidly deployed into a defensive line along the Meuse with its old tanks. In 1945, it took part in Operations Veritable and Blockbuster and liberated Bergen-Belsen concentration camp before crossing the Elbe and capturing Lübeck. It was disbanded at the end of January 1946.

== Battle honours ==
The Second World War: The Odon, Bourguébus Ridge, Le Perier Ridge, Amiens 1944, Antwerp, Venraij, Venlo Pocket, Ourthe, North-West Europe 1944-45

== Notable members ==
- John Addison, film music composer
- Cecil Blacker, later Adjutant-General to the Forces
- John da Cunha, barrister and later judge. Part of the British delegation to the Nuremberg War Crimes Tribunal
- Sir Alan Glyn, Member of Parliament

== Sources ==
- Copp, T. (2007) [2003]. Fields of Fire: The Canadians in Normandy. Toronto: University of Toronto Press. ISBN 978-0-8020-3780-0.
- Doherty, Richard (2013). British Armoured Divisions and Their Commanders, 1939–1945. Pen and Sword. ISBN 978-1848848382.
- Joslen, H. F. (2003) [1960]. Orders of Battle: Second World War, 1939–1945. Uckfield, East Sussex: Naval and Military Press. ISBN 978-1-84342-474-1.
