= 29th Armoured Brigade =

- Insignia of the 29th's parent organization, the 11th Armoured Division
- Active: 1940–1946
- Country: United Kingdom
- Branch: British Army
- Type: Armoured
- Size: Brigade
- Part of: 11th Armoured Division
- Engagements: Battle of Normandy; Operation Epsom; Operation Goodwood; Operation Bluecoat; Falaise pocket Operation Market Garden; Battle of the Bulge

The 29th Armoured Brigade was a Second World War British Army brigade equipped with tanks that formed the armoured component of the 11th Armoured Division.

== History ==
Created in 1940 it served mainly with the 11th Armoured Division, notably in the Battle of Normandy and the campaign in Western Europe. It played a significant role stopping the progress of Kampfgruppe Böhm during the Battle of the Bulge on 25 and 26 December 1944. The Kampfgruppe had penetrated the furthest during the last German offensive in the West.

== Order of battle ==
The 29th Armoured Brigade was constituted with three armoured regiments and one infantry battalion during the war:

- 22nd Dragoons - from 30 December 1940 until 8 January 1941 transferred to 30th Brigade
- 24th Lancers - from 30 December 1940 until 6 February 1944 transferred to 8th Armoured Brigade
- 23rd Hussars - from 8 January 1941. Sherman tank and Sherman Firefly. Re-equipped with Comet tanks at end of 1944.
- 2nd Fife and Forfar Yeomanry - from 7 June 1941
- 3rd Royal Tank Regiment - from 6 February 1944, with Sherman and Sherman Firefly tanks. Re-equipped with Comet tanks.

The brigade's motorized infantry element at formation was 2nd Battalion, London Rifle Brigade (transferred from 5th London Brigade) which in January 1941 was renamed the 8th Battalion, Rifle Brigade (Prince Consort's Own).

== See also ==
- British Armoured formations of World War II
- List of British brigades of the Second World War

== Bibliography ==
- Bellis, Malcolm A. (1994). Regiments of the British Army 1939–1945 (Armour & Infantry). London: Military Press International. ISBN 0-85420-999-9.
- Joslen, H. F. (2003) [1960]. Orders of Battle: Second World War, 1939–1945. Uckfield, East Sussex: Naval and Military Press. ISBN 978-1-84342-474-1.
