= Kloppenburg =

Kloppenburg is a surname. Notable people with the surname include:

- JoAnne Kloppenburg (born 1953), Wisconsin assistant attorney general
- Bob Kloppenburg (born 1927), American professional basketball coach
- Carlos Kloppenburg (1919–2009), German-born Brazilian bishop of the Roman Catholic Church
- Feiko Kloppenburg (born 1974), Dutch cricketer
