= Saint-Léger, Pas-de-Calais =

Saint-Léger
- Commune
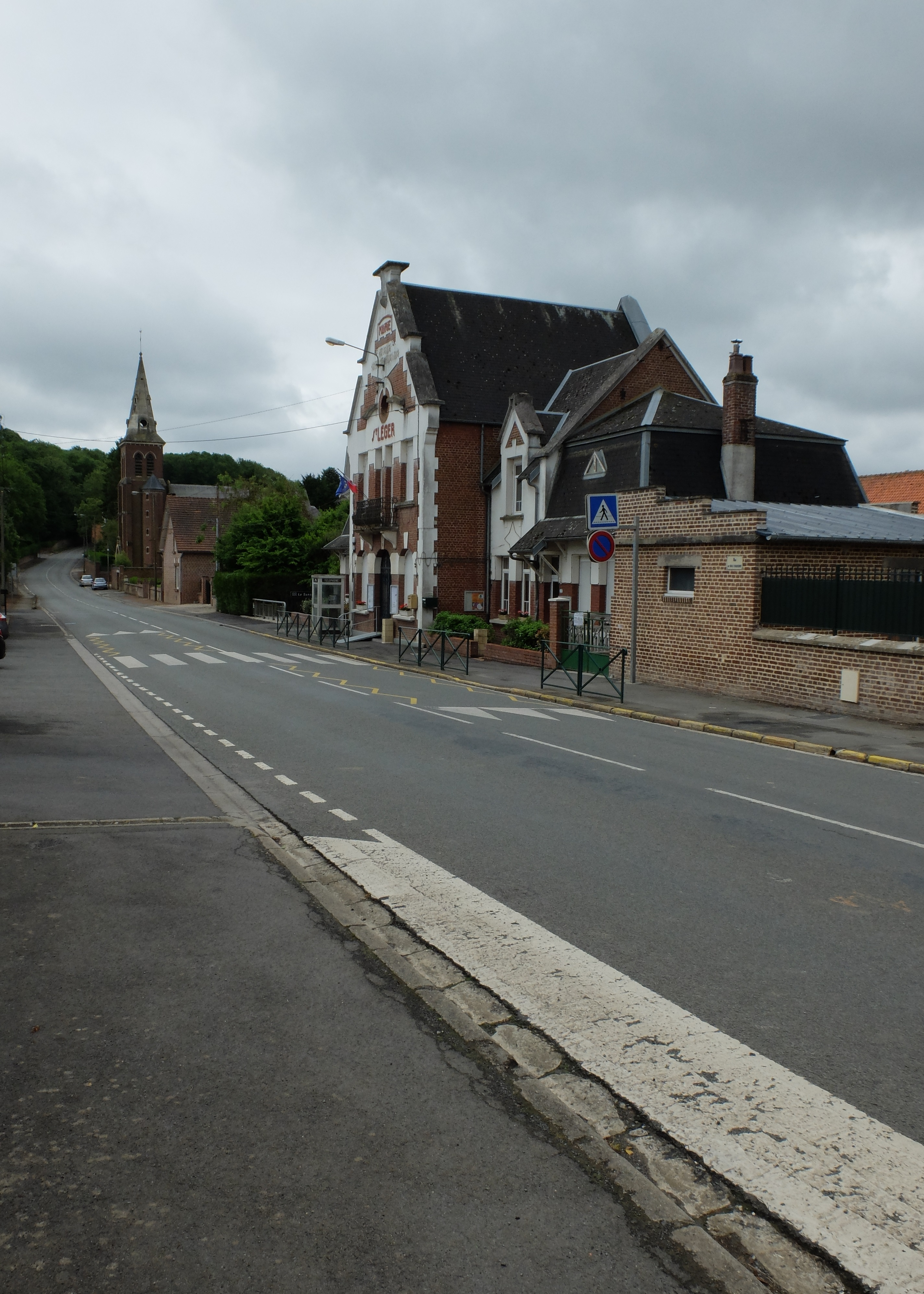
- The town hall and church of Saint-Léger

- Coat of arms
- Location of Saint-Léger
- Location within France Location within Hauts-de-France
- Coordinates: 50°11′13″N 2°51′31″E
- Country: France
- Region: Hauts-de-France
- Department: Pas-de-Calais
- Arrondissement: Arras
- Canton: Bapaume
- Intercommunality: CC Sud-Artois

Government
  - Mayor (2020–2026): Michel Blondel
- Area^{1}: 7.47 km^{2} (2.88 sq mi)
- Elevation: 83 m (272 ft)
- Highest elevation: 117 m (384 ft)
- Lowest elevation: 69 m (226 ft)
- Population (2023): 520
  - Density: 70/km^{2} (180/sq mi)
- Time zone: UTC+01:00 (CET)
  - Summer (DST): UTC+02:00 (CEST)
- INSEE/Postal code: 62754 /62128
- ^{1} French Land Register data, which excludes lakes, ponds, glaciers > 1 km^{2} (0.386 sq mi or 247 acres) and river estuaries.

Saint-Léger (French pronunciation: [sɛ̃ leʒe]) is a commune in the Pas-de-Calais department in the Hauts-de-France region of France.

== Geography ==
Saint-Léger lies 10 miles (16 km) south of Arras, at the junction of the D12, D9 and D36E roads. The A1 autoroute passes by half a mile to the east of the commune.

== Population ==
Historical population
Year	Pop.	±% p.a.
1968	447	—
1975	422	−0.82%
1982	413	−0.31%
1990	392	−0.65%
1999	393	+0.03%
2007	404	+0.35%
2012	423	+0.92%
2017	450	+1.25%
2023	520	+2.44%
Source: INSEE

== Places of interest ==
- The church of St.Leger, rebuilt, as was all of the village, after the First World War.
- The Commonwealth War Graves Commission cemetery.

== See also ==
Communes of the Pas-de-Calais department
