= Juvigny-sur-Seulles =

- Commune
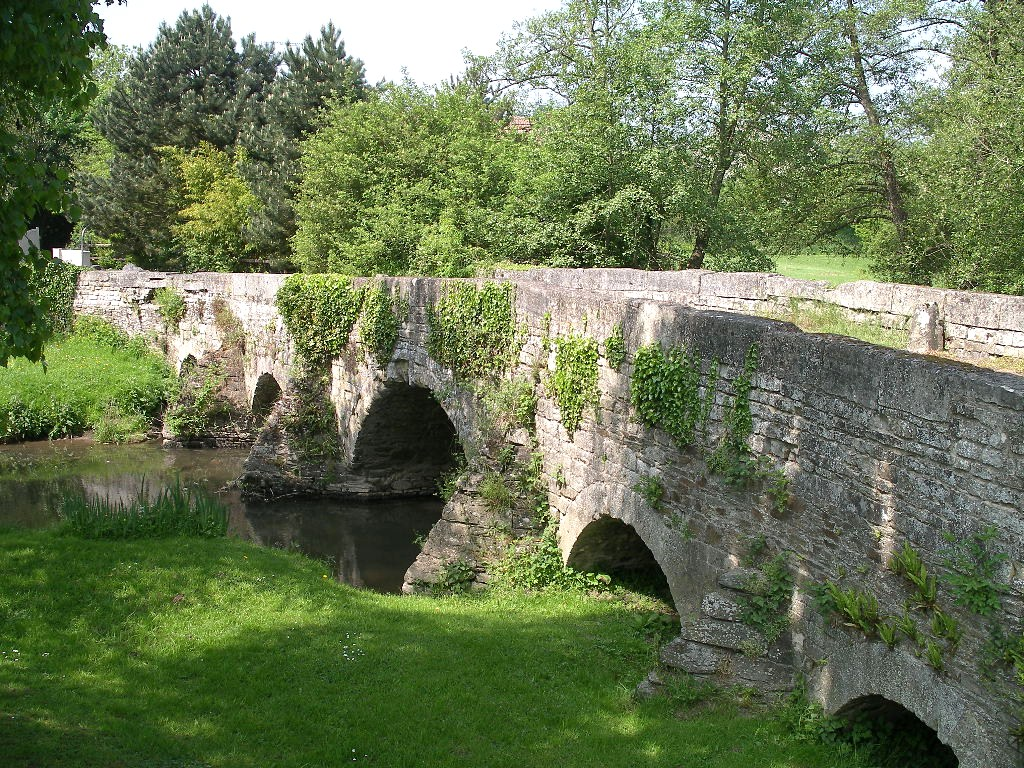
- The old bridge in Juvigny-sur-Seulles
- Location of Juvigny-sur-Seulles
- Location within France Location within Normandy
- Coordinates: 49°09′47″N 0°36′45″W
- Country: France
- Region: Normandy
- Department: Calvados
- Arrondissement: Bayeux
- Canton: Thue et Mue
- Intercommunality: CC Seulles Terre Mer

Government
  - Mayor (2022–2026): Dominique Angot
- Area^{1}: 3.53 km^{2} (1.36 sq mi)
- Elevation: 110 m (360 ft)
- Highest elevation: 118 m (387 ft)
- Lowest elevation: 53 m (174 ft)
- Population (2023): 77
  - Density: 22/km^{2} (56/sq mi)
- Time zone: UTC+01:00 (CET)
  - Summer (DST): UTC+02:00 (CEST)
- INSEE/Postal code: 14348 /14250
- ^{1} French Land Register data, which excludes lakes, ponds, glaciers > 1 km^{2} (0.386 sq mi or 247 acres) and river estuaries.

Juvigny-sur-Seulles (French pronunciation: [ʒyviɲi syʁ sœl]) is a commune in the Calvados department in the Normandy region in northwestern France.

== Population ==
Historical population
Year	Pop.	±% p.a.
1968	61	—
1975	61	+0.00%
1982	50	−2.80%
1990	51	+0.25%
1999	55	+0.84%
2007	65	+2.11%
2012	74	+2.63%
2017	84	+2.57%
2023	77	−1.44%
Source: INSEE

== See also ==
- Communes of the Calvados department
