= 1st Brigade =

1st Brigade may refer to:

== Argentina ==
- I Armored Brigade (Argentina)

== Australia ==
- 1st Armoured Brigade (Australia)
- 1st Brigade (Australia)
- 1st Light Horse Brigade
- 1st Motor Brigade (Australia)

== Bosnia ==
- 1st Bihać Infantry Brigade
- 1st Višegrad Brigade

== Brazil ==
- 1st Mechanized Cavalry Brigade

== British Burma ==
- 1st Burma Infantry Brigade

== British India ==
- 1st (Risalpur) Cavalry Brigade
- 1st Quetta Brigade

== British Malaya ==
- 1st Malaya Infantry Brigade

== Canada ==
- 1st Canadian Armoured Brigade
- 1st Canadian Infantry Brigade
- 1 Canadian Mechanized Brigade Group

== China ==
- 1st Armored Brigade (People's Republic of China)
- 1st Fighter Brigade

== Confederate States of America ==
- First Missouri Brigade

== Croatia ==
- 1st Guards Brigade (Croatia)

== Czechoslovakia ==
- 1st Czechoslovak Independent Armoured Brigade

== Estonia ==
- 1st Infantry Brigade (Estonia)

== France ==
- 1st Cavalry Brigade (France)
- 1st Mechanised Brigade (France)

== Georgia ==
- 1st Infantry Brigade (Georgia)

== Germany ==
- 1st Airmobile Brigade (Bundeswehr)
- 1st Panzergrenadier Brigade (Germany)
- 1st SS Infantry Brigade
- German 1st Light Brigade

== Greece ==
- 1st Army Aviation Brigade (Greece)
- 1st Raider–Paratrooper Brigade (Greece)

== Hungary ==
- 1st Armored Brigade "György Klapka"
- 1st Cavalry Brigade (Hungary)
- 1st Infantry Brigade (Hungary)
- 1st Motorised Brigade (Hungary)

== India ==
- 1st Indian Infantry Brigade

== Indonesia ==
- 1st Cavalry Brigade (Indonesia)
- 1st Mechanized Infantry Brigade (Indonesia)

== Iran ==
- 1st Ashura Brigade
- 1st Marine Brigade (Iran)

== Iraq ==
- 1st Iraqi Armored Brigade

== Ireland ==
- 1st Brigade (Ireland)

== Israel ==
- Golani Brigade

== Italy ==
- 1st Carabinieri Mobile Brigade

== Japan ==
- 1st Airborne Brigade (Japan)
- 1st Artillery Brigade (Japan)
- 1st Cavalry Brigade (Imperial Japanese Army)
- 1st Guards Infantry Brigade (Imperial Japanese Army)
- 1st Helicopter Brigade
- 1st Independent Mixed Brigade (Imperial Japanese Army)

== Lithuania ==
- 1st Lithuanian National Cavalry Brigade

== Moldova ==
- 1st Motorized Infantry Brigade "Moldova"

== New Zealand ==
- 1st Brigade (New Zealand)
- 1st New Zealand Army Tank Brigade

== North Macedonia ==
- 1st Mechanized Infantry Brigade (North Macedonia)

== Philippines ==
- 1st Brigade Combat Team (Philippines)

== Poland ==
- 1st Aviation Brigade (Poland)
- 1st Brigade, Polish Legions
- 1st Independent Parachute Brigade (Poland)
- 1st Mountain Brigade (Poland)
- 1st Podlaska Territorial Defence Brigade
- 1st Warsaw Armoured Brigade

== Republika Srpska ==
- 1st Guards Brigade (Army of Republika Srpska)

== Romania ==
- 1st Logistics Brigade (Romania)
- 1st Maneuver Support Brigade (Romania)
- 1st Surface to Air Missiles Brigade (Romania)

== Russia ==
- 1st Guards Engineer Brigade
- 1st Guards NBC Protection Brigade
- 1st Guards Rocket Brigade
- 1st Independent Guards Tank Brigade
- 1st Separate Airborne Brigade
- 1st Separate Guards Motor Rifle Brigade
- 1st Siberian Assault Brigade
- 1st Siberian Rifle Artillery Brigade
- 1st Slavyansk Brigade

== Serbia ==
- 1st Army Brigade

== Slovakia ==
- 1st Mechanized Brigade (Slovakia)

== Slovenia ==
- 1st Brigade (Slovenian Armed Forces)

== South Africa ==
- First Reserve Brigade (South Africa)
- 1st Field Brigade (CFA)
- 1st South African Infantry Brigade

== South Korea ==
- 1st Air Defense Brigade (South Korea)
- 1st Armored Brigade (South Korea)
- 1st Artillery Brigade (South Korea)
- 1st Combat Aviation Brigade (South Korea)
- 1st Special Forces Brigade (South Korea)

== Soviet Union ==
- 1st Airborne Brigade (Soviet Union)
- 1st Belarusian Partisan Brigade
- 1st Guards Rocket Brigade
- 1st Leningrad Tank Brigade
- 1st Light Tank Brigade (Soviet Union)
- 1st Separate Women's Volunteer Rifle Brigade
- 1st Tank Brigade (Soviet Union)

== Spain ==
- 1st Mixed Brigade

== Syria ==
- 1st Infantry Brigade (Syrian rebel group)
- 1st Brigade (Syrian rebel group)

== Sweden ==
- 1st Coastal Artillery Brigade
- Life Guards Brigade

== Turkey ==
- 1st Commando Brigade (Turkey)

== Ukraine ==
- 1st Air Force Combined Rifles Brigade (Ukraine)
- 1st Heavy Mechanized Brigade
- 1st Presidential Operational Brigade (Ukraine)
- 1st Radio Technical Brigade (Ukraine)
- 1st Road Restoration Brigade (Ukraine)
- 1st Special Purpose Brigade (Ukraine)

== United Kingdom ==
- 1st Airlanding Brigade (United Kingdom)
- 1st Anti-Aircraft Brigade (United Kingdom)
- 1st Army Tank Brigade (United Kingdom)
- 1st Armoured Brigade (United Kingdom)
- 1st Armoured Infantry Brigade (United Kingdom)
- 1st Armoured Reconnaissance Brigade (United Kingdom)
- 1st Artillery Brigade (United Kingdom)
- 1st Assault Brigade Royal Engineers
- 1st Aviation Brigade (United Kingdom)
- 1st Brigade Royal Flying Corps
- 1st Cavalry Brigade (United Kingdom)
- 1st Composite Mounted Brigade
- 1st Dismounted Brigade
- 1st Gibraltar Brigade
- 1st Guards Brigade (United Kingdom)
- 1st Intelligence and Surveillance Brigade
- 1st Military Intelligence Brigade (United Kingdom)
- 1st Military Police Brigade
- 1st Parachute Brigade (United Kingdom)
- 1st Provisional Brigade (United Kingdom)
- 1st Reconnaissance Brigade (United Kingdom)
- 1st Reserve Brigade
- 1st Royal Naval Brigade
- 1st SAS Brigade, a fictional unit
- 1st Signal Brigade (United Kingdom)
- 1st South Western Mounted Brigade
- 1st Special Service Brigade
- 1st Strike Brigade
- 1st Queen's Edinburgh Rifle Volunteer Brigade
- 1st Tower Hamlets Rifle Volunteer Brigade
- 1st (West Africa) Infantry Brigade

=== Artillery units ===
- 1st Brigade, Royal Field Artillery
- 1st Administrative Brigade, Anglesey Artillery Volunteers
- 1st Administrative Brigade, Cumberland Artillery Volunteers
- 1st Administrative Brigade, Northumberland Artillery Volunteers
- 1st Administrative Brigade, Yorkshire (West Riding) Artillery Volunteers
- 1st East Lancashire Brigade, Royal Field Artillery
- 1st (Somerset) Army Brigade, Royal Field Artillery
- 1st South Midland Brigade, Royal Field Artillery
- 1st (Highland) Medium Brigade, Royal Garrison Artillery
- I Brigade, Royal Horse Artillery
- I Brigade, Royal Horse Artillery (T.F.)

== United States ==
- 1st Air Cavalry Brigade
- 1st Armored Division Sustainment Brigade
- 1st Aviation Brigade
- 1st Brigade, 7th Infantry Division (United States)
- 1st Brigade, 24th Infantry Division (United States)
- 1st Brigade, 104th Division (United States)
- 1st Brigade Georgia Militia
- 1st Cavalry Division Sustainment Brigade
- 1st Engineer Brigade (United States)
- 1st Infantry Training Brigade
- 1st Maneuver Enhancement Brigade
- 1st Marine Expeditionary Brigade (United States)
- 1st Medical Brigade
- 1st Provisional Air Brigade
- 1st Provisional Marine Brigade
- 1st Reserve Officers' Training Corps Brigade
- 1st Security Force Assistance Brigade
- 1st Separate Brigade (Philippine Expedition)
- 1st Signal Brigade (United States)
- 1st Space Brigade
- 1st Sustainment Brigade (United States)
- 1st Tank Destroyer Brigade
- 1st Vermont Brigade

=== Brigade Combat Teams ===
- 1st Armored Brigade Combat Team, 34th Infantry Division
- 1st Brigade Combat Team, 1st Armored Division
- 1st Brigade Combat Team, 1st Infantry Division (United States)
- 1st Brigade Combat Team, 1st Cavalry Division (United States)
- 1st Brigade Combat Team, 10th Mountain Division (United States)
- 1st Brigade Combat Team, 82nd Airborne Division
- 1st Infantry Brigade Combat Team, 11th Airborne Division

== Yugoslavia ==
- 1st Muslim Brigade (Yugoslav Partisans)
- 1st Proletarian Brigade (Yugoslav Partisans)
- First Sisak Partisan Brigade

== See also ==
- 1st Army (disambiguation)
- 1st Corps (disambiguation)
- 1st Division (disambiguation)
- 1st Regiment (disambiguation)
