= 1st Cavalry =

1st Cavalry, 1st Cavalry Division, 1st Cavalry Brigade, 1st Cavalry Regiment or 1st Cavalry Battalion may refer to:

== Armies ==
- 1st Cavalry Army, Soviet Union

== Corps ==
- I Cavalry Corps (Grande Armée)
- I Cavalry Corps (German Empire)
- I Cavalry Corps (Wehrmacht)
- 1st Cavalry Corps (Russian Empire)
- 1st Guards Cavalry Corps

== Divisions ==
- 1st Cavalry Division (Australia)
- 1st Cavalry Division (Belgium)
- 1st Light Cavalry Division (France)
- 1st Foot Cavalry Division (France)
- 1st Cavalry Division (German Empire)
- 1st Cavalry Division (Reichswehr), Germany
- 1st Cavalry Division (Wehrmacht), Germany
- 1st Cossack Cavalry Division, a unit of the Wehrmacht, Germany
- 1st Indian Cavalry Division
- 1st Cavalry Division Eugenio di Savoia, a unit of the Royal Italian Army
- 1st Cavalry Division (Poland)
- 1st Cavalry Division (Russian Empire)
- 1st Guards Cavalry Division (Russian Empire)
- 1st Cavalry Division (Soviet Union)
- 1st Mountain Cavalry Division (Soviet Union)
- 1st Cavalry Division (United Kingdom)
- 1st Cavalry Division (United States)
- 1st Cavalry Division (Kingdom of Yugoslavia)

== Brigades ==
- 1st Cavalry Brigade (Australia)
- 1st Mechanized Cavalry Brigade, Brazil
- 1st Cavalry Brigade (France)
- 1st Cavalry Brigade (Wehrmacht), Germany
- 1st Cavalry Brigade (Hungary)
- 1st (Risalpur) Cavalry Brigade, a unit of the Indian Army
- 1st Cavalry Brigade (Imperial Japanese Army)
- 1st Cavalry Brigade (Poland)
- 1st Cavalry Brigade (United Kingdom)
- 1st Cavalry Brigade (United States)
- 1st Air Cavalry Brigade, 1st Cavalry Division (United States)

== Regiments and battalions ==
=== France ===
- 1st Foreign Cavalry Regiment, a unit of the French Foreign Legion
- 1st Polish Light Cavalry Regiment of the Imperial Guard, a unit of Napoleonic France
- 1st Spahi Regiment
- 1st Parachute Hussar Regiment

=== Germany ===
- 1st Royal Bavarian Heavy Cavalry (Prince Charles of Bavaria's)
- 1st Royal Bavarian Chevau-légers "Emperor Nicholas of Russia"
- 1st Royal Bavarian Uhlans "Emperor William II, King of Prussia"
- 1st Royal Saxon Guards Heavy Cavalry
- 1st King's Mounted Rifles
- 1st (Silesian) Life Cuirassiers "Great Elector"
- 1st Guards Uhlans

=== United States ===
- 1st Cavalry Regiment (United States)
- 1st Cavalry Regiment (1855)
- 1st United States Volunteer Cavalry

==== Union Army (American Civil War) ====
- 1st Regiment Alabama Cavalry (Union)
- 1st Regiment Arkansas Cavalry (Union)
- 1st California Cavalry Regiment
- 1st California Cavalry Battalion
- 1st Colorado Cavalry Regiment
- 1st Connecticut Cavalry Regiment
- 1st Dakota Cavalry Battalion
- 1st Florida Cavalry Regiment (Union)
- 1st Illinois Cavalry Regiment
- 1st Iowa Volunteer Cavalry Regiment
- 1st Louisiana Cavalry Regiment (Union)
- 1st Maine Volunteer Cavalry Regiment
- 1st Regiment Maryland Volunteer Cavalry
- 1st Maryland Cavalry Regiment
- 1st Michigan Volunteer Cavalry Regiment
- 1st Minnesota Volunteer Cavalry Regiment
- 1st Regiment Nebraska Volunteer Cavalry
- 1st New Jersey Volunteer Cavalry
- 1st Ohio Cavalry
- 1st Oregon Volunteer Cavalry Regiment
- 1st Pennsylvania Cavalry Regiment
- 1st Rhode Island Cavalry
- 1st Texas Cavalry Regiment (Union)
- 1st United States Colored Cavalry Regiment
- 1st Vermont Cavalry
- 1st West Virginia Volunteer Cavalry Regiment
- 1st Wisconsin Volunteer Cavalry Regiment

==== Confederate Army (American Civil War) ====
- 1st Regiment Alabama Volunteer Cavalry (Confederate)
- 1st Arkansas Cavalry Regiment (Crawford's)
- 1st Arkansas Cavalry Regiment (Dobbin's)
- 1st Cavalry Regiment, Arkansas State Troops
- 1st Florida Cavalry Regiment (Confederate)
- 1st Florida Special Cavalry Battalion
- 1st Georgia Cavalry
- 1st Battalion, Georgia Cavalry
- 1st Louisiana Cavalry Regiment (Confederate)
- 1st Mississippi Cavalry Regiment
- 1st North Carolina Cavalry Regiment
- 6th Arkansas Cavalry Regiment, also known as the 1st Trans-Mississippi Cavalry Regiment
- 1st Virginia Cavalry

=== Others ===
- 1st Cavalry Regiment (Chile)
