= 1st Aviation Brigade =

1st Aviation Brigade may refer to:

- 1st Army Aviation Brigade, Greece
- 1st Aviation Brigade (Poland)
- 1st Combat Aviation Brigade (South Korea)
- 1st Aviation Brigade (United Kingdom)
- 1st Aviation Brigade (United States)
- 1st Combat Aviation Brigade, 1st Infantry Division, United States

== See also ==
- 1st Brigade (disambiguation)
