= 1st Mechanized Infantry Brigade =

1st Mechanized Infantry Brigade may refer to:

- 1st Mechanized Infantry Brigade (Indonesia)
- 1st Mechanized Infantry Brigade (North Macedonia)

== See also ==
- 1st Mechanized Brigade (disambiguation)
- 1st Brigade (disambiguation)
