= Philippine expedition =

The Philippine expedition may refer to:

- Philippine expedition (Albatross), a scientific research expedition to the Philippines from 1907 to 1910.
- 1st Separate Brigade (Philippine Expedition), an expeditionary brigade of the United States Army, organized during the Spanish–American War.
- Miguel López de Legazpi's 16th century travel to the Philippines to establish a permanent Spanish colony.
