= Wesley Merritt =

American politician and general (1836–1910)

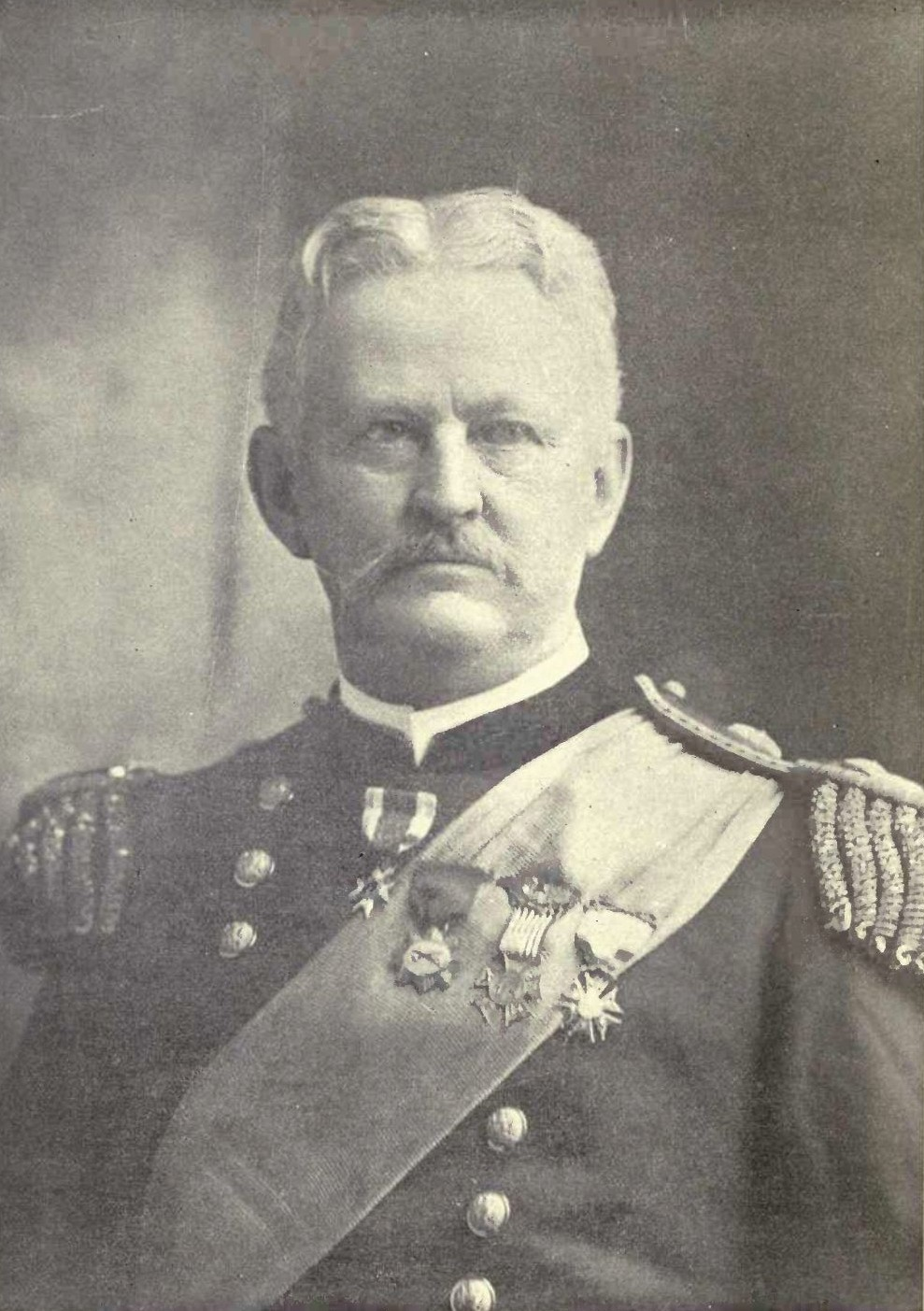
- Merritt c. 1898

1st Military Governor of the Philippines
- In office August 14, 1898 – August 30, 1898
- President: William McKinley
- Preceded by: Diego de los Ríos (as Spanish Governor-General of the Philippines)
- Succeeded by: Elwell Stephen Otis

Personal details
- Born: June 16, 1836 New York City, New York, U.S.
- Died: December 3, 1910 (aged 74) Natural Bridge, Virginia, U.S.
- Spouse(s): Caroline Warren Merritt (1849 – June 12, 1893); Laura Williams Merritt

Military service
- Allegiance: United States
- Branch/service: United States Army
- Years of service: 1860–1900
- Rank: Major General
- Battles/wars: List: American Civil War; Chancellorsville campaign; Battle of Chancellorsville; Gettysburg campaign; Battle of Brandy Station; Battle of Upperville; Battle of Gettysburg; Overland Campaign; Battle of Yellow Tavern; Sheridan's Shenandoah Valley campaign; Third Battle of Winchester; Appomattox campaign; Battle of Five Forks; Great Sioux War of 1876; Battle of Slim Buttes; Spanish–American War; Pacific Theater; Battle of Manila

Wesley Merritt (June 16, 1834 – December 3, 1910) was an American major general who served in the cavalry of the United States Army during the American Civil War, American Indian Wars, and Spanish–American War. Following the latter war, he became the first American Military Governor of the Philippines.

== Early life ==
Merritt was born in New York City. He graduated from the United States Military Academy in 1860 and was commissioned a second lieutenant in the 2nd Dragoons, serving initially in Utah under John Buford. He became the adjutant for the unit when it was renamed the 2nd Cavalry Regiment.

== American Civil War ==
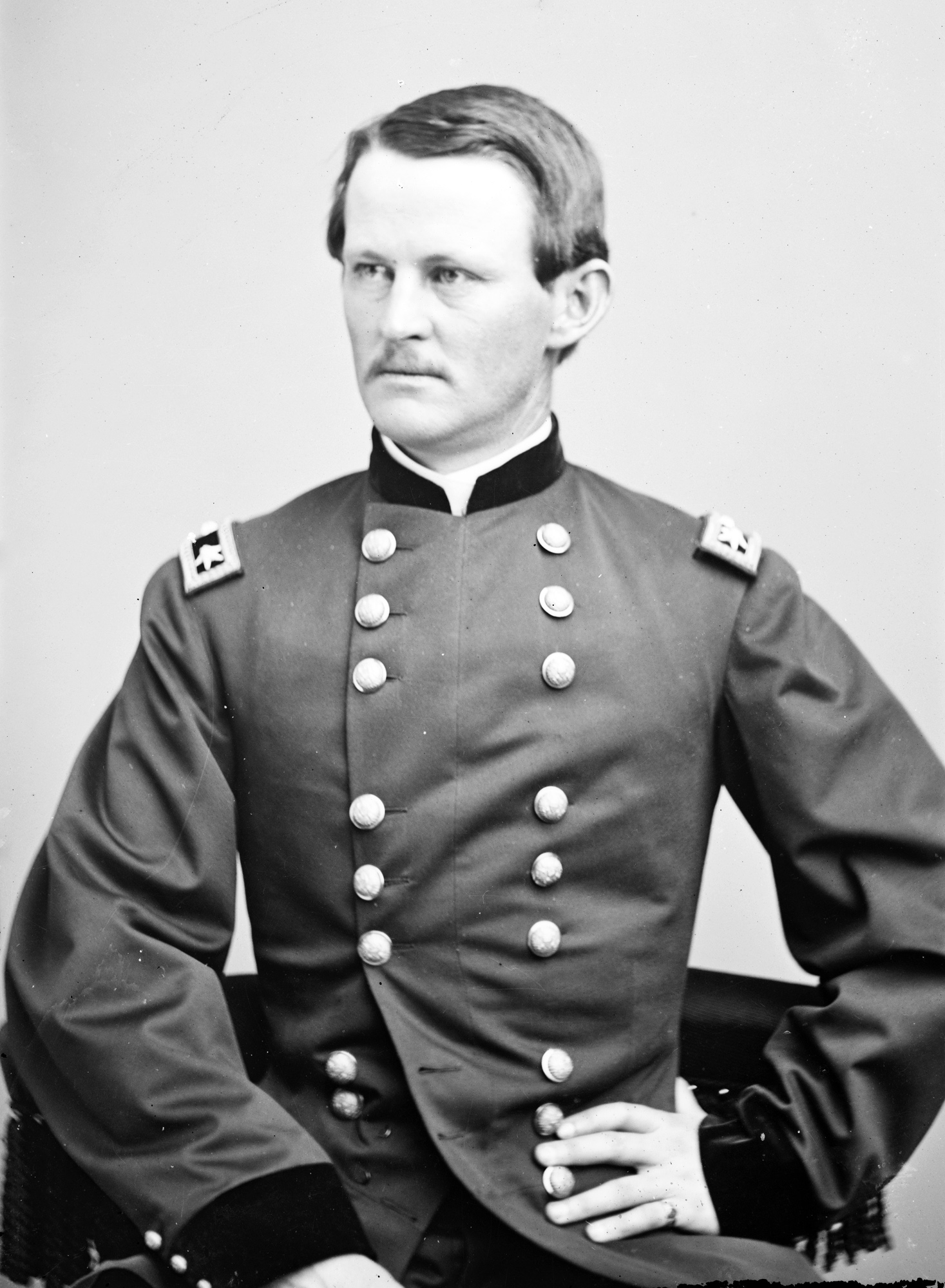
Major General Wesley Merritt. Photograph taken sometime between 1864 and 1866.

In 1862, Merritt was appointed captain in the 2nd Cavalry and served as an aide-de-camp to Brig. Gen. Philip St. George Cooke, who commanded the Cavalry Department of the Army of the Potomac. He served in the defenses of Washington, D.C., for the rest of 1862. In 1863, he was appointed adjutant for Maj. Gen. George Stoneman and participated in Stoneman's Raid in the Battle of Chancellorsville in 1863.

He was slightly wounded in the Battle of Brandy Station; on June 29, 1863, he was appointed brigadier general of volunteers for his "gallant and meritorious service" at Brandy Station and Upperville. Being promoted directly from captain to brigadier general was an unusual step, even for the Civil War, but Merritt shared this honor on that date with Captain Elon J. Farnsworth and Captain George Armstrong Custer.

In the Gettysburg campaign, Merritt commanded the Reserve Brigade, 1st Division, Cavalry Corps of the Army of the Potomac. In the initial cavalry actions of the Battle of Gettysburg, Merritt saw no action; his reserve brigade guarded the lines of communications of the Army of the Potomac. On July 3, 1863, however, he participated in the assault ordered by division commander Brig. Gen. Judson Kilpatrick on the Confederate right flank, following Pickett's Charge. His fellow general, Elon J. Farnsworth, was killed during this futile assault against infantry troops. Merritt took over command of the 1st Division of the Cavalry Corps following the death by typhoid fever of its commander, John Buford, in December 1863. Brig. Gen. Alfred Torbert was the initial commander of the 1st Division but was absent ill for most of Lt. Gen. Ulysses S. Grant's Overland Campaign in 1864, so Merritt acted as commander in his place. He received a brevet promotion to lieutenant colonel in the regular army for his actions at the Battle of Yellow Tavern, the engagement in which Confederate cavalry commander Maj. Gen. J.E.B. Stuart was killed.

During Maj. Gen. Philip Sheridan's Valley Campaigns of 1864, Merritt commanded the 1st Division, Cavalry Corps of the Army of the Shenandoah. Arriving at the opportune moment, his division routed the Confederate forces at the Third Battle of Winchester, a deed for which he received a brevet promotion to major general of the volunteers. Upon his return his Cavalry was deployed across the valley, burning, destroying or taking away everything of value or likely to become of value to the enemy. October 5 his division alone destroyed from Port Republic to Toms Brook 630 barns, 47 mills, 410,742 bushels of wheat, 515 acres of corn not counting private homes. He was second-in-command to Sheridan during the Appomattox Campaign and was one of several commissioners for the surrender at Appomattox Court House. He was brevetted major general in the regular army, in April 1865, for bravery at the Battle of Five Forks and the Appomattox Campaign.

In June 1865, Merritt was appointed command of Cavalry Forces of the Military Division of the Southwest, commanded by Sheridan. He led the 1st Division of Cavalry to march from Shreveport, Louisiana, to San Antonio, Texas, as part of the Union occupation forces on an arduous 33-day 600-mile march between July 9 and August 11, 1865. On January 28, 1866, Merritt was one of a number of brevetted generals mustered out of volunteer service and returned to their pre-war ranks in the regular army.

== Frontier duty and West Point ==
After the war's end, Merritt continued to serve in the cavalry along the frontier. He was appointed lieutenant colonel of the newly raised U.S. 9th Cavalry on July 28, 1866, and in July 1867 was sent to command Fort Davis, Texas, garrisoned by six of the regiment's companies. He was made colonel of the 5th Cavalry on July 1, 1876, which he commanded in the Battle of Slim Buttes during the American Indian Wars.

As colonel of the 5th Cavalry, Merritt was a member of the court of inquiry which first sat on January 13, 1879, presided over by Colonel John H. King of the 9th Infantry, which was convened to consider the behavior of Major Marcus A. Reno of the 7th Cavalry at the Battle of the Little Bighorn (June 25 to 26, 1876); which resulted in the death of General George Armstrong Custer and over 200 men of the 7th Cavalry.

He served on the frontier until being appointed superintendent of West Point, a post he filled from 1882 to 1887. In April 1887, he was appointed brigadier general in the Regular Army.

After departing West Point, Merritt was made commander of the Department of the Missouri. In 1889, ahead of Land Rush of 1889 (a land run in the Oklahoma Territory), Merritt received orders to send troops into the Oklahoma District in order to enforce order in the absence a civilian government authorities. Merritt traveled by train to the district several days before the land run in order to inspect Army camps in Oklahoma City and Guthrie. He issued a report in September 1889 in which credited the presence of troops as playing a major role in maintaining peace during the land run.

Merritt was a companion of the Illinois Commandery of the Military Order of the Loyal Legion of the United States.

== Spanish–American War ==
Merritt served as commanding general of the first Philippine expedition during the Spanish-American War.

After Commodore Dewey's Asiatic Squadron destroyed Rear Admiral Patricio Montojo's Spanish Pacific Squadron at the Battle of Manila Bay on May 1, 1898, the United States began to organize ground forces to attack and capture the city of Manila. Merritt was placed in command of the newly created Eighth Army Corps. In June 1898, Merritt and the available troops of the corps departed from San Francisco for the Philippines.

When Merritt arrived in Manila, he and Dewey made preparations for the attack on the city. The two intentionally kept Emilio Aguinaldo in the dark about the plans for the attack because the Americans did not want Aguinaldo's forces to end up in control of the city. Merritt and Dewey made arrangements with Governor General Fermín Jáudenes, commander of the Spanish garrison, to surrender the city to the American forces after the latter put up a token resistance. The city fell to the Americans on August 13, 1898, and Merritt became the first American military governor of the Philippines. Merritt was relieved by Major General Elwell Stephen Otis on August 30 to advise the United States delegation in the peace negotiations leading to the Treaty of Paris.

Based on his Spanish–American War service, Merritt became a member of the Pennsylvania Commandery of the Military Order of Foreign Wars.

Merritt retired from the army in 1900.

== Family and death ==
Merritt was married twice. His first wife was Caroline Warren Merritt, who died on June 12, 1893, at the age of 44. She is buried at West Point Cemetery. Merritt's second wife was Laura Williams Caton, daughter of John D. Caton, whom he met in the late 1890s, when she was in her mid-twenties. General Merritt and Laura Williams were married in London on October 24, 1898.

Meritt died from complications of arteriosclerosis in Natural Bridge, Virginia, at the age of 74, on December 3, 1910. He is buried at West Point Cemetery.

== Portrayal in the media ==
- Portrayed by Greg Dorris in the Filipino film, Heneral Luna (2015).

== See also ==
- List of American Civil War generals (Union)

Military offices
Preceded by Oliver Otis Howard	Superintendent of the United States Military Academy; 1882–1887	Succeeded by John G. Parke
Government offices
Preceded by None (post created August 14, 1898)	Military Governor of the Philippines; August 14–29, 1898	Succeeded by Elwell S. Otis
