= 1st Signal Brigade =

1st Signal Brigade may refer to:

- 1st Signal Brigade (United Kingdom)
- 1st Signal Brigade (United States)

== See also ==
- 1st Brigade (disambiguation)
