= Operators of the NHIndustries NH-90 =

This article summarises the operators, and the delivery status of the NH90.

== Operators ==
=== Summary ===
Operators		Assembled by	NH-90 ordered (by variant)				NH-90 delivered (by variant)				Sold [–] / Bought [+]	Retired	Losses	In service	Notes
Country	Force	Assembled by	TTH	NFH	SF	Total	TTH	NFH	SF	Total	Sold [–] / Bought [+]	Retired	Losses	In service	Notes
Australia	Australian Army Aviation Corps	Airbus Helicopters Australia	41	—	—	47	41	—	—	47	—	41	—	0	1 offered to the Australian Army as compensations for delays. Retired in 2023.
Australia	Fleet Air Arm (RAN)	Airbus Helicopters Australia	6	—	—	47	6	—	—	47	—	5	1	0	1 offered to the Australian Army as compensations for delays. Retired in 2023.
Belgium	Belgian Air Force	Airbus Helicopters France	4	—	—	8	4	—	—	8	—	4	—	4	
Belgium	Belgian Navy	Airbus Helicopters France	—	4	—	8	—	4	—	8	—	—	—	4	
Finland	Finnish Army Aviation	Patria and Airbus Helicopters France	20	—	—	20	20	—	—	20	—	—	—	20	
France	Armée de terre	Airbus Helicopters France	63	—	18	108	63	—	1	91	—	—	1	90	
France	Marine nationale	Airbus Helicopters France	—	27	—	108	—	27	—	91	—	—	—	90	
Germany	German Air Force	Airbus Helicopters Germany	82	—	—	131	82	—	—	101	—	—	—	101	
Germany	Marineflieger	Airbus Helicopters Germany	—	49	—	131	—	19	—	101	—	—	—	101	
Greece	Hellenic Army Aviation	Airbus Helicopters France	20	—	—	20	16	—	—	16	—	—	—	16	
Italy	Italian Army	AgustaWestland Italy	60	—	—	116	60	—	—	116	—	—	1	114	
Italy	Italian Navy	AgustaWestland Italy	10	46	—	116	—	56	—	116	—	—	1	114	
Netherlands	Royal Netherlands Air and Space Force	AgustaWestland Italy	—	23	—	23	—	20	—	20	—	—	1	19	3 ordered in December 2025
New Zealand	Royal New Zealand Air Force	Airbus Helicopters France	9	—	—	9	9	—	—	9	—	1	—	8	1 used for spare parts
Norway	Royal Norwegian Navy	AgustaWestland Italy	—	14	—	14	—	14	—	14	—	14	—	0	
Oman	Royal Air Force of Oman	Airbus Helicopters France	20	—	—	20	20	—	—	20	—	—	2	18	
Spain	Spanish Army	Airbus Helicopters France	39	—	—	76	17	—	—	25	—	—	—	25	Batch 1: 22 NH-90: Army: 16; Air Force: 6; Batch 2: 23 NH-90: Army: 10; Air Force: 6; Navy: 7; Batch 3: 31 NH-90: Army: 13; Air Force: 12; Navy: 6
Spain	Spanish Air Force	Airbus Helicopters France	24	—	—	76	6	—	—	25	—	—	—	25	Batch 1: 22 NH-90: Army: 16; Air Force: 6; Batch 2: 23 NH-90: Army: 10; Air Force: 6; Navy: 7; Batch 3: 31 NH-90: Army: 13; Air Force: 12; Navy: 6
Spain	Spanish Navy	Airbus Helicopters France	—	13	—	76	2	—	—	25	—	—	—	25	Batch 1: 22 NH-90: Army: 16; Air Force: 6; Batch 2: 23 NH-90: Army: 10; Air Force: 6; Navy: 7; Batch 3: 31 NH-90: Army: 13; Air Force: 12; Navy: 6
Qatar	Qatar Emiri Air Force	Leonardo and Airbus Helicopters France	16	12	—	28	9	9	—	18	—	—	—	18	
Sweden	Swedish Air Force	Airbus Helicopters France and Germany	18	—	—	18	18	—	—	18	—	—	—	18	14E operated for the Army and Air Force, 14F operated for the navy
TOTAL			432	188	18	638	373	149	1	523	0	61	7	453	

Retired

== Potential sales ==
=== Saudi Arabia (20 NH-90 NFH) ===
The Italian government is negotiating a government-to-government contract with Saudi Arabia for the sale of around 20 NH-90 NFH.

=== Vietnam ===
In September 2026, French President Emmanuel Macron announced that Vietnam was finalizing a 2025 letter of intention to procure three NH90 with Airbus Helicopters. The variant was undisclosed, even though the context referred maritime security.
