= 1st Guards Rocket Brigade =

- Active: 1920–present
- Country: Soviet Union (until 1991); Russia
- Branch: Soviet Army (until 1991); Russian Ground Forces
- Type: Rocket artillery
- Size: Brigade
- Part of: 49th Combined Arms Army
- Garrison/HQ: Goryachy Klyuch, Krasnodar Krai
- Nickname: Orshanskaya
- Equipment: 9K720 Iskander
- Engagements: World War II: Battle of Orsha; Russo-Georgian War; Russian invasion of Ukraine
- Decorations: Order of Kutuzov 2nd Class; Order of Suvorov 2nd Class
- Honorifics: Orsha

The 1st Guards Orshanskaya Orders of Suvorov and Kutuzov Rocket Brigade (Military Unit Number 31853) is a missile formation of the Russian Ground Forces, based in Goryachy Klyuch, Krasnodar Krai. It is part of the 49th Combined Arms Army of the Southern Military District.

== Origins and Second World War ==
The brigade traces its history to July 1920. That year, a heavy artillery divizion was formed, which became part of the 48th Rifle Division. Later it was reorganized into a cannon artillery regiment and then into the 14th Guards Heavy Cannon Artillery Brigade on June 25, 1943, as part of the 4th Guards Heavy Cannon Artillery Division. The regiment received its baptism of fire at the village of Vainikola in June 1941.

In July 1943, for showing courage in the battles against the Nazi invaders the brigade was ranged among the Guards. A year later, in July 1944, for the capture of Orsha, an important railway junction, 14th Guards Heavy Cannon Artillery Brigade was given the honorary name "Orsha". On February 19, 1945, by the Decree of the Supreme Soviet of the USSR, the brigade was awarded the Order of Kutuzov 2nd degree for the exemplary performance of combat missions. May 17, 1945 for its heroism during the capture of the fortress of Konigsberg the brigade was awarded the Order of Suvorov.

== 1946-1991 ==
Until 1960, the brigade remained the 14th Guards Cannon Artillery Brigade. In 1960 the 114th Guards Rocket Brigade was activated at Dolgorukovo, Kaliningrad Oblast, with SS-1 Scud missiles. In the last years of the Soviet Union, the brigade was designated the 114th Guards Rocket Brigade and was at Borne-Sulinovo in Poland, part of Northern Group of Forces.

== 1991- Russian Federation ==
After the fall of the Soviet Union, the brigade is listed as serving with 67th Army Corps in the Caucasus, circa 2000. In 2000, the brigade had 310 personnel in Tochka. In August 2008, the brigade took part in the war in South Ossetia. 2009: 12 Tochka-U. In 2011 4 Iskander launchers were delivered. 09.2012 Kavkaz-2012, launched Iskander. Total: 12 9K720 Iskander.
