= Maurice-Arthur-Alphonse Wemaere =

Maurice-Arthur-Alphonse Wemaere (1879-1956) was a French general who commanded the French 1st Cavalry Brigade from 1935 to 1936. During World War II he commanded the 85th African Infantry Division.
