= 1st Mechanised Brigade =

1st Mechanised Brigade may refer to:

- 1st Mechanised Brigade (France)
- 1st Mechanized Brigade (Romania)
- 1st Mechanized Brigade (Slovakia)
- 1st Mechanised Brigade (United Kingdom)
- 1st Heavy Mechanized Brigade, Ukraine

== See also ==
- 1st Mechanized Infantry Brigade (disambiguation)
- 1st Brigade (disambiguation)
