= Vera Krylova =

Soviet Komsomol activist (1920 – 1951)

- Krylova in 1942
- Native name: Вера Петровна Крылова
- Born: 1920; Kainsk, RSFSR
- Died: 1951; Krasnoyarsk, USSR
- Allegiance: Soviet Union
- Service / branch: Red Army
- Rank: Major
- Awards: Order of the Red Banner; Order of the Red Banner of Labour

Vera Petrovna Krylova (Russian: Вера Петровна Крылова; 1920 – 1951) was a Soviet Komsomol activist, military officer, and gulag detainee who used her political connections to Soviet leadership to initiate the creation of the 1st Separate Women's Volunteer Rifle Brigade. However, she was arrested on charges of treason soon after the unit's founding. Sources differ as to the grounds of the allegations and her exact fate afterwards, but she was not rehabilitated.

== Early life ==
Krylova was born in 1920 to a Russian family in the Novosibirsk Oblast. After completing school she worked as the head of an education unit in an orphanage in Tatarsk before she was fired in 1941 for expressing concerns about how the facility was run. Outraged by the situation, she petitioned Stalin, and her complaints were passed on to Andrey Andreyev, the Supreme Soviet Deputy in Russia from Novosibirsk. Eventually she was reinstated and awarded the Order of the Red Banner of Labour for her diligence.

== World War II ==
After the German invasion of the Soviet Union, Krylova volunteered for the front as a medic. Assigned to the 586th Rifle Regiment, she participated in the battles near the villages of Yelnya. For helping evacuate 49 wounded soldiers with their weapons from an encirclement near the Andreevsk-Pesochnaya area on 13 October 1941 she was awarded the Order of the Red Banner and received significant publicity in Soviet media. Later she was wounded by two mine explosions during a battle in December – despite her injuries, she continued to fight off an enemy attack, throwing a grenade to take out a machine gun, saving several of her comrades. During a conversation with Lidiya Seifullina in October 1942 she expressed her desire to create female infantry units, resulting in Seifullina starting to write a book about her military feats and writing to Stalin requesting that he meet with Krylova. Later that month she met with Stalin, resulting in the creation of the Women's Rifle Brigade she dreamt of via State Defense Committee Resolution No GFCS-2470SS. Colonel Kovalenko was appointed commander of the brigade, while Krylova was promoted to the rank of major and made deputy head for combat units of the brigade.

Various problems arose throughout training of the volunteers, including several pregnancies, suicides, desertions, in addition to low morale due to the poor conditions. Krylova began to question how useful the brigades would be on the front, and expressed concern that women soldiers would be captured and used for propaganda. Nevertheless, the brigade was transferred to the NKVD in November 1943. That month she was arrested on charges of treason; the exact reason and grounds of the charges remain disputed, with allegations against her ranging from tricking Soviet leadership into creating a unit unfit for battle to collaborating with Germans by transmitting military information to them over a radio and enable an ambush. Either way, she was sentenced to three years in labor camps under article 169 of the RSFSR, although the complete documents about her case remain classified. Some sources mistakenly claimed she was shot, despite later accounts from her family that she died of an illness in Krasnoyarsk in 1951. Some members of her brigade believed she was a traitor, while others doubted the allegations. Regardless, the brigade was disbanded in 1944, with personnel being reassigned to other military units or non-combat support work. Due to her arrest, Seifullina's book about Krylova was never printed, and Seifullina's works weren't published for the rest of her life. Krylova went from fame to complete obscurity, not written about until a 1998 article in the regional newspaper "Trudovaya zhizn" (Трудовая жизнь) was released.
