= 1st Air Defense Brigade =

Unit of the Republic of Korea Army

- 제1방공여단
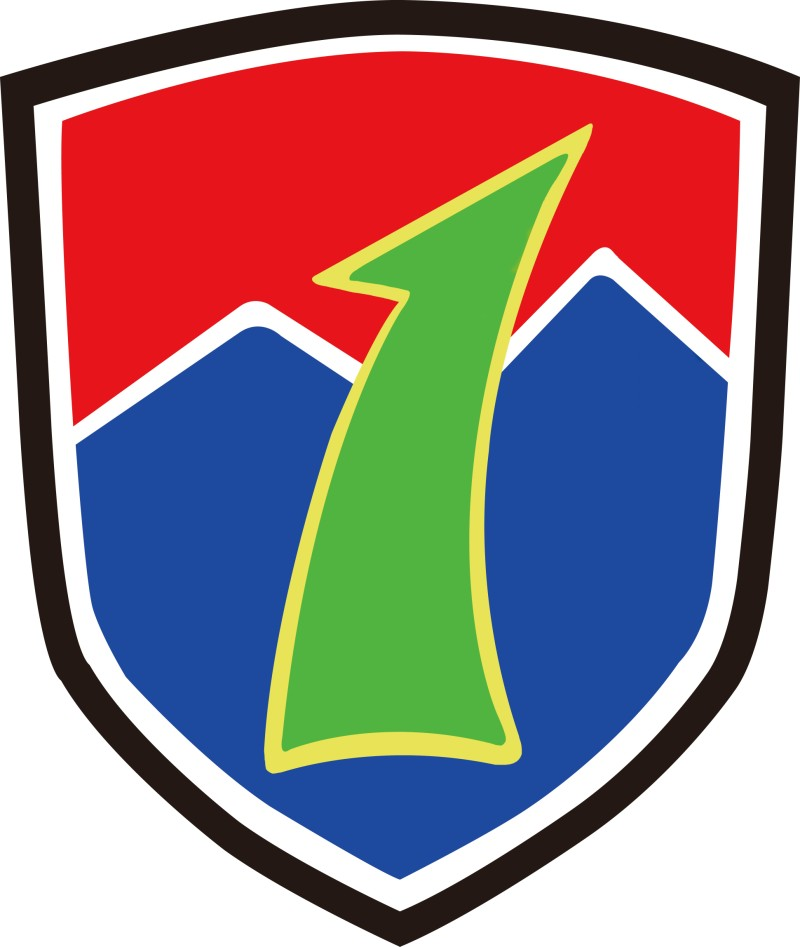
- Emblem of the Brigade.
- Active: 1 December 1986 – present
- Country: South Korea
- Branch: Republic of Korea Army
- Type: Air defense
- Role: Control and defense of low-altitude air defense zones in the Seoul area
- Size: Brigade
- Part of: Capital Defense Command
- Garrison/HQ: Gwacheon, Gyeonggi Province
- Nickname: Sol-gae unit
- Equipment: Cannon, Surface-to-air missile

Commanders
- Current commander: Brig. Gen. Lee Gyeong-ju

The 1st Air Defense Brigade (Korean: 제1방공여단, Hanja: 第一防空旅團) is a military formation of the Republic of Korea Army. It is subordinated to the Capital Defense Command(수도방위사령부). It headquartered in Gwacheon, Gyeonggi Province, and is responsible for defending the P-73A and P-73B areas of Seoul, the South Korean capital city.

== History ==
On 1 December 1986, the unit were established as 3rd Air Defense Brigade. The 3rd Air Defense Brigade was reorganized into the 1st Air Defense Brigade after being left with the Army when the Air Defense Command transferred to the Republic of Korea Air Force on 1 July 1991. After that, the brigade was under the command of the Third ROK Army, and on 1 December 2011, it was merged with the 10th Air Defense Group and transferred to the Capital Defense Command.

== Organization ==
- Headquarters (Gwacheon)
  - Maintenance unit
  - Airspace control company
  - Signal company
- 501st Air Defense Battalion
- 503rd Air Defense Battalion
- 505th Air Defense Battalion
- 507th Air Defense Battalion

== Equipment ==
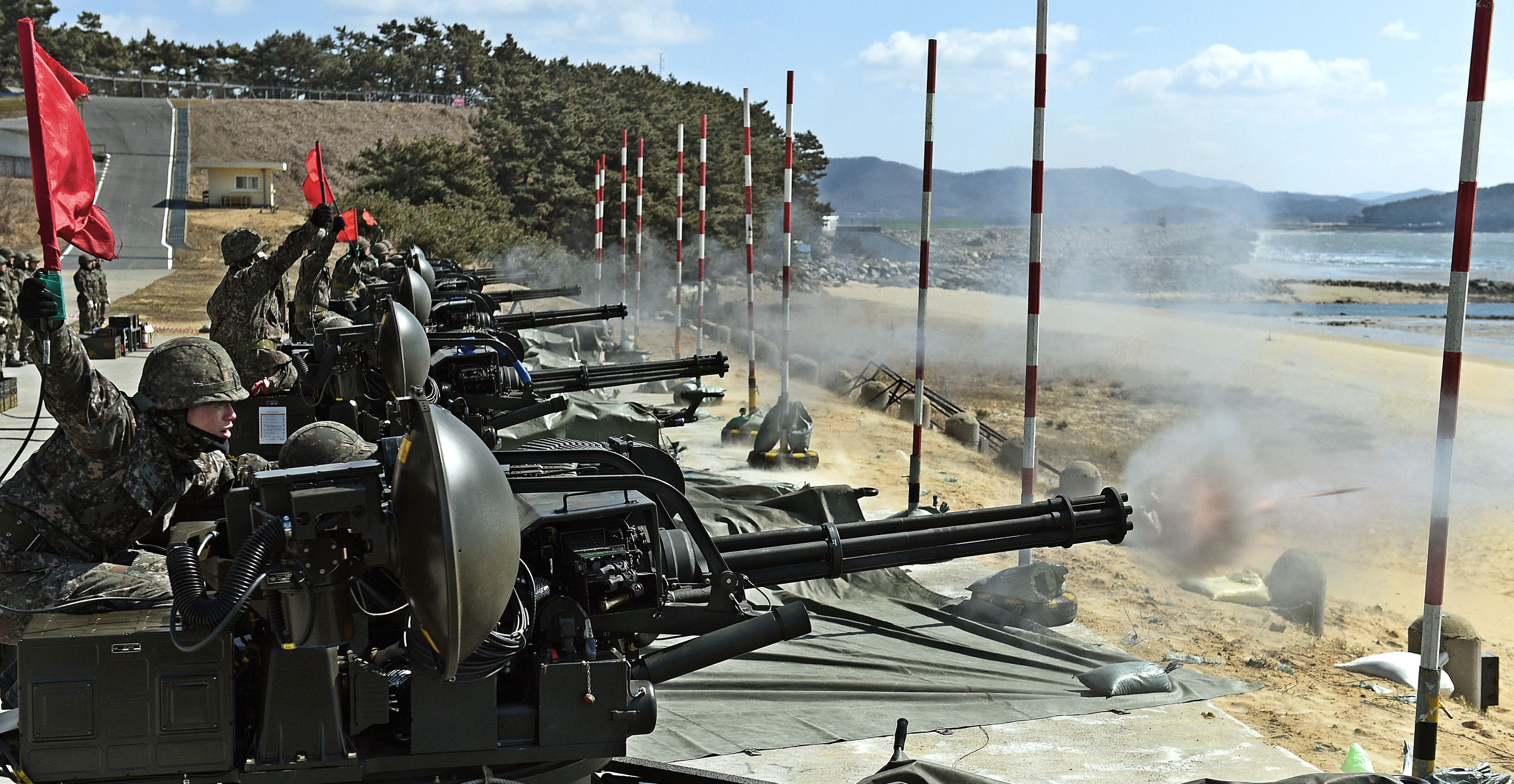
1st Air Defense Brigade exercising with KM167A3.

- Mistral
- KM167A3
- K-SAM Pegasus
- KP-SAM Shingung
- Oerlikon GDF
- Low altitude detection radar
