= Hellenic Army Aviation =

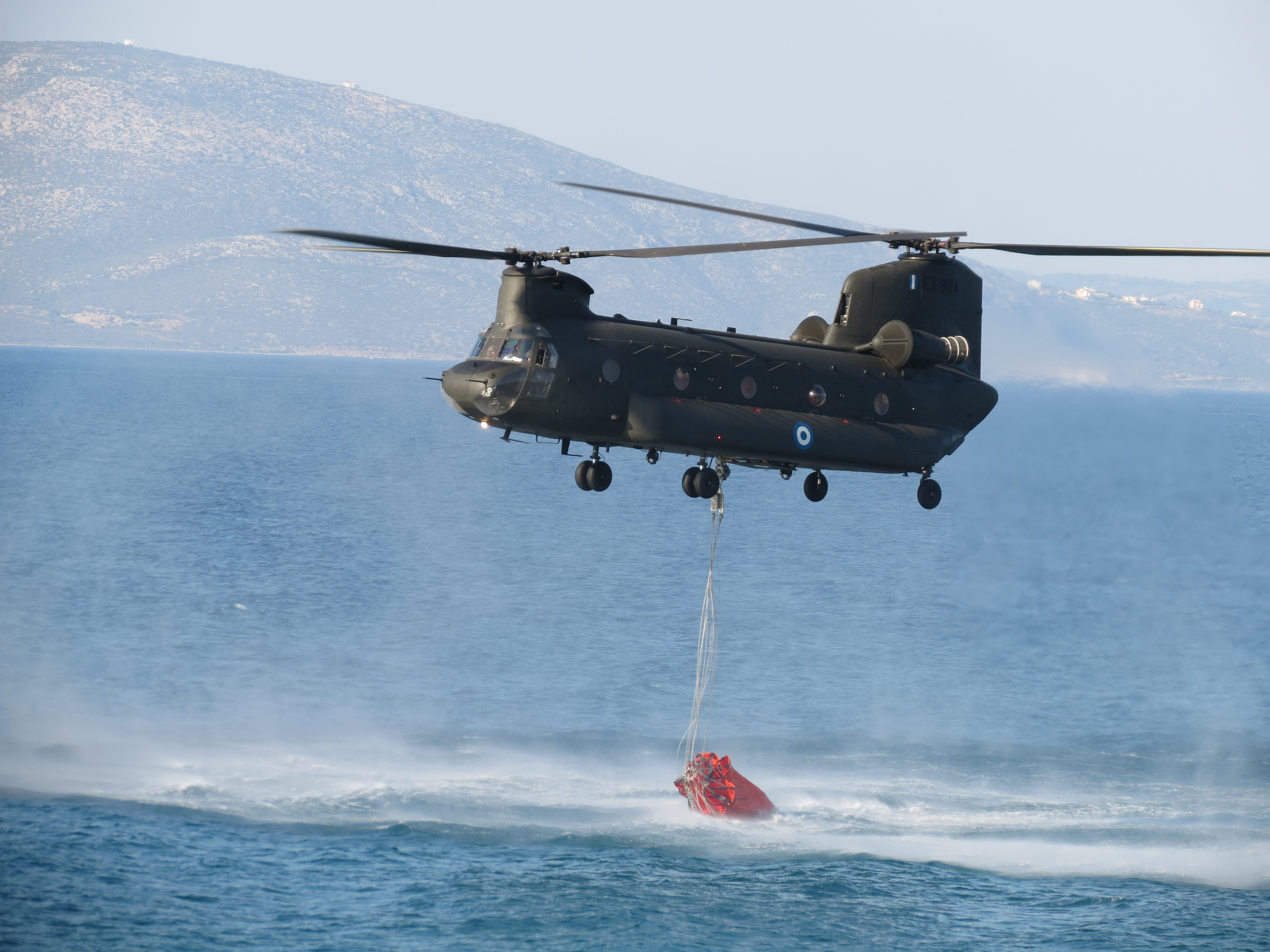
Chinook CH-47D of the Hellenic Army Aviation loading water during the Kalamos fire of August 2017

The Army Aviation (Greek: Αεροπορία Στρατού) is the army aviation branch of the Greek Armed Forces. Originally established in 1947 with light artillery spotter and liaison aircraft, the acquisition of transport helicopters from 1969 and especially of the AH-64 Apache attack helicopters in the early 1990s changed the role of the service, which was recognized as the sixth arm of the Hellenic Army in 1996. The service is headed by the Army Aviation Directorate (Διεύθυνση Αεροπορίας Στρατού) within the Hellenic Army General Staff, and comprises the Army Aviation School (Σχολή Αεροπορίας Στρατού) and the 1st Army Aviation Brigade (1η Ταξιαρχία Αεροπορίας Στρατού, 1η ΤΑΞΑΣ).
