= 1st Logistics Brigade =

Logistics brigade of the Romanian Land Forces

The 1st Logistics Brigade "Prahova" (Brigada 1 Logistică "Prahova") is a logistics brigade currently belonging to the Romanian Land Forces and it is subordinated to the 1st Infantry Division. It was formed on 1 February 2001 and its headquarters are located in Ploieşti.

== Structure ==
- 1st Logistics Brigade - Ploieşti
  - 1st Transport Battalion
  - 5th Medical Battalion
  - 102nd Maintenance Battalion
