= 1st Armored Brigade (South Korea) =

Unit of the Republic of Korea Army

- 제1기갑여단
- Unit insignia
- Active: 1968 – present
- Country: South Korea
- Branch: Republic of Korea Army
- Type: Armored
- Size: Brigade
- Part of: V Corps
- Garrison/HQ: Pocheon, Gyeonggi Province
- Nickname(s): 전격 (Jeon-Gyeok / Blitz)
- Motto(s): Maneuver! Until the decisive moment!

Commanders
- Current commander: Brig. Gen. Lee Yeong-Gyu

The 1st Armored Brigade (Korean: 제1기갑여단) is a military formation of the Republic of Korea Army. The brigade is subordinated to the V Corps.

== History ==
The headquarters of the 1st Armored Brigade Command was used by the 7th Infantry Division, USFK (Camp Kaiser). Camp Kaiser withdrew and the brigade took over the site on 25 May 1977.

== Organization ==
- Headquarters:
  - Headquarters Company
  - Air Defense Artillery Battery (K30)
  - Armored Engineer Company
  - Chemical Company
  - Armored Reconnaissance Company (K1E1, K200)
  - Signal Company
  - Support Company
  - Intelligence Company
- 5th Armored Battalion (K1E1)
- 15th Armored Battalion (K1E1)
- 19th Armored Battalion (K1E1)
- 105th Mechanized Infantry Battalion (K200A1)
- 138th Mechanized Infantry Battalion (K200A1)
- 628th Artillery Battalion (K55A1)
- 888th Artillery Battalion (K9A1)
