= 1st Separate Women's Volunteer Rifle Brigade =

The 1st Separate Women's Volunteer Rifle Brigade was an independent brigade of the Soviet Union military created from the order of the State Defense Committee Resolution No GFCS-2470SS in 1942. Originally part of the Red Army, the unit was transferred to the NKVD in 1943 after the arrest of its deputy combat commander, Major Vera Krylova. In 1944 the brigade was disbanded.
