= 1st Guards Engineer Brigade =

1st Guards Brest-Berlin Red Banner Orders of Suvorov and Kutuzov Engineer Brigade
- 1-я гвардейская инженерно-сапёрная Брестско-Берлинская Краснознамённая, орденов Суворова и Кутузова бригада
- Active: 2014-present
- Country: Russia
- Branch: Russian Ground Forces
- Size: Brigade
- Part of: Moscow Military District
- Garrison/HQ: Murom, Vladimir Oblast
- Decorations: Order of the Red Banner; Order of Suvorov; Order of Kutuzov

Commanders
- Current commander: Colonel Kamil S. Salimkhanov

The 1st Guards Brest-Berlin Red Banner Orders of Suvorov and Kutuzov Engineer Brigade (Russian: 1-я гвардейская инженерно-сапёрная Брестско-Берлинская Краснознамённая, орденов Суворова и Кутузова бригада) (Military Unit Number 11105) is a military formation of the Russian Federation. It was formed on December 1, 2014, and is based in Murom, Vladimir Oblast.

Equipment of the unit includes specialized engineering systems such as UR-77 Meteorit, BMR-3, IMR-3M and GMZ-3.

== History ==
The unit is the successor to the Soviet 16th Special Purpose Engineer Brigade formed in 1942. This unit was later reformed as the 1st Guards Motorized Brigade in 1943 and then again as the 1st Guards Motor Engineer Brigade in 1945. In 1998 it was renamed and downsized to the 8th Guards Engineer Regiment only to be disbanded in the early 2000s. In 2014 the 1st Guards Engineer Brigade was formed in its current shape.

During the Russian Invasion of Ukraine the unit took part of hostilities since the initial phase of the invasion. It was subject to a Ukrainian missile attack on May 28, 2023, and at least 9 servicemen of the unit are reported to have been killed.

As of 2015, the unit commander is Colonel Kamil S. Salimkhanov.
