= 1st Assault Brigade Royal Engineers =

WW2 British Army unit

- Active: 1943–1945
- Country: United Kingdom
- Branch: British Army
- Type: Engineers
- Role: Armoured Engineers
- Size: Brigade
- Part of: 79th Armoured Division
- Engagements: Operation Overlord; Operation Infatuate; Operation Blackcock; Operation Plunder

The 1st Assault Brigade Royal Engineers was a specialised armoured formation of the British Army active in the Second World War. It was formed in mid-1943 and its structure was three assault regiments of the Royal Engineers. It was assigned to the 79th Armoured Division in preparation for the Normandy invasion of 6 June 1944. The unit comprised armoured vehicles modified for specialist roles (also known as Hobart's Funnies), intended to assist with the landing phase of the operation.

== History ==
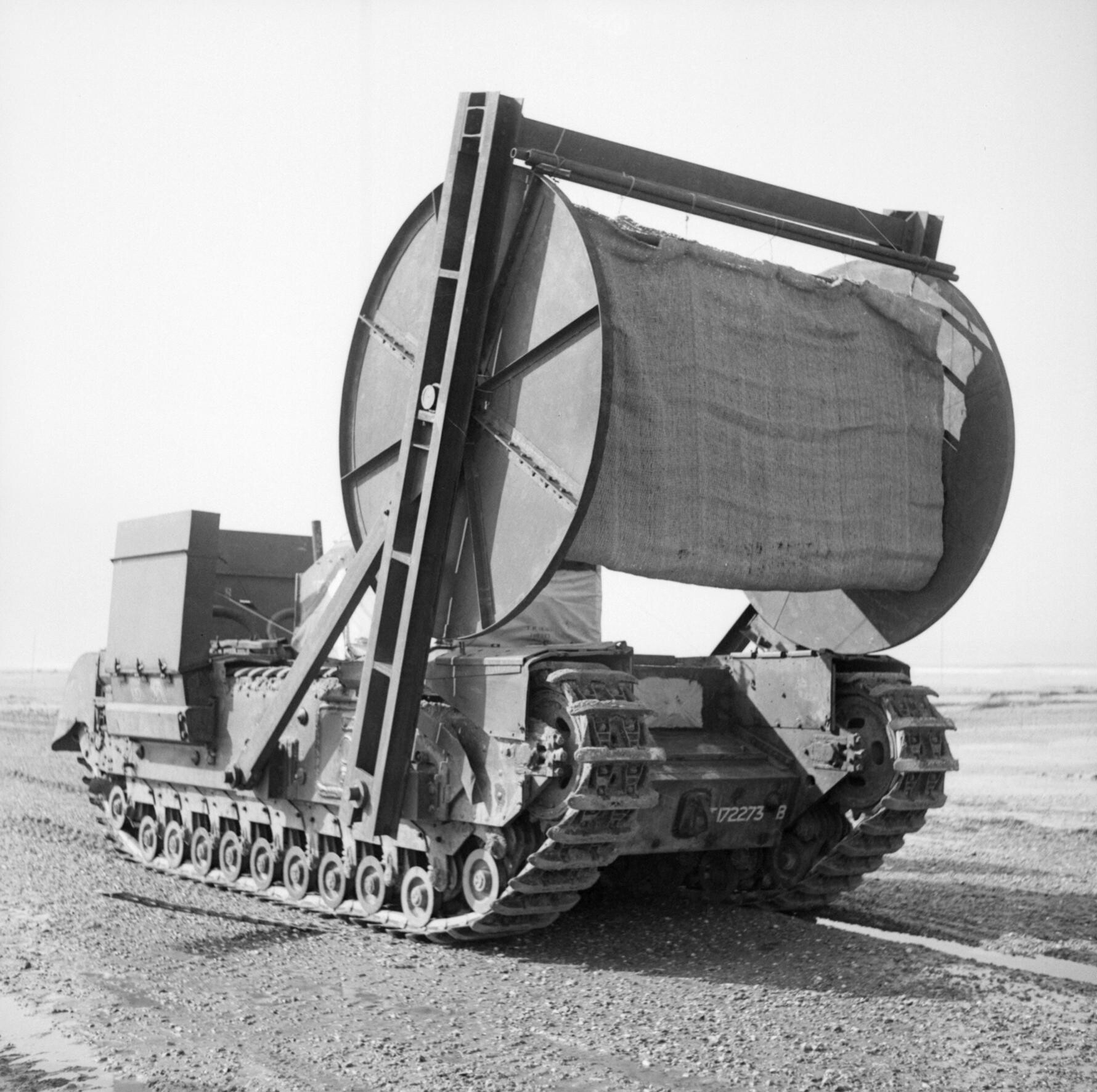
Churchill AVRE with a bobbin.

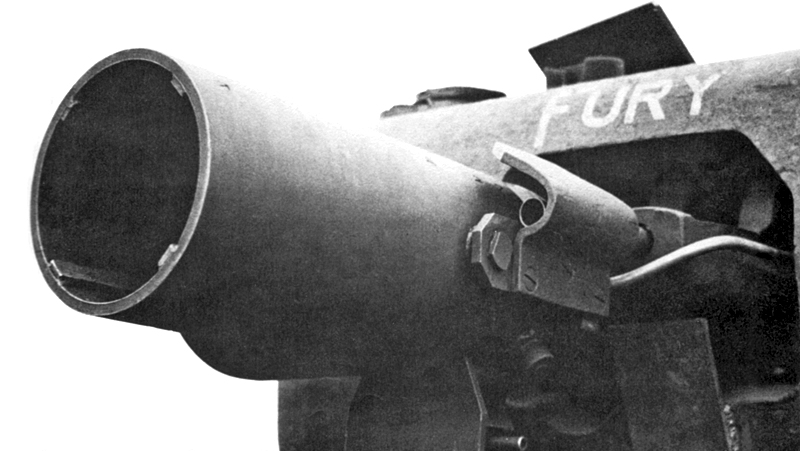
Close-up of an AVRE's Petard Mortar.

By the end of October 1943, various engineer units had been renamed and transferred into the Brigade. This brigade comprised 3 Assault Regiments, each with 4 Assault Squadrons, plus an Assault Park Squadron. This structure remained unchanged up to the Normandy landings in June 1944.

The basic vehicle of the assault unit was the Assault Vehicle Royal Engineers (AVREs). This was a Churchill tank with its turret modified or removed and to which were attached certain special equipments.

The Brigade was employed during the assault landings in Normandy, Operation Overlord and further used during the battle for the Roer Triangle (Operation Blackcock), the Rhine crossings (Operation Plunder) and the Elbe crossing.

== D-Day, Operation Overlord ==
Each of the three Infantry Divisions involved in the first assault on the British and Canadian front - Gold Beach, Juno Beach and Sword Beach - included two Assault Squadrons from 5 Assault Regiment and 6 Assault Regiment, Royal Engineers.

The objective of each pair of Assault Squadrons was to clear lanes across the beaches and to establish up to eight exits from the beaches onto the first inland road, suitable for tracked vehicles. This involved:

- removing beach obstacles, which were exposed at low tide, so that they were not a hazard as the tide rose.
- disarming and removing mines and other explosive charges from these obstacles
- breaching the sea wall, where one existed
- creating and maintaining ramps and firm access routes through the soft sand above the high water line
- removing knocked-out vehicles that were obstructing these exits

All this had to be done under fire from buildings on the seafront, and under mortar and artillery fire from further inland.

Each Assault Squadron was equipped with a number of Armoured Vehicles Royal Engineers (AVREs) - which were Churchill tanks, modified in various ways to suit the needs of Assault Engineers. In addition, the assault teams included a number of Sherman 'Crabs' from 30th Armoured Brigade - these were Sherman tanks, with a full-width, heavy duty, rotary chain flail mounted in front, which destroyed any mines in its path, thus clearing the lanes up the beach.

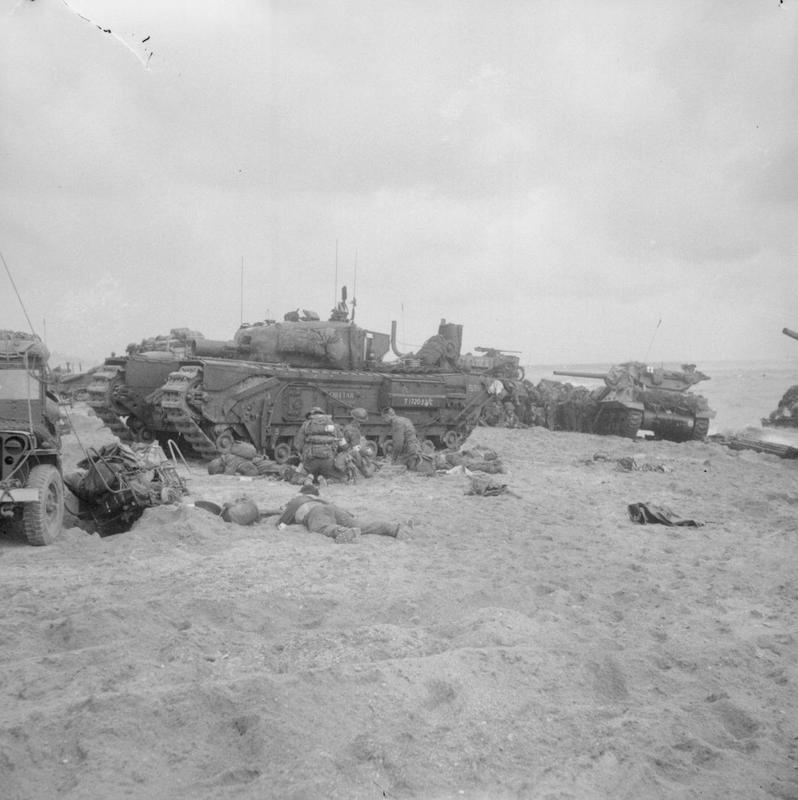
Medics are attending to wounded in the shelter of a Churchill AVRE from 5th Assault Regiment, Royal Engineers - Sword Beach, 6 June 1944

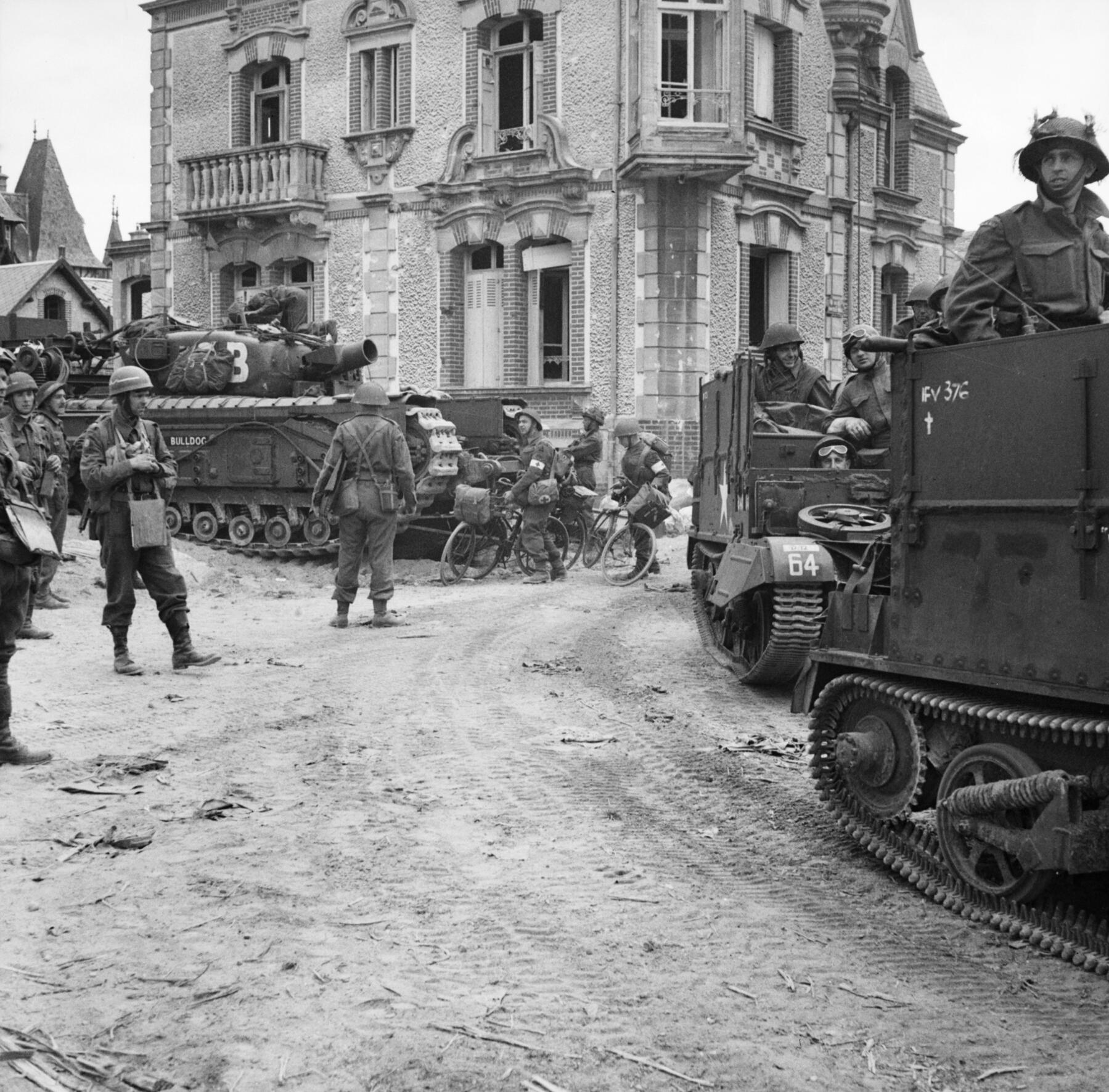
Universal carriers with deep wading screens pass through Lion sur Mer. A Churchill AVRE can be seen in the background, 6 June 1944.

The AVREs then turned their attention to the first line of land defences, using their spigot mortars, and with self-propelled guns providing artillery support. More Sappers landed to continue the clearance of the beaches. All the time, infantry were moving through into the growing bridgehead.

Several exits were open within an hour of the first landings, allowing the Armoured Brigades to start moving inland.

The Assault Regiments suffered their share of casualties. In some sectors, up to 50% of the flail tanks, AVREs and armoured bulldozers had been knocked out, with high casualties among the crews. But many of the objectives for D-Day had been achieved, which may not have been the case without 1st Assault Brigade R.E.

After Normandy, the Brigade was used in Operation Blackcock, Operation Infatuate and Operation Plunder.

== Assault Engineers after the War ==
=== Disbanding of 1st Assault Brigade ===
After the end of the Second World War, 79th Armoured Division was disbanded in August 1945. The remaining Assault Engineer Regiment was disbanded in July 1957.

=== Reformation as 32 Armoured Engineer Regiment ===
The unit was briefly reformed as 32 Armoured Engineer Regiment in 1964 before a further reorganisation in 1969 reduced the Armoured Engineers to one squadron.

In 1980, 32 Armoured Engineer Regiment was again reformed and was the largest tank regiment in the British Army. The Regiment was the only unit equipped with specialist Sapper tanks and heir to the traditions of past assault and armoured engineers. The regimental crest included the bull's head device of 79th Armoured Division.

32 Armoured Engineer Regiment had three squadrons each of four troops, a total of 72 tanks. Each troop had three AVREs and three AVLBs (bridge layers). These were more modern types, evolved from the original Churchill, but based on the newer Centurion and Chieftain tanks.

As of 2008, Engineer Regiments attached to Armoured or Mechanised Brigades in the British Army have Armoured Engineer Squadrons included within their organisation.

== Order of Battle ==
The Order of battle of the brigade during the war was: (day/month/year).

- 5th Assault Regiment, Royal Engineers 26/11/43–22/4/45
  - 5th Armoured Engineer Regiment, Royal Engineers 23/4/45–14/7/45
- 6th Assault Regiment, Royal Engineers 26/11/43–22/4/45
  - 6th Armoured Engineer Regiment, Royal Engineers 26/11/43-24/4/45
- 42nd Assault Regiment, Royal Engineers 26/11/43–22/4/45
  - 42nd Armoured Engineer Regiment, Royal Engineers 26/11/43–12/4/45
- 87th Assault Dozer Squadron, Royal Engineers 1/3/45–22/4/45
- 149th Assault Park Squadron, Royal Engineers 18/1/45–22/4/45
  - 149th Armoured Engineer Park Squadron, Royal Engineers 23/4/45–12/7/45
- 557th Assault Training Establishment, Royal Engineers 8/1/45–23/4/45
  - 557th Armoured Engineer Training & Experimental Establishment 24/4/45–12/7/45

== Commanders ==
Commanding officers of the brigade included:

- Brigadier Geoffrey Lionel Watkinson 26/11/43–12/2/45
- (Acting) Lieutenant Colonel J. K. Sheppheard 12/2/45–18/2/45
- Brigadier Philip Saint Barbe Sydenham 18/2/45–30/7/45

== See also ==
- British Armoured formations of World War II

== See also ==
- List of British brigades of the Second World War
