= Goryachy Klyuch =

Goryachy Klyuch (Russian: Горячий Ключ) is the name of several inhabited localities in Russia.

== Modern localities ==
Urban localities

- Goryachy Klyuch, Krasnodar Krai, a town in Krasnodar Krai; 44°38′N 39°8′E

Rural localities

- Goryachy Klyuch, Irkutsky District, Irkutsk Oblast, a settlement in Irkutsky District of Irkutsk Oblast
- Goryachy Klyuch, Zalarinsky District, Irkutsk Oblast, a village in Zalarinsky District of Irkutsk Oblast
- Goryachy Klyuch, Omsk Oblast, a settlement in Druzhinsky Rural Okrug of Omsky District in Omsk Oblast

== Alternative names ==
- Goryachy Klyuch, alternative name of Talaya, an urban-type settlement in Khasynsky District of Magadan Oblast; 61°8′N 152°23′E
