= 1st Motorised Brigade (Hungary) =

Army

The 1st Motorised Brigade was a formation of the Royal Hungarian Army that participated in the Axis invasion of Yugoslavia during World War II.

== Organization ==
Structure of the brigade:

- Headquarters
- 1st Armoured Reconnaissance Battalion
- 1st Battalion, 1st Motorized Infantry Regiment
- 2nd Battalion, 1st Motorized Infantry Regiment
- 3rd Battalion, 1st Motorized Infantry Regiment
- 9th Bicycle Infantry Battalion
- 10th Bicycle Infantry Regiment
- 1st Motorized Artillery Battalion
- 1st Motorized Anti-Aircraft Battery
- 1st Motorized Engineer Company
- 1st Motorized Bridging Engineer Company
- 1st Motorized Signal Company
- 1st Motorized Traffic Control Signal Company
- 1st Motorized Brigade Service Regiment

== Commanders ==
- Brigade General Ödön Zay (1 Oct 1938 — 1 Mar 1940)
- Brigade General Jenö Major (1 Mar 1940 — 1 Nov 1941)
- Brigade General Gyözö Ankai-Anesini (1 Nov 1941 — 1 May 1942)
- Colonel Elemér Sáska (1 May 1942 — ? June 1942)
