= 1st Reserve Officers' Training Corps Brigade =

1st ROTC Brigade
- 1st ROTC Brigade Shoulder Insignia
- Active: Present
- Country: United States of America
- Allegiance: United States Army
- Branch: US Army Reserve
- Type: ROTC Brigade
- Role: Officer Training
- Size: Brigade
- Garrison/HQ: Fort Knox, Kentucky

Commanders
- Commander: COL Jason Wayne
- Command Sergeant Major: CSM Adin Salkanovic

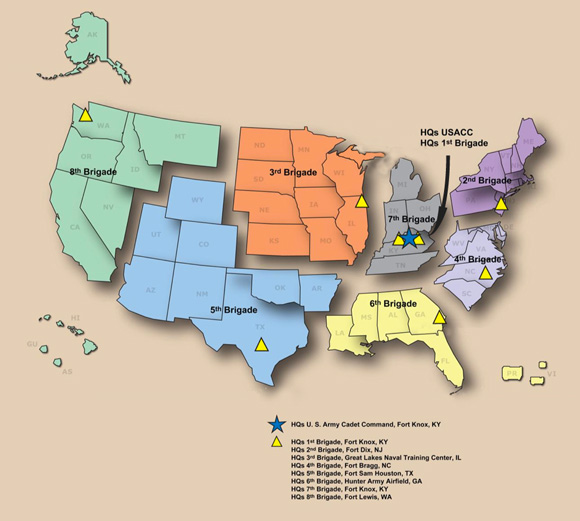
Map of the Army ROTC Brigades

The 1st Reserve Officers' Training Corps Brigade was an Army Reserve Officers' Training Corps brigade based at the Fort Knox, Kentucky. This brigade was responsible for the 10 Senior Military Colleges and Military Junior Colleges. The brigade cased its colors in 2026 and all ROTC schools under its command where moved to regionally based brigades.

== Pre 2026 Brigade Universities ==
- Senior Military Colleges
  - University of North Georgia
  - Norwich University
  - Texas A&M University
    - Texas A&M University Corps of Cadets
  - The Citadel
  - Virginia Military Institute
  - Virginia Tech
    - Virginia Tech Corps of Cadets
- Military Junior Colleges
  - Georgia Military College
  - Marion Military Institute
  - New Mexico Military Institute
  - Valley Forge Military Academy and College
