= 1st Muslim Brigade =

- Flag used by Yugoslav Partisans
- Active: 8 February 1944 – late February 1945
- Allegiance: People's Liberation Army of Yugoslavia
- Type: Infantry
- Size: 4 battalions
- Part of: Una Operational Group; 4th Corps of the Yugoslav Partisans
- Garrison/HQ: Velika Kladuša
- Engagements: World War II in Yugoslavia
- Decorations: Order of Brotherhood and Unity

The 1st Muslim Brigade of the Yugoslav Partisans (Serbo-Croatian: Prva muslimanska brigada) was an infantry brigade of the People's Liberation Army of Yugoslavia during World War II in Yugoslavia. The brigade was formed on 8 February 1944 in Velika Kladuša and remained active until late February 1945. It was formed primarily from Bosnian Muslims, similar to the 2nd Muslim Brigade and 16th Muslim Brigade, among others.

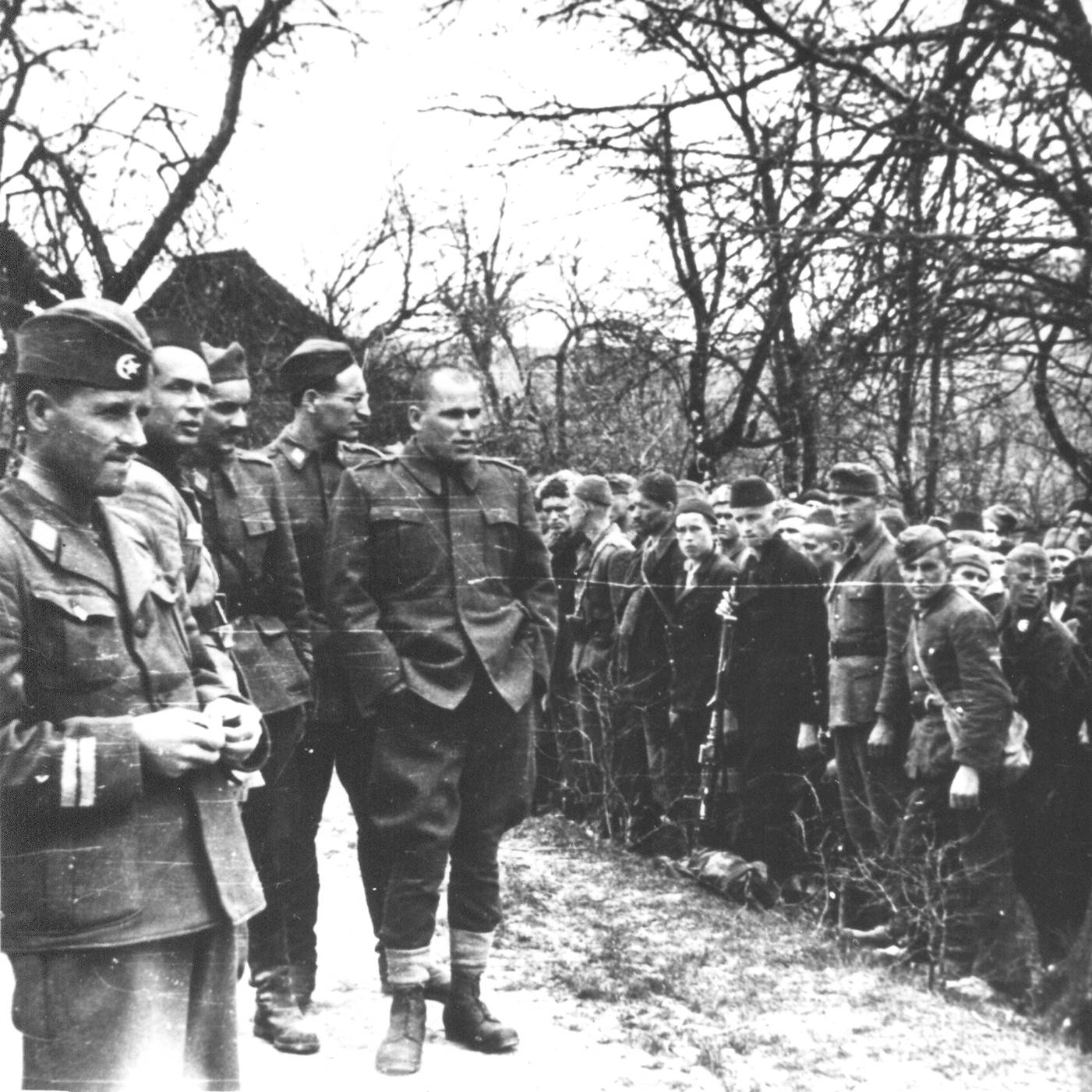
Troops of the 1st Muslim Brigade in April 1944. The officer on the far left wears an Islamic crescent moon and star badge on his cap.

The brigade was formed on 8 February 1944 in Velika Kladuša from the Vrnograč, Liskovac, Kladuša, and Šturlić Partisan battalions, together with approximately 100 fighters from the Cazin Partisan Detachment. At the time of its formation, the brigade numbered a total of 1,200 fighters. Upon its establishment, the brigade was subordinated to the Una Operational Group of the 4th Corps of the Yugoslav Partisans.

Until the beginning of April 1944, the brigade conducted combat operations in the area of the Cazin–Ostrožac road, as well as near Todorovo, Pećigrad, Skokovi, and other locations, fighting elements of the German 373rd (Croatian) Infantry Division and Ustaše–Croatian Home Guard forces.

On 19 and 20 February, units of the brigade disarmed a gendarmerie detachment from Cazin that was retreating toward Ostrožac. Thirty-one gendarmes were captured, and the brigade seized two light machine guns, twenty-two rifles, two pistols, 150,000 rounds of ammunition, and other equipment.

On 1 March, the brigade liberated Pećigrad after defeating a German and Ustaše–Home Guard garrison, inflicting losses of ten killed and seven captured. During the action, the brigade captured two mortars, four light machine guns, four submachine guns, ten rifles, and approximately 40,000 rounds of ammunition.

From 9 to 12 April, the brigade participated, together with the 2nd Kordun Assault Brigade of the 8th Division, in the unsuccessful Attack on Cazin (April 1944). Until mid-May, the brigade carried out sabotage actions along the Ostrožac–Pećigrad road, attacking enemy columns and transport units.

By July 1944, the brigade continued to engage in smaller-scale combat operations against Ustaše forces in the Cazin Krajina region and in the border areas of Lika, Kordun, and Banija. On 29 June, near Gornja Koprivna, the brigade repelled an Ustaše attack from Cazin after a five-hour battle, forcing the attackers to withdraw to their original garrison. Enemy losses were estimated at fifty killed and wounded.

From July 1944 until late February 1945, the brigade operated either independently or together with other units of the 4th Corps, primarily in the Cazin Krajina area. During this period, it fought frequent engagements with German and Ustaše–Home Guard forces near Cazin (during the September and November 1944 attacks), as well as in the areas of Ostrožac, Bihać, Otoka, Bosanska Krupa, Gnjilovac, Osredci, Vaganjac, Mutnik, and other localities.

In parallel, the brigade conducted sabotage operations against enemy lines of communication in the Una River valley and along the Bihać–Cazin and Otoka–Bužim roads. By February 1945, the brigade had grown to a strength of 1,327 fighters.

In late February 1945, the brigade was disbanded, and its personnel were reassigned to the newly formed Muslim Brigade of the 8th Division and to other units of the 8th Division.

The brigade was awarded the Order of Brotherhood and Unity for its contributions during the People's Liberation War.
