= 1st Panzergrenadier Brigade =

Coordinates: 52.154123°N 9.971015°E

- German: Panzergrenadierbrigade 1
- Formation sign
- Active: 1 April 1958 – 31 December 2007
- Country: West Germany (1958-1990); Germany (1990-2007)
- Branch: Bundeswehr
- Type: Panzergrenadier
- Part of: 1st Panzer Division
- Last headquarters: Mackensen-Kaserne in Hildesheim

Commanders
- Last commander: BrigGen Ernst-Otto Berk

The 1st Mechanized Infantry Brigade (German: Panzergrenadierbrigade 1) in Hildesheim was a formation in the Bundeswehr, which was subordinated to the 1st Armoured Division in Hanover. The Brigade was disbanded on 31 December 2007. During its lifetime the Brigade was stationed between the Lüneburg Heath, Harz Mountains, the Solling hills and the River Weser.

== Formation sign ==
The formation sign displays the white Sachsenross or Saxon steed on a red background within a yellow and white shield. The steed recalls the Welf dukes and the Kingdom of Hanover. The original Saxon tribal emblem was adopted in 1235 by the Welf dukes, the Dukes of Brunswick and Lüneburg, as an additional coat of arms. Through the amalgamation of part of the Lüneburg-Brunswick region with the Principality, later Kingdom, of Hanover the Saxon steed appeared in 1705 on the escutcheon of the kingdom's coat of arms surrounded by the main yellow and white shield. On the foundation of the state of Lower Saxony in 1952 the Saxon steed on a red field became the coat of arms of the state. The white border of the coat of arms, in embroidery shown as a white cord - represents the usual heraldic custom of the German Army: white borders were always the formation signs of the "first" brigades in a division. The superior division as well as the other two brigades in the division traditionally bore an identical formation sign apart from the white border. On the disbandment of the Brigade the sign continued to be worn by Panzerlehrbrigade 9, which gave up its old sign in 2006. The white border remains.

== Composition 2007 ==
In 2007, just before disbanding the brigade was organised as:

- Headquarters Company Stabskompanie, in Hildesheim
- 33rd Tank Battalion
- 421st Panzergrenadier Battalion
- 10th Armoured Engineer Company
- 15th Armoured Artillery Battalion
- 803rd Armoured Engineer Battalion
- 141st Logistics Battalion

== Commanders ==
The brigade commanders were (rank on taking over):

No.	Name	Date took over	Date handed over
16	Oberst Ernst-Otto Berk	27 March 2003	13. April 2006
15	Brigadegeneral Dieter Skodowski	26 March 1999	26 March 2003
14	Brigadegeneral Dr. Dirk Oetting	1 January 1995	25 March 1999
13	Oberst Jürgen Ruwe	1 October 1991	31 December 1994
12	Oberst Manfred Dietrich	1 December 1989	30 September 1991
11	Oberst Hans-Theodor Dingler	1 October 1987	20 December 1989
10	Oberst Istvan Csoboth	1 April 1984	30 September 1987
9	Brigadegeneral Johann Adolf (Hanno) Graf von Kielmansegg jun.	26 March 1982	31 March 1984
8	Brigadegeneral Detlef Ahrens	1 October 1977	26 March 1982
7	Oberst Walter Hoffmann	1 April 1973	30 September 1977
6	Brigadegeneral Johannes Poeppel	1 January 1970	31 March 1973
5	Brigadegeneral Carl-Gero von Ilsemann	1 October 1966	31 December 1969
4	Brigadegeneral Eicke Middeldorf	15 October 1963	30 September 1966
3	Brigadegeneral Heinz-Helmut Hinckeldey	1 October 1962	14 October 1963
2	Brigadegeneral Hans-Georg Tempelhoff	1 November 1959	30 September 1962
1	Oberst Hans-Heinz Fischer	1 April 1958	31 October 1959
