= 1st Bihać Infantry Brigade =

The 1st Bihać Infantry Brigade was formed on September 19, 1992, in Kamenica near Bihać, becoming part of the 5th Corps of the Army of the Republic of Bosnia and Herzegovina under the command of then Brigadier General (now Lieutenant General) Atif Dudaković.

== Subunits ==
The 1st Bihać Infantry Brigade consisted of:

- TO detachment with regiments of Orašac, Ćukovi, Kulen-Vakuf and Ripač - 500 to 600 soldiers
- TO detachment Centar - Bihać
- TO detachment Bakšaiš - Bihać
- TO rocket launcher detachment - Bihać
