= 1st Army Aviation Brigade =

- 1η Ταξιαρχία Αεροπορίας Στρατού
- Camp flag of the 1st Army Aviation Brigade
- Active: 1950-present
- Country: Greece
- Branch: Hellenic Army
- Type: Army aviation
- Size: 6 helicopter battalions 2 support battalions
- Part of: NATO Response Force; Balkan Battlegroup
- Garrison/HQ: Stefanovikeio, Thessaly
- Mottos: The zeal for freedom does not die ΟΥ ΘΝΑΣΚΕΙ ΖΑΛΟΣ ΕΛΕΥΘΕΡΙΑΣ; Ou thnaski zalos eleftherias

The 1st Army Aviation Brigade "Kilkis-Lachanas" (Greek: 1η Ταξιαρχία Αεροπορίας Στρατού «ΚΙΛΚΙΣ ΛΑΧΑΝΑ», romanized: 1 Taxiarchia Aeroporias Stratou "Kilkis Lachana", abbreviated 1η ΤΑΞΑΣ) is the main formation of the Hellenic Army's Army Aviation.

== History ==
In August, 1950, the first Αrmy Aviation unit was created, belonging to Artillery, the 190th Air Observation Unit, based at Megara airport. Also, few years later, a special Air Observation School was created in order to provide training, in parallel with the establishment of other support units. At that time, the unit's main activities included target detection for Artillery units and light transportation.

One of the most important dates was 1961, when the first helicopters, the Bell 47G, were delivered, marking the eve of new era, that of air assault and medium transportation. The modernization continued with the acquisition of Bell UH-1 Iroquoises in 1969, Boeing CH-47 Chinooks in 1981 and recently with the delivery of the Boeing AH-64D Apache and NHIndustries NH90.

With the continuous growth of the Hellenic Army Aviation combat arm, the 1st Army Aviation Brigade was founded in 1998 to encompass its various units. From 2013 until 2026, the brigade was subordinated to the First Army via the 1st Infantry Division. The brigade's headquarters is at Stefanovikeio.

The brigade bears the honorific title "Kilkis Lachanas", in commemoration of the Battle of Kilkis–Lachanas during the Second Balkan War.

The brigade's motto ΟΥ ΘΝΑΣΚΕΙ ΖΑΛΟΣ ΕΛΕΥΘΕΡΙΑΣ ("The zeal for freedom does not die") is an epigram written by Antiphilus of Byzantium about the warrior king Leonidas of Sparta.

== Structure ==
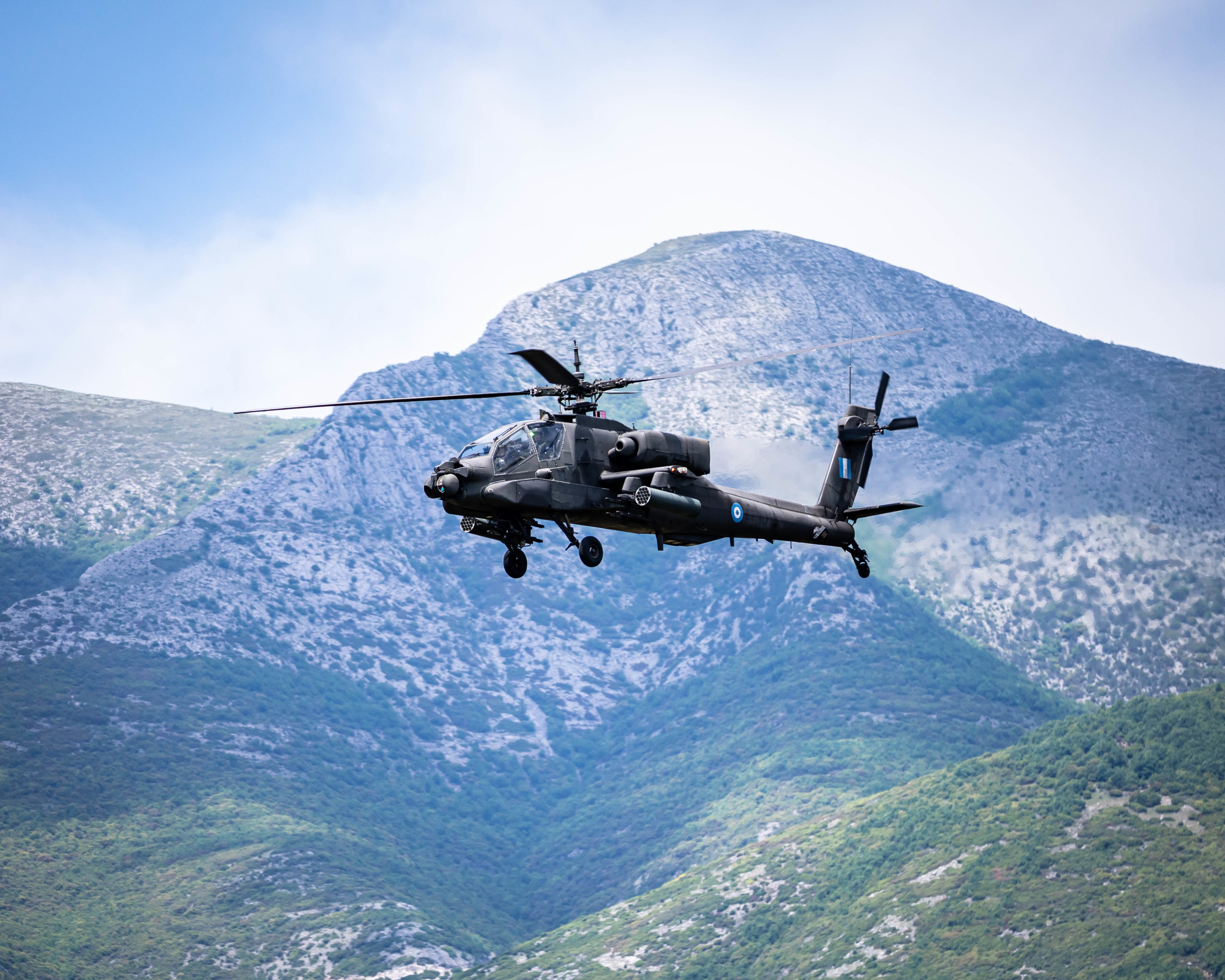
Greek Apache helicopter near Xanthi

- 1st Army Aviation Brigade, at Stefanovikeio Airfield in Stefanovikeio (Thessaly):
  - Headquarters Company
  - 17th Signal Company (17 ΛΔΒ)
  - 1st Attack Helicopter Battalion (1o ΤΕΕΠ)
  - 2nd Attack Helicopter Battalion (2o ΤΕΕΠ)
  - 1st Army Aviation Battalion (1o ΤΕΑΣ)
  - 1st Airfield Support Battalion (1ο ΤΥΑΔ)
  - 307th Support Battalion (307 TYΠ)
  - 2nd Army Aviation Group (2ο ΣΥΑΣ), at Pachi Airfield in Megara (Attica)
    - 2nd Army Aviation Battalion (2ο ΤΕΑΣ)
    - 4th Army Aviation Battalion (4ο ΤΕΑΣ)
    - 2nd Airfield Support Battalion (2ο ΤΥΑΔ)
  - 3rd Army Aviation Battalion (3ο ΤΕΑΣ), at Alexandria Airfield in Alexandreia (Central Macedonia)
  - Army Aviation School (ΣΑΣ), in Alexandreia, (Central Macedonia)
    - Army Aviation Training Centre (ΚΕΑΣ), in Alexandreia, (Central Macedonia)
