= 1st Aviation Brigade (Poland) =

- 1 Brygada Lotnictwa Wojsk Lądowych
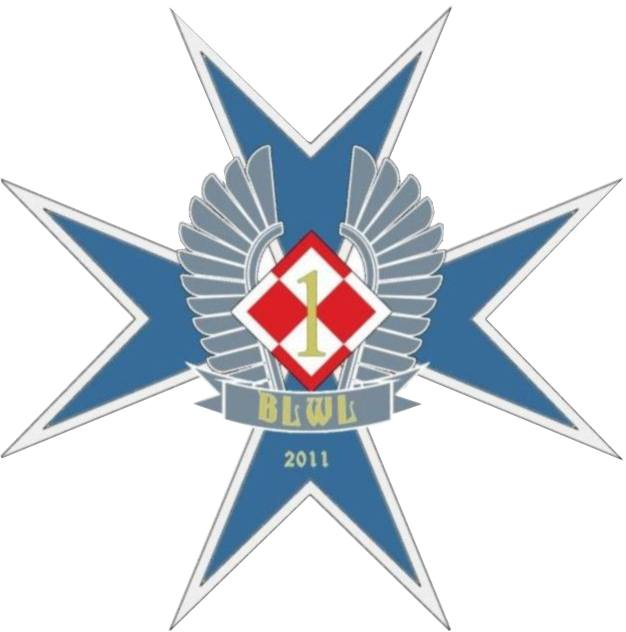
- Distinctive unit insignia
- Active: 2011–present
- Country: Poland
- Branch: Polish Land Forces
- Type: Aviation
- Size: Brigade
- Part of: Armed Forces General Command
- Garrison/HQ: Inowrocław
- Anniversaries: 6 June
- Engagements: War in Afghanistan

Commanders
- Current commander: Colonel. Sławomir Mąkosa

Insignia
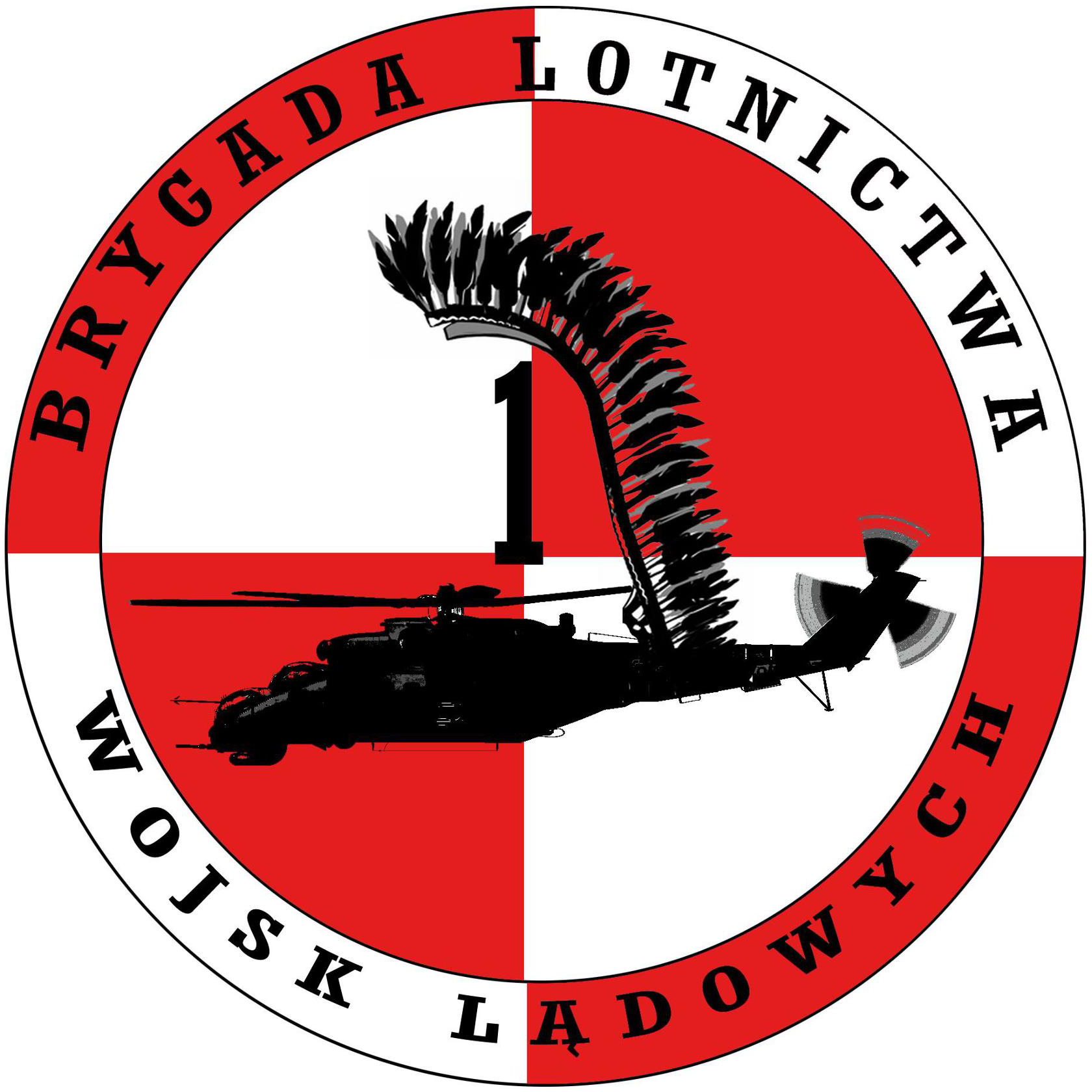
- Shoulder sleeve insignia (before 2013)

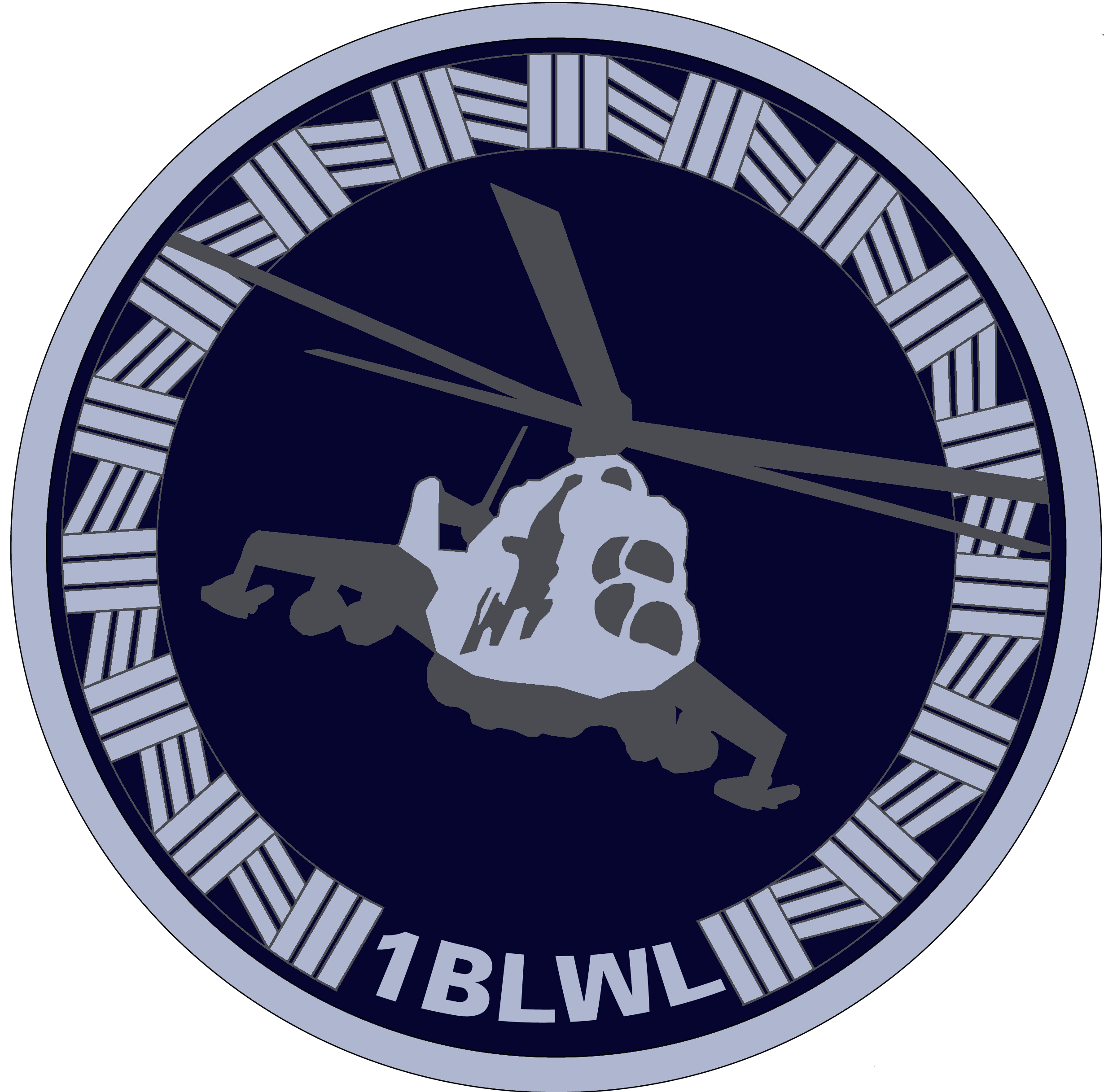
- Shoulder sleeve insignia (since 2013)

The 1st Aviation Brigade (Polish: 1 Brygada Lotnictwa Wojsk Lądowych (1 BLWL)) is a brigade of the Polish Armed Forces, headquartered in Inowrocław. The brigade is designed to provide military aviation support to the Polish Land Forces.

== History ==
The 1st Aviation Brigade was formed in 2011 based on the decision of the Minister of National Defense. Elements of the brigade took part in the War in Afghanistan, providing air support for Polish ground contingents. The brigade's anniversary was set to 6 June while a commemorative badge of the 1st Air Force Brigade was also introduced by the Minister of National Defense in April 2012.

== Structure ==
The brigade is structured as follows:

- 1st Army Aviation Brigade in Inowrocław
  - 49th Air Base in Pruszcz Gdański
    - 1st Squadron with 12x Mi-24W attack helicopters
    - 2nd Squadron with 12x Mi-2URP attack helicopters
    - 3rd Squadron with 16x Mi-2 NVG training helicopters
  - 56th Air Base in Inowrocław
    - 1st Squadron with 12x Mi-24W attack helicopters
    - 2nd Squadron with 12x Mi-2URP attack helicopters
    - 3rd Squadron with 8x PZL W-3PL Głuszec combat search and rescue helicopters
  - Air Reconnaissance Squadron in Mirosławiec with 45x Orbiter unmanned aerial vehicles
  - Tactical Air Control Party Central Group

== Commanders ==
- Brigadier General Krzysztof Mitręga (June 2011 - February 2014)
- Brigadier General pil. Dariusz Wroński (February 2014 - January 2015)
- Colonel Wiesław Franczak (January 2015 - June 2015)
- Colonel Sławomir Mąkosa (June 2015 - present)
