= 1st Combat Aviation Brigade (South Korea) =

Aviation brigade of South Korea Army

- 제1전투항공여단
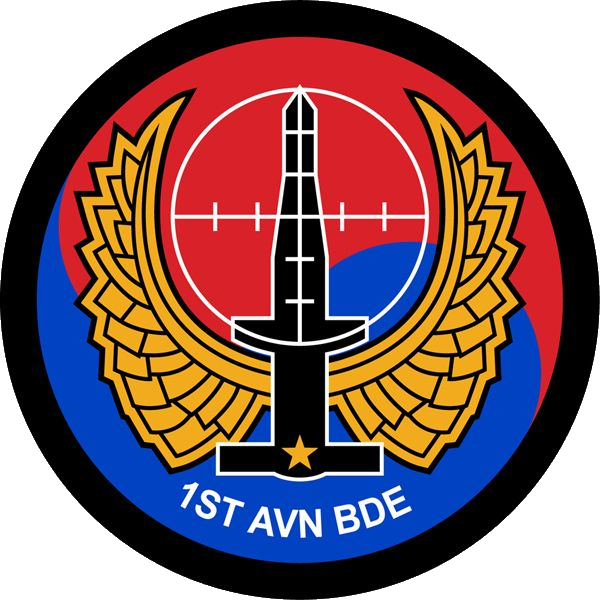
- Active: 1 June 1978 – present
- Country: South Korea
- Branch: Republic of Korea Army
- Type: Army aviation
- Size: Brigade
- Part of: Army Aviation Operations Command
- Garrison/HQ: Hanam, Gyeonggi Province

The 1st Combat Aviation Brigade (Korean: 제1전투항공여단) is a military formation of the Republic of Korea Army. The brigade is subordinated to the Army Aviation Operations Command (육군항공사령부).

== History ==
It was founded on June 1, 1978 with the 202nd and 203rd aviation battalions, operating UH-1H, were established at the 61st Aviation Group.

In order to suppress the Gwangju Uprising in 1980, in accordance with the "Helicopter Operation Plan" of the Army Headquarters, Brigadier General Song Jin-won of the 1st Aviation Brigade, ordered the unit to deployed to Gwangju on 22 May.

== Organization ==
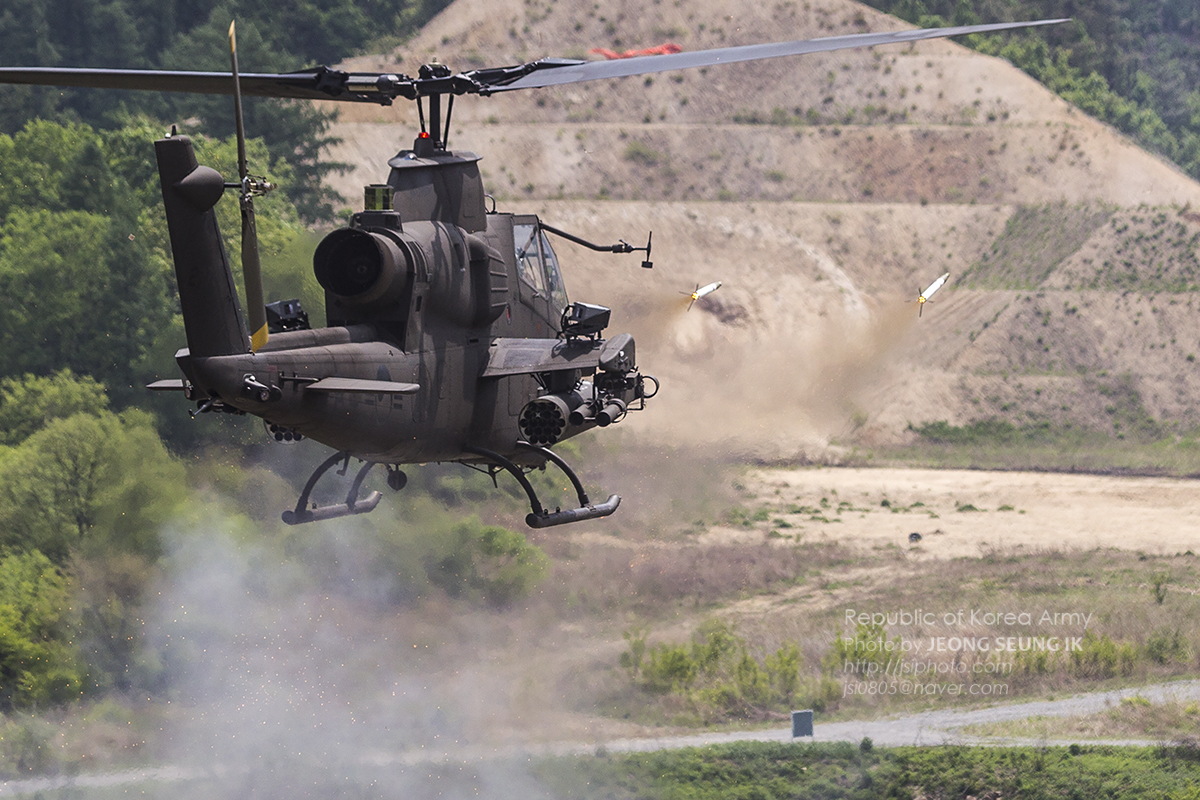
AH-1 attack helicopter of the 1st Aviation Brigade in training.

- Headquarters
- 111th Aviation Battalion (AH-1F/S)

It is a joint unit of the 6th Marine Brigade stationed on Baengnyeongdo.

- 502nd Aviation Battalion (50 MD 500)
- 901st Aviation Battalion (18 AH-64E)
- 902nd Aviation Battalion (18 AH-64E)
