= 1st Cavalry Brigade (Imperial Japanese Army) =

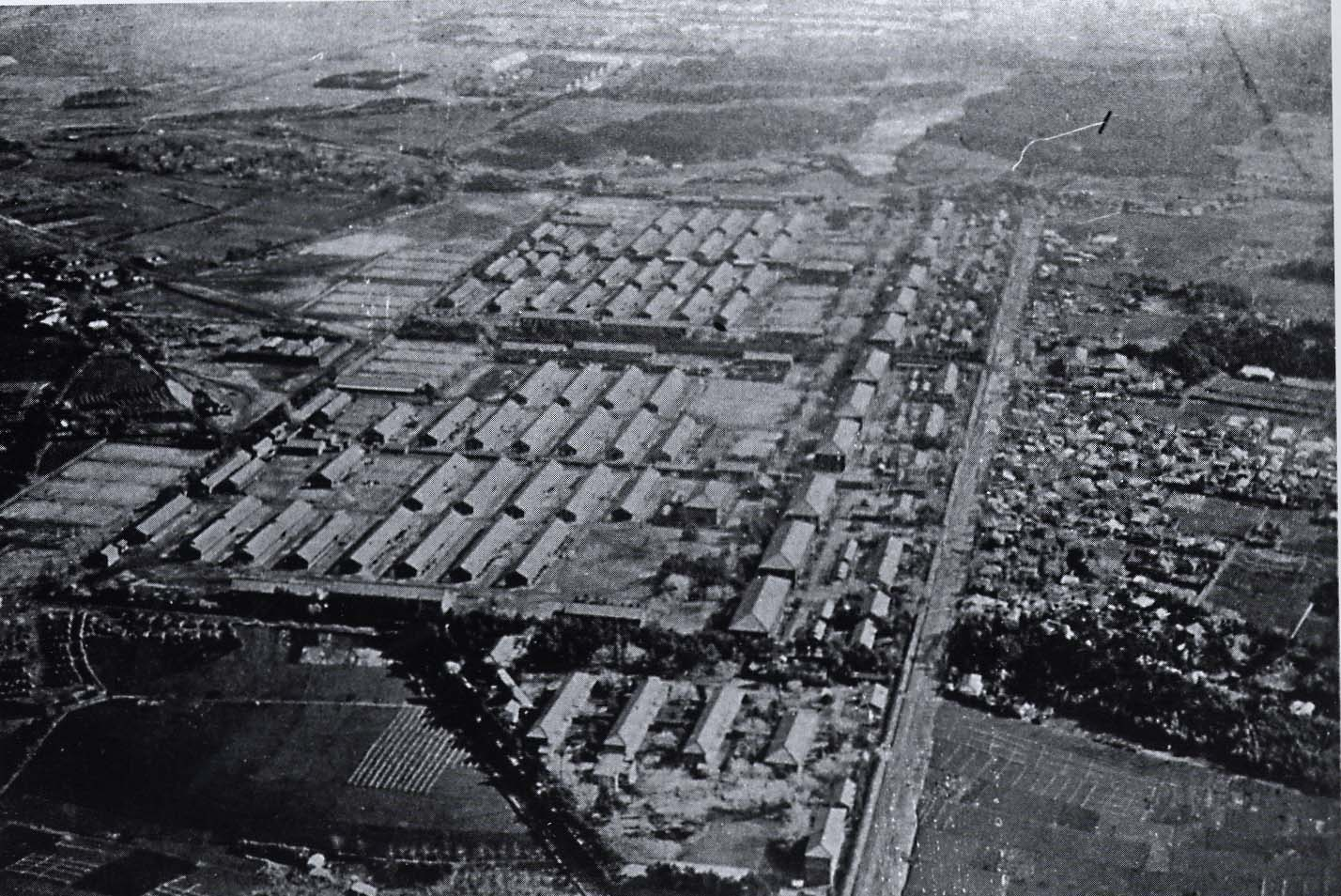
Headquarter of 1st Cavalry Brigade in Narashino

The 1st Cavalry Brigade of the Imperial Japanese Army was originally formed November 3, 1901.

It was assigned to Kwantung Army in April 1933 as part of the IJA Cavalry Group. It was then assigned with the Cavalry Group to the Northern China Area Army in June 1938. Again with the Group it was assigned to the Mongolia Garrison Army in February 1939.

== Organization ==
1st Cavalry Brigade

- 13th Cavalry Regiment
- 14th Cavalry Regiment
- Brigade Mounted Artillery Regiment

Later additions

- Brigade Machinegun unit
- Brigade Anti tank artillery squadron
- Brigade Tank unit
- Independent Infantry Battalion (motorized)
- Independent Engineer Squadron (motorized)
- 1st Mounted Artillery Regiment
- 71st Cavalry Regiment

== Commanders ==
- Yoshifuru Akiyama

== See also ==
- IJA Cavalry Units
