= 1st Cavalry Brigade (France) =

Former military unit of the French Army

The French 1st Cavalry Brigade was a military unit of the French Army which served during World War II. A partly horse-mounted unit, it fought in the Battle of Belgium and the Battle of France in May 1940. An element of the brigade was noted for its defence of Vendresse against German tanks, delaying their opponents for most of the day. After the Armistice of 22 June 1940 the brigade was reformed as a unit of Vichy France, but it was disbanded in November 1942.

== Pre-war ==
The 1st Cavalry Brigade was a pre-war unit commanded from 1936 by Colonel Maurice-Arthur-Alphonse Wemaere. In August 1939 it consisted of the 1st Hussar Cavalry Regiment and the 8th Cavalry (Chasseur à Cheval) Regiment and was commanded by General of Brigade Emile-Henri Gailliard. It was part of the 1st Cavalry Division. In February 1940, the 1st Cavalry Division became the partly motorized 1st Light Division and the 1st Cavalry Brigade became independent.

== Battles of Belgium and France ==
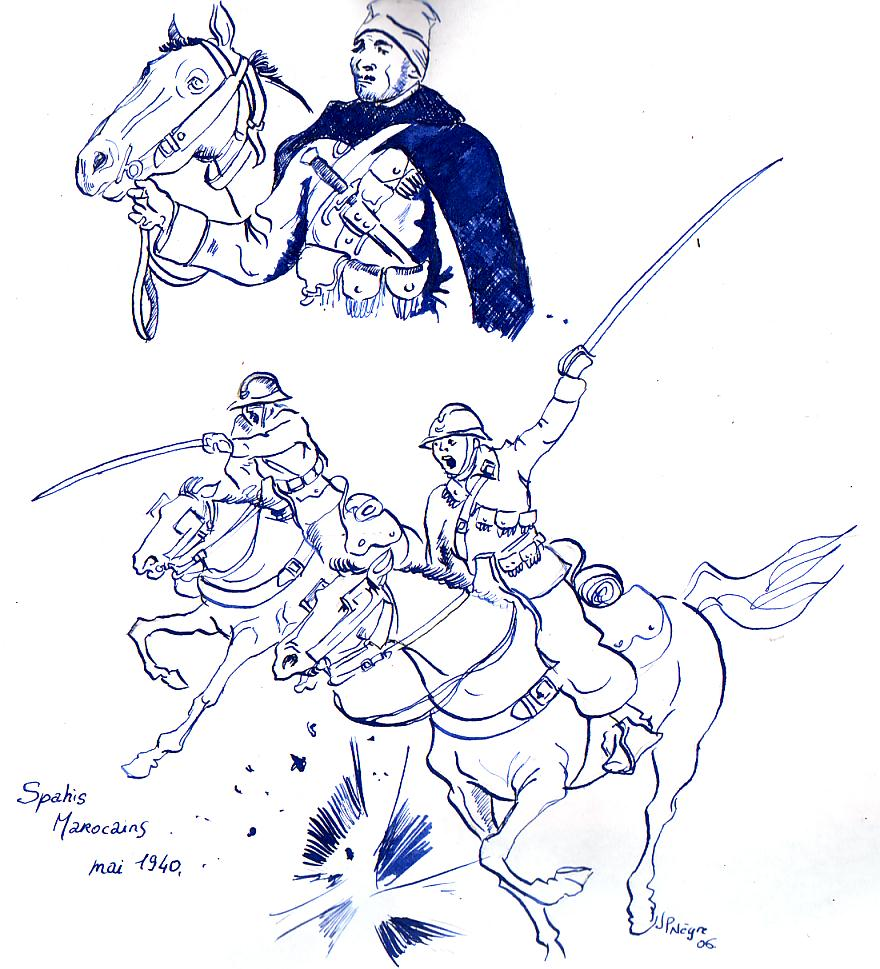
A depiction of French Spahi cavalry, 1940

The unit served directly under the Second Army during the opening stages of the Western Front of the Second World War, during which the unit was augmented with the 4th Tank Battalion. The cavalry of the Second Army was deployed into Belgium on the morning of 10 May 1940, after the German invasion. The 2nd Light Cavalry Division became engaged in heavy fighting with the advanced German units and was pushed back from near Étalle to Jamoigne. The 1st Cavalry Brigade was ordered to occupy a position between Jamoigne, Suxy and Straimont to defend the line. A horse troop was deployed within Suxy itself. The German 10th Panzer Division unexpectedly altered its line of advance which brought in into conflict with the 1st Cavalry Brigade on the morning of 11 May. The horse troop in Suxy held off the Infantry Regiment Großdeutschland until guns from the 16th Assault Gun Company forced them back. The brigade was pushed back around 3 kilometres (1.9 mi) from the west of Suxy, opening the route to Mortehan.

The unit was thereafter lightly engaged and withdrew in cooperation with the adjacent 5th Light Cavalry Division towards their final defensive position along the Semois river. Hampered by refugees and generally slower than the German Panzer Division troops the retreat was confused and some German forces crossed the river, compromising the defence. The French cavalry had largely been ineffective in its objective to delay the German advance in Belgium; it had been surprised by the speed of the German troops and had insufficient tanks and anti-tank weaponry to oppose them.

The unit was afterwards deployed in France to defend the rear of the Maginot Line from a German advance from Sedan. With both units weakened by losses in Belgium it was combined with the 5th Light Cavalry Division and assigned to XXI Corps. The unit fought alongside the 3rd Spahi Brigade of African cavalry to defend the Ourthe River. With other units pushed back the 1st Cavalry Brigade covered the French withdrawal south to Chagny. On 14 May the unit attempted to defend Vendresse against the 1st Panzer Division, with the 5th Light Cavalry Division. The units, many of whom were horse-mounted, held up the German armour for the entire day, before withdrawing, when ordered, at 5 p.m. A horse troop from the 1st Cavalry Brigade took part in the defence of Chagny against the 1st and 2nd Panzer Regiments and suffered heavy losses, withdrawing to Hill 250.

== Vichy unit ==
After the French surrender the 1st Cavalry Brigade was restored as a unit of Vichy France. In September 1940 it consisted of the 1st and 7th Cavalry (Chasseur à Cheval) Regiments. It was disbanded in November 1942.
