= 1st Cavalry Brigade (Hungary) =

Royal Hungarian Army combat formation

The 1st Cavalry Brigade was a formation of the Royal Hungarian Army that participated in the Axis invasion of Yugoslavia during World War II.

== Organization ==
Structure of the brigade:

- Headquarters - under Brigadier General Lajos Veress
- 3rd Armoured Reconnaissance Battalion
- 3rd Cavalry Regiment
- 4th Cavalry Regiment
- 13th Bicycle Battalion
- 14th Bicycle Battalion
- 3rd Motorized Artillery Battalion
- 1st Horse Artillery Battalion
- 1st Cavalry Artillery Battalion
- 1st Cavalry Anti-Aircraft Battery
- 1st Cavalry Engineer Company
- 1st Cavalry Bridging Engineer Company
- 1st Cavalry Signal Company
- 1st Cavalry Traffic Control Signal Company
- 1st Cavalry Brigade Service Regiment
