= 1st Mechanized Cavalry Brigade =

- 1st Mechanized Cavalry Brigade insignia
- Active: 1974–present
- Country: Brazil
- Branch: 3rd Army Division
- Garrison/HQ: Julio Avenue Castillos 137, Santiago, Rio Grande do Sul
- Website: Brigade website

Commanders
- Current commander: General de Brigada Douglas Bassoli

Insignia
- Abbreviation: 1ª Bda C Mec

The 1st Mechanized Cavalry Brigade (1st Brigade C Mec), is one of the mechanized brigades of the Brazilian Army. Its headquarters is located in the city of Santiago, in the Brazilian state of Rio Grande do Sul. It is part of the Brazilian Army 3rd Division, based in the city of Santa Maria, Rio Grande do Sul. Also known by its historical designation - Brigade José Luiz Menna Barreto.

== Subordinated military organizations ==
- HQ/1st Mechanized Cavalry Brigade - Santiago
  - HQ Troops/1st Mechanized Cavalry Brigade - Santiago
  - 1st Mechanized Cavalry Regiment - Itaqui
  - 2nd Mechanized Cavalry Regiment - São Borja
  - 4th Armored Cavalry Regiment - São Luiz Gonzaga
  - 19th Mechanized Cavalry Regiment - Santa Rosa
  - 19th Field Artillery Group - Santiago
  - 9th Logistic Battalion - Santiago
  - 1st Mechanized Combat Engineering Company - São Borja
  - 11th Mechanized Signal Company - Santiago
  - 1st Military Police Platoon - Santiago

== See also ==
- Ministry of Defence (Brazil)
- Brazilian Army
