= 1st Separate Brigade (Philippine Expedition) =

The 1st Separate Brigade (Philippine Expedition), United States Army was a U.S. expeditionary brigade. It was commanded by Brigadier General Marcus P. Miller consisted of the 18th U.S. Infantry Regiment, 51st Iowa Infantry Regiment and a battery of 6th Artillery. It was organised to provide a U.S. Army expeditionary force for the Philippine campaign of the Spanish–American War.

== History ==
It was formed on December 24, 1898, after General Otis received permission from the United States Department of War to accept the surrender of the Spanish garrison of Iloilo City. The brigade left Manila on December 26 and arrived outside the city abroad the cruiser USS Baltimore on the morning of the 28th to discover insurgents had already occupied the city. Miller, at the request of Otis, tried to negotiate for US troops to enter the city but a stalemate ensued. On February 2 the 51st had to be returned to Manila due to poor morale.
