= 159th Infantry Brigade (United Kingdom) =

159th (Welsh Border) Infantry Brigade 159th Infantry Brigade
- Active: 1921–1946
- Country: United Kingdom
- Branch: Territorial Army
- Type: Infantry; Motorised infantry
- Size: Brigade
- Part of: 53rd (Welsh) Infantry Division; 11th Armoured Division
- Nickname: "The Black Bull" (divisional nickname when assigned to the 11th Armoured Division)
- Engagements: Battle of Normandy; Operation Epsom; Operation Goodwood; Operation Bluecoat; Falaise Pocket; Operation Market Garden; Battle of the Bulge; Western Allied invasion of Germany

Commanders
- Notable commanders: Charles E. Hudson VC

The 159th Infantry Brigade was an infantry brigade of the British Army. Part of the Territorial Army (TA), the brigade was assigned to the 53rd (Welsh) Infantry Division and served with the division in the early stages of the Second World War until May 1942 when it was transferred to be the motorised infantry element of the 11th Armoured Division. The brigade would serve with the 11th Armoured in North-west Europe from June 1944 to May 1945.

== History ==
The brigade was formed in the Territorial Army by the redesignation of the 159th (Cheshire) Infantry Brigade, after most of its battalions were amalgamated or posted elsewhere. Assigned to the 53rd (Welsh) Infantry Division, the 159th (Welsh Border) Infantry Brigade was composed of the 1st, 2nd and 3rd battalions of the Monmouthshire Regiment and the 1st Battalion, Herefordshire Regiment, all originally from the 160th (South Wales) Infantry Brigade.

In the late 1930s, there was an increasing need to strengthen the anti-aircraft defences of the United Kingdom, and so many infantry battalions of the Territorial Army were converted into anti-aircraft or searchlight units, of either the Royal Artillery or Royal Engineers. As a result, on 1 November 1938, the 1st (Rifle) Battalion, Monmouthshire Regiment was converted into an artillery role, becoming 1st (Rifle) Battalion, The Monmouthshire Regiment (68th Searchlight Regiment) In the same year the 2nd Battalion, Monmouthshire Regiment was swapped for the 4th Battalion, King's Shropshire Light Infantry of the 160th (South Wales) Infantry Brigade. In 1939 the brigade was redesignated 159th Infantry Brigade.

== Second World War ==
In late August 1939, due to the worsening situation in Europe, the brigade, with headquarters at Hereford, and the 53rd Division, together with the rest of the Territorial Army, were mobilised for full-time war service on 1 September, the day the German Army invaded Poland. Two days later, the Second World War officially began and all units of the division were soon brought up to strength.

In December 1939 the 159th Brigade was sent to Northern Ireland to join the 158th and 160th Infantry brigades which had been sent earlier in the year. When the British Expeditionary Force (BEF) fighting in France and Belgium was evacuated from the continent in the Dunkirk evacuation the brigade began training to repel an invasion (Operation Green, which never took place). The brigade was to remain there until March 1942 when it was sent, with the rest of the 53rd Division, to Kent.

The creation of the 11th Armoured Division in March 1941 (which initially included the 29th and 30th Armoured brigades) was part of the British Army's answer to the success of the German Army's panzer divisions in the previous years. During the invasion of Poland in September 1939 then in Western Europe in the Netherlands, Belgium and France in mid-1940, the German armoured elements had clearly displayed new tactics and methods of fighting; the Allied Forces now had to address those developments in Europe.

On 17 May 1942, the 159th Infantry Brigade was detached from the 53rd Division to help form the 11th Armoured Division, from thereon being involved in intensive training while gradually receiving new, more modern equipment. In November 1942, together with the rest of the division, the brigade was warned to prepare for overseas service in the Tunisia Campaign as the Allies invaded North Africa as part of Operation Torch. The order was cancelled as it was decided, due to the nature of the country, that more infantry were needed.

=== Order of Battle ===
159th Infantry Brigade was constituted as follows during the war:

- 4th Battalion, King's Shropshire Light Infantry
- 3rd Battalion, Monmouthshire Regiment (left 3 April 1945)
- 1st Battalion, Herefordshire Regiment
- 159th Infantry Brigade Anti-Tank Company (formed 29 June 1940, left 15 February 1941 to join 53rd (Welsh) Reconnaissance Battalion)
- 1st Battalion, Cheshire Regiment (from 6 April 1945)

=== Commanders ===
The following officers commanded 159th Infantry Brigade during the war:

- Brigadier J.G. Bruxner-Randall (until 14 July 1941)
- Brigadier C.E. Hudson VC (from 14 to 30 July 1941)
- Lieutenant-Colonel A.D. Bryant (Acting, from 30 July until 24 August 1941)
- Brigadier C.B. Callander (from 24 August 1941 until 22 June 1942)
- Brigadier J.G. Sandle (from 22 June 1942 until 4 July 1944)
- Brigadier J.B. Churcher (from 4 July 1944)

=== Normandy to Belgium ===
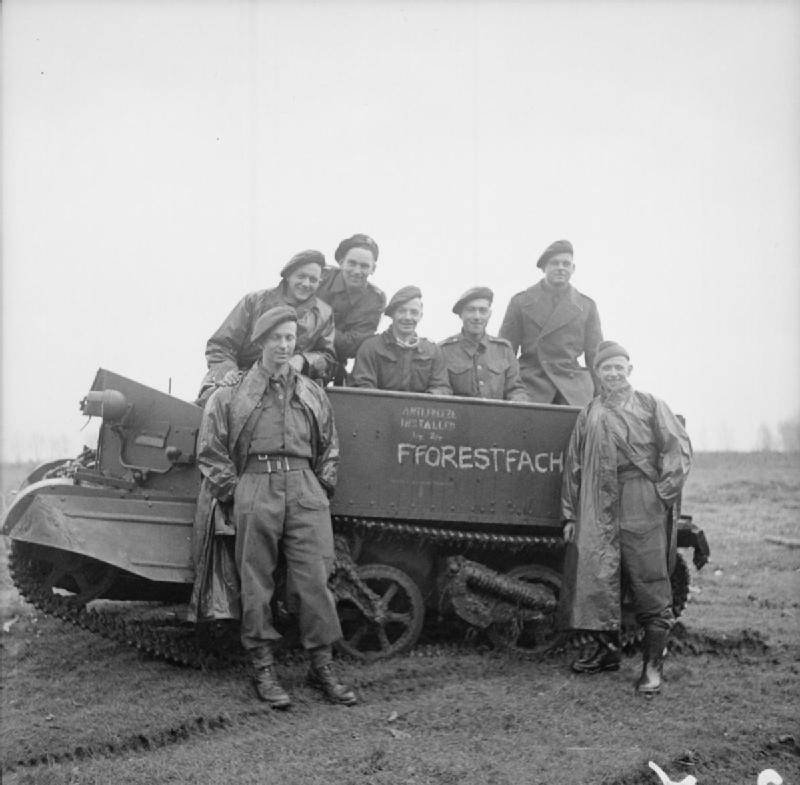
Men of the carrier platoon of the 3rd Battalion, Monmouthshire Regiment, part of 159th Infantry Brigade, February 1945.

The 159th Brigade landed in Normandy, as part of Operation Overlord (codename for the Battle of Normandy), on Juno Beach on 13 June 1944, seven days after the initial D-Day landings on 6 June 1944. During the Battle for Caen the brigade took part in Operations Epsom, Goodwood, Bluecoat and the actions around the Falaise Pocket. In August the brigade, commanded now by Brigadier John B. Churcher, together with the rest of the 11th Armoured, advanced into France, participating in the "swan" to Amiens; the fastest and deepest penetration into enemy territory ever made until the Gulf War in the early 1990s. The 11th Armoured Division then turned northward to Belgium and captured the city of Antwerp on 4 September.

=== Market Garden to Germany ===
The 159th Brigade had a fairly minor role in Operation Market Garden in September 1944 and later went on to participate in the Ardennes offensive, the Battle of the Bulge, in December 1944.

Soon thereafter, the 11th Armoured Division pushed forward into the German-occupied Netherlands. In March 1945, it crossed the Rhine River and by the end of the war had advanced to the northeast and captured the German city of Lübeck on 2 May 1945.

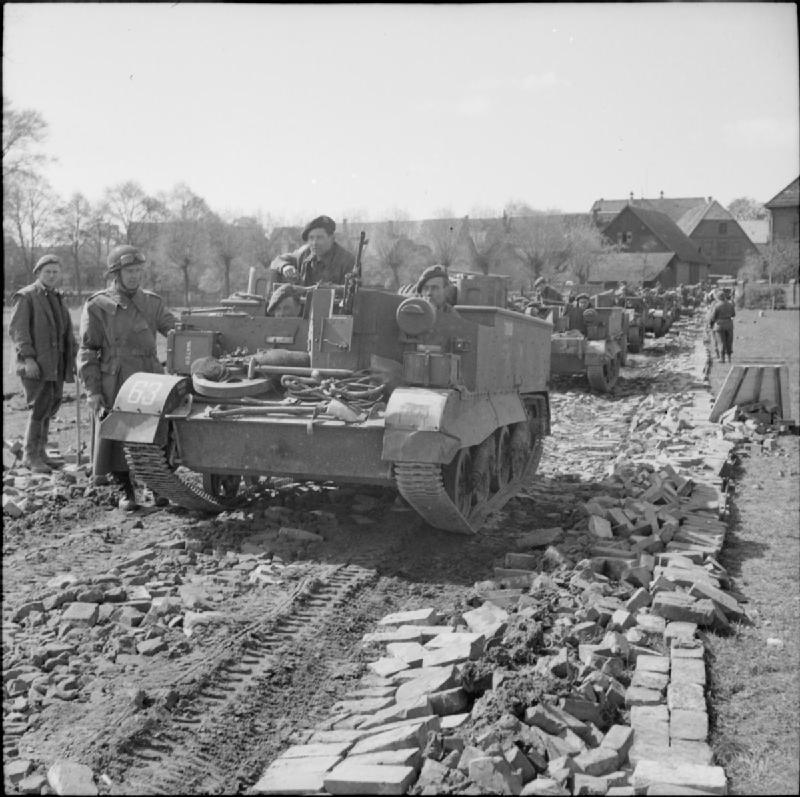
Universal Carriers of the 1st Battalion, Herefordshire Regiment's anti-tank platoon move up towards the Weser bridgehead, 7 April 1945.

As it drove into Germany, the brigade occupied the Bergen-Belsen concentration camp on 15 April 1945, pursuant to a 12 April agreement with the retreating Germans to surrender the camp peacefully. When the 159th Brigade entered the camp, they found more than 60,000 emaciated and ill prisoners in desperate need of medical attention. More than 13,000 corpses in various stages of decomposition lay littered around the camp. Elements of the 11th Armoured Division and its higher formations were detached to oversee the work needed in the camp.

From the end of the war in Europe (8 May 1945, Victory in Europe Day) the 11th Armoured Division was involved in the occupation of Germany until its disbandment in January 1946. Many of its units, however, were transferred to the 7th Armoured Division. The 159th Brigade was disbanded in the same year. Throughout the North-West Europe Campaign of 1944–45 the division had suffered nearly 10,000 casualties, including 2,000 killed, and "The PBI - poor bloody infantry - in 159 Brigade suffered the worst. The 3rd Monmouthshires lost 292 killed, 4th Kings Shropshire Light Infantry 271, the 1st Herefords 223."

== Victoria Cross recipients ==
- Sergeant George Harold Eardley, 4th Battalion, King's Shropshire Light Infantry
- Corporal Edward Thomas Chapman, 3rd Battalion, Monmouthshire Regiment

== Bibliography ==
- Joslen, H. F. (2003) [1960]. Orders of Battle: Second World War, 1939–1945. Uckfield, East Sussex: Naval and Military Press. ISBN 978-1-84342-474-1.
- Delaforce, Patrick. The Black Bull: From Normandy to the Baltic with the 11th Armoured Division.
