= John Churcher =

British Army general (1905–1997)

Major-General John Churcher CB DSO*
- Churcher in 1950
- Born: 9 September 1905; Reading, Berkshire, England
- Died: 2 August 1997 (aged 91); Colchester, Essex, England
- Military career
- Allegiance: United Kingdom
- Branch: British Army
- Service years: 1925–1959
- Rank: Major-General
- Service number: 31905
- Unit: Duke of Cornwall's Light Infantry
- Commands: 3rd Infantry Division (1954–1957); 5th Infantry Division (1947); 3rd Infantry Division (1946–1947); 2nd Infantry Division (1946); 50th (Northumbrian) Infantry Division (1946); 43rd (Wessex) Infantry Division (1946); 159th Infantry Brigade (1944–1946); 1st Battalion, Herefordshire Regiment (1942–1944)
- Conflicts: Second World War
- Awards: Companion of the Order of the Bath; Distinguished Service Order & Bar; Mentioned in Despatches

Major-General John Bryan Churcher, CB, DSO & Bar (9 September 1905 – 2 August 1997) was a senior British Army officer who, during the Second World War, commanded the 159th Infantry Brigade during the campaign in Northwest Europe and later commanded the 3rd Infantry Division.

== Military career ==
Churcher was born on 9 September 1905 and entered the Royal Military College, Sandhurst, from where he was commissioned as a second lieutenant into the Duke of Cornwall's Light Infantry, a light infantry regiment of the British Army, in 1925.

Churcher fought in the Second World War as commanding officer of the 1st Battalion, Herefordshire Regiment and then as commander of the 159th Infantry Brigade, serving in North-West Europe as part of the 11th Armoured Division.

After the war, Churcher became general officer commanding (GOC) 43rd (Wessex) Infantry Division in March 1946, GOC 50th (Northumbrian) Infantry Division and Northumbrian District in August 1946, and GOC 2nd Infantry Division in the Far East in October 1946. He then became GOC 3rd Infantry Division in Palestine in December 1946 and GOC 5th Infantry Division in April 1947–in this role he had orders to disband it.

Churcher became chief of staff at Southern Command in 1951–in this capacity he organised the response to the devastating Lynmouth Flood in 1952. He returned to the command of GOC 3rd Infantry Division in 1954 and became Director of Military Training at the War Office in 1957 before retiring in 1959.

Churcher is buried at St Mary's Churchyard at Wargrave in Berkshire.

Military offices
Preceded by George Erskine	GOC 43rd (Wessex) Infantry Division; March–June 1946	Succeeded by George Symes
Preceded by Robert Naylor	GOC 50th (Northumbrian) Infantry Division; August–October 1946	Succeeded by John Whitfield
Preceded by Robert Arkwright	GOC 2nd Infantry Division; October–December 1946	Succeeded by Philip Balfour
Preceded by Lashmer Whistler	GOC 3rd Division; 1946–1947	Succeeded by George Wood
Preceded by Philip Gregson-Ellis	GOC 5th Division; April–September 1947	Post disbanded
Preceded by Nigel Poett	GOC 3rd Division; 1954–1957	Succeeded by George Gordon-Lennox
