= Philip Balfour =

Lieutenant-General Sir Philip Balfour KBE CB MC*
- Born: 10 March 1898
- Died: 4 February 1977 (aged 78)
- Military career
- Allegiance: United Kingdom
- Branch: British Army
- Service years: 1915–1953
- Rank: Lieutenant-General
- Service number: 11645
- Unit: Royal Artillery
- Commands: Northern Command (1949–1953); 7th Armoured Division (1947–1948); 2nd Infantry Division (1947); 53rd (Welsh) Infantry Division (1946–1947)
- Conflicts: First World War; Second World War
- Awards: Knight Commander of the Order of the British Empire; Companion of the Order of the Bath; Military Cross & Bar

Lieutenant-General Sir Philip Maxwell Balfour, KBE, CB, MC & Bar (10 March 1898 – 4 February 1977) was a senior British Army officer who achieved high office in the 1950s.

== Military career ==
Philip Balfour was born on 10 March 1898 and educated at Wellington College, Berkshire, and the Royal Military Academy, Woolwich. He was commissioned as a second lieutenant into the Royal Artillery on 28 July 1915, alongside Cameron Nicholson and John Kennedy of the Royal Garrison Artillery. He served in the First World War, being deployed to France and Belgium, and receiving the Military Cross.

For conspicuous gallantry and devotion to duty. During a heavy bombardment of his battery he organised a party, and at great personal risk, extinguished a burning ammunition dump. Two days afterwards, when acting as Brigade Forward Observing Officer, he showed great initiative in obtaining information as to the position of the infantry, making two journeys in the dark through an intense shell and machine gun barrage to a battalion headquarters 600 yards away. He was the means of bringing back valuable information and acted throughout with exceptional gallantry and resource.

The war over due to the Armistice of 11 November 1918, he attended the Staff College, Camberley from 1929 to 1930.

Balfour also served in the Second World War, initially as a GSO2 before being made Commander, Royal Artillery of the 55th (West Lancashire) Infantry Division. From 1944 he was serving as Brigadier General Staff of John Crocker's I Corps throughout the North West Europe campaign, and was appointed a Commander of the Order of the British Empire for "gallant and distinguished services in Normandy" as a temporary brigadier.

After the war Balfour joined the Control Commission in Germany in 1945 and then became Director of Civil Affairs for the Military Government, British Army of the Rhine in 1946. He was appointed General Officer Commanding (GOC) 53rd (Welsh) Infantry Division later in 1946 and then GOC 2nd Division in 1947. Finally he became GOC-in-Chief Northern Command in 1949; in that role he was critical of the standard of shooting in the British Army. He retired in 1953.

Military offices
Preceded by George Richards	GOC 53rd (Welsh) Infantry Division; 1946–1947	Succeeded by Christopher Woolner
Preceded by John Churcher	GOC 2nd Infantry Division; 1947	Succeeded by Philip Roberts
Preceded by Philip Roberts	GOC 7th Armoured Division; 1947–1948	Position abolished
Preceded by Sir Montagu Stopford	GOC-in-C Northern Command; 1949–1953	Succeeded by Sir Geoffrey Evans
