= 11th Armoured Division (United Kingdom) =

British armoured division

- Insignia of the 11th Armoured Division
- Active: 1941–1946; 1952–1956
- Country: United Kingdom
- Branch: British Army
- Type: Armoured
- Size: Division, 14,964 men 343 tanks (Note: 223 cruisers, 25 anti-aircraft tanks, 24 close support tanks, 63 light tanks, and 8 Observation tanks.) (Note: These two figures are the war establishment, the on-paper strength, of the division for 1944/1945; for information on how the division size changed over the war please see British Army during the Second World War and British Armoured formations of World War II.)
- Engagements: Operation Overlord; Operation Market Garden; Battle of the Bulge; Operation Varsity

Commanders
- Notable commanders: Percy Hobart; Charles Keightley; George Roberts

The 11th Armoured Division was an armoured division of the British Army which was created in March 1941 during the Second World War. The division was formed in response to the unanticipated success of the German panzer divisions. The 11th Armoured was responsible for several major victories in the Battle of Normandy from in the summer of 1944, shortly after the Normandy landings, and it participated in the Allied advance from Paris to the Rhine, the Rhine crossing in March 1945. It was disbanded in January 1946 and reformed towards the end of 1950. In 1956, it was converted into the 4th Infantry Division.

== Background and formation ==
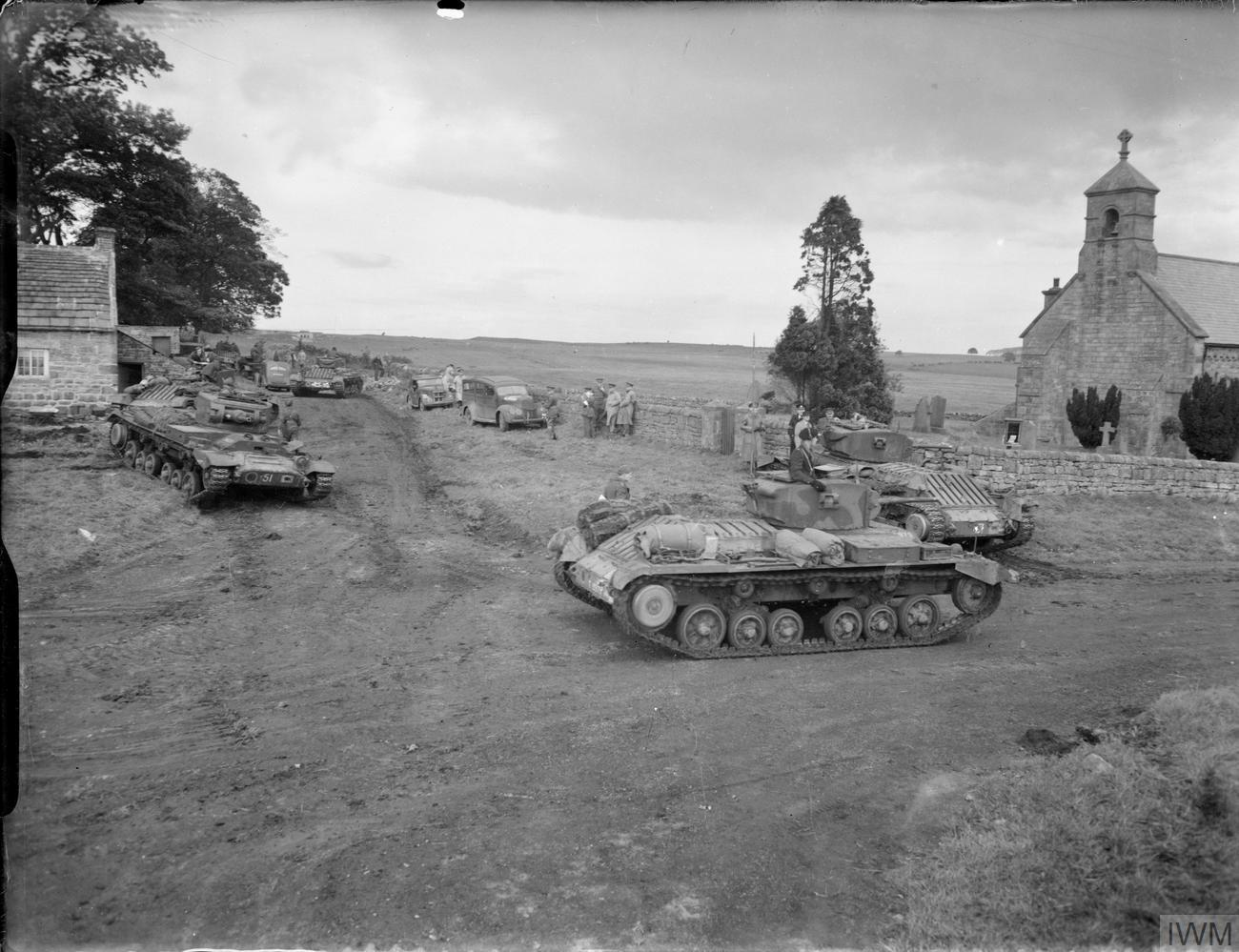
Valentine tanks of the 11th Armoured Division gather near a church during an exercise in Northern Command, 16 October 1941.

The 11th Armoured Division was organized in March 1941, in Yorkshire under Northern Command, under Major-General Percy Hobart. A veteran of the Royal Tank Regiment, he had already strongly influenced the shape of the 7th Armoured Division, but his original and innovative ideas had led to his early retirement from the army. Reinstated after the disasters of the Battle of France in May–June 1940, he further realised his vision with the 11th Armoured Division. Under his leadership the division adopted the "Charging Bull" as its emblem.

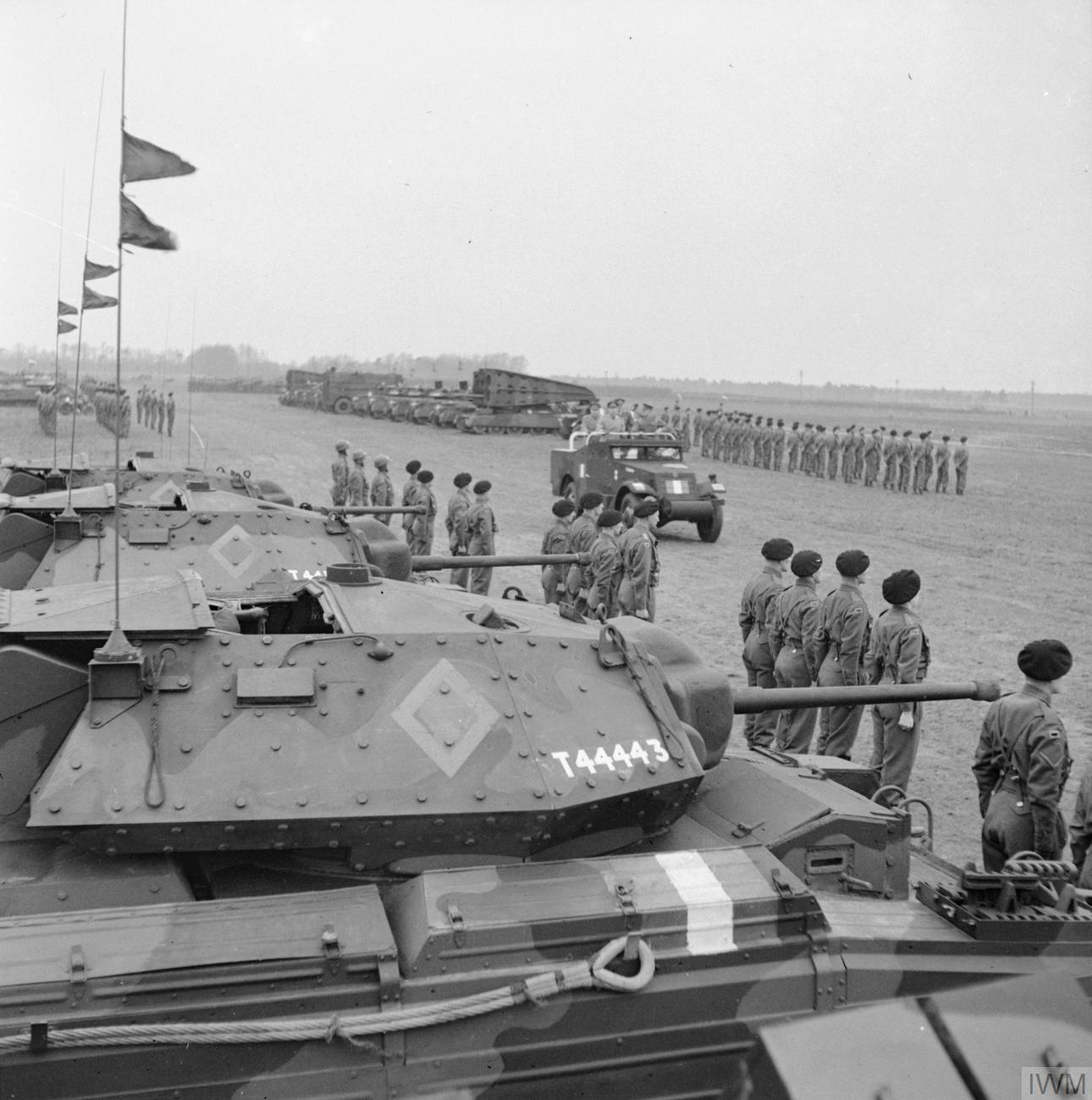
King George VI inspects Crusader tanks of the 11th Armoured Division in January 1943.

Originally composed of the 29th and 30th Armoured Brigade, together with the 11th Support Group, it was reorganised in late May and early June 1942 on the standard armoured division establishment of the time, of a single armoured brigade and an infantry brigade, along with supporting units. As a result, the 11th Support Group was disbanded and the 30th Armoured Brigade left the division, to be replaced by the 159th Infantry Brigade, transferred from the 53rd (Welsh) Infantry Division. After this reorganisation, for the next two years it conducted intensive training while gradually receiving new, more modern equipment. In November 1942, as the Allies invaded French North Africa as part of Operation Torch the division, then serving in Scotland and now commanded by Major-General Brocas Burrows after Hobart was deemed too old, at 57, for active service, was warned to prepare for overseas service to join the British First Army, soon to be engaged in hard fighting in Tunisia, and had begun embarking when the order was cancelled, as it was felt that less armour and more infantry were needed in the difficult terrain in that country.

Training continued throughout the remainder of 1942 and the whole of 1943; Major-General Philip Roberts, an experienced armoured commander, took command in December 1943.

== History ==
=== Normandy ===
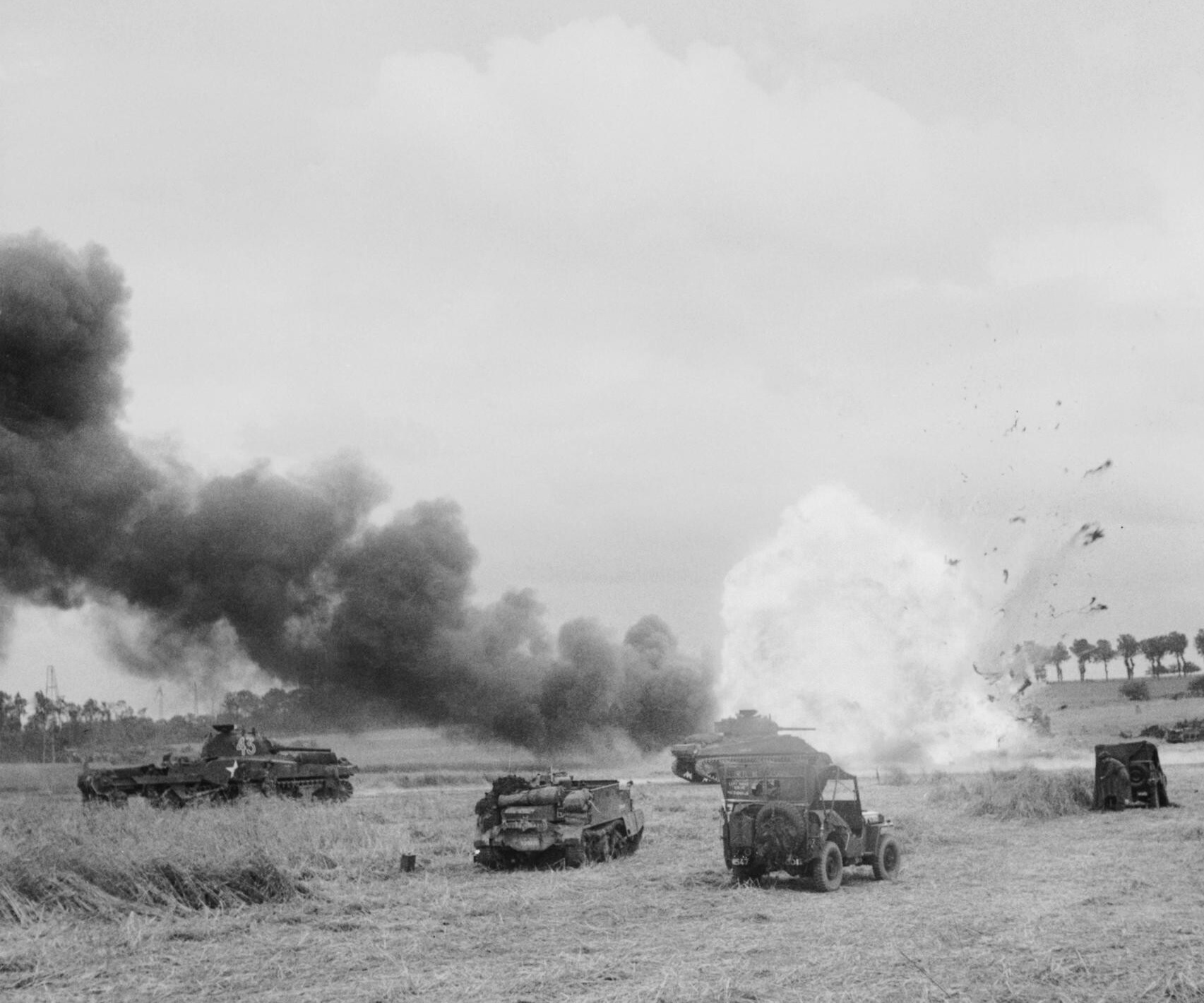
An ammunition carrier of the 11th Armoured Division explodes after being hit by a mortar round during Operation Epsom on 26 June 1944.

Most of the 11th Armoured Division landed on Juno Beach on 13 June 1944 (D+7), seven days after the 3rd Canadian Division had landed on D-Day. It was deployed in all major operations of the British Second Army, including Operations Epsom, Goodwood, and Bluecoat, and the battles around the Falaise Gap. The 11th Armoured Division, as part of the VIII Corps, was committed to action on 26 June 1944 as part of Operation Epsom. It entered the Scottish 'corridor', opened beforehand by the 15th (Scottish) Infantry Division. Despite mistakes in navigation, which slowed down the 159th Infantry Brigade in Mouen, the 11th managed to seize the bridges at Grainville and Colleville. It then progressed southward to Hill 112 (a dominant feature in the Normandy landscape near the village of Baron) and succeeded in capturing and holding this high ground against increasingly intense German counter-attacks. However, a renewed attack by fresh SS-Panzerdivisions transformed what was intended as a breakthrough into a battle for position. Before the German reinforcements could attack, General Bernard Montgomery ordered a withdrawal from the hilltop.

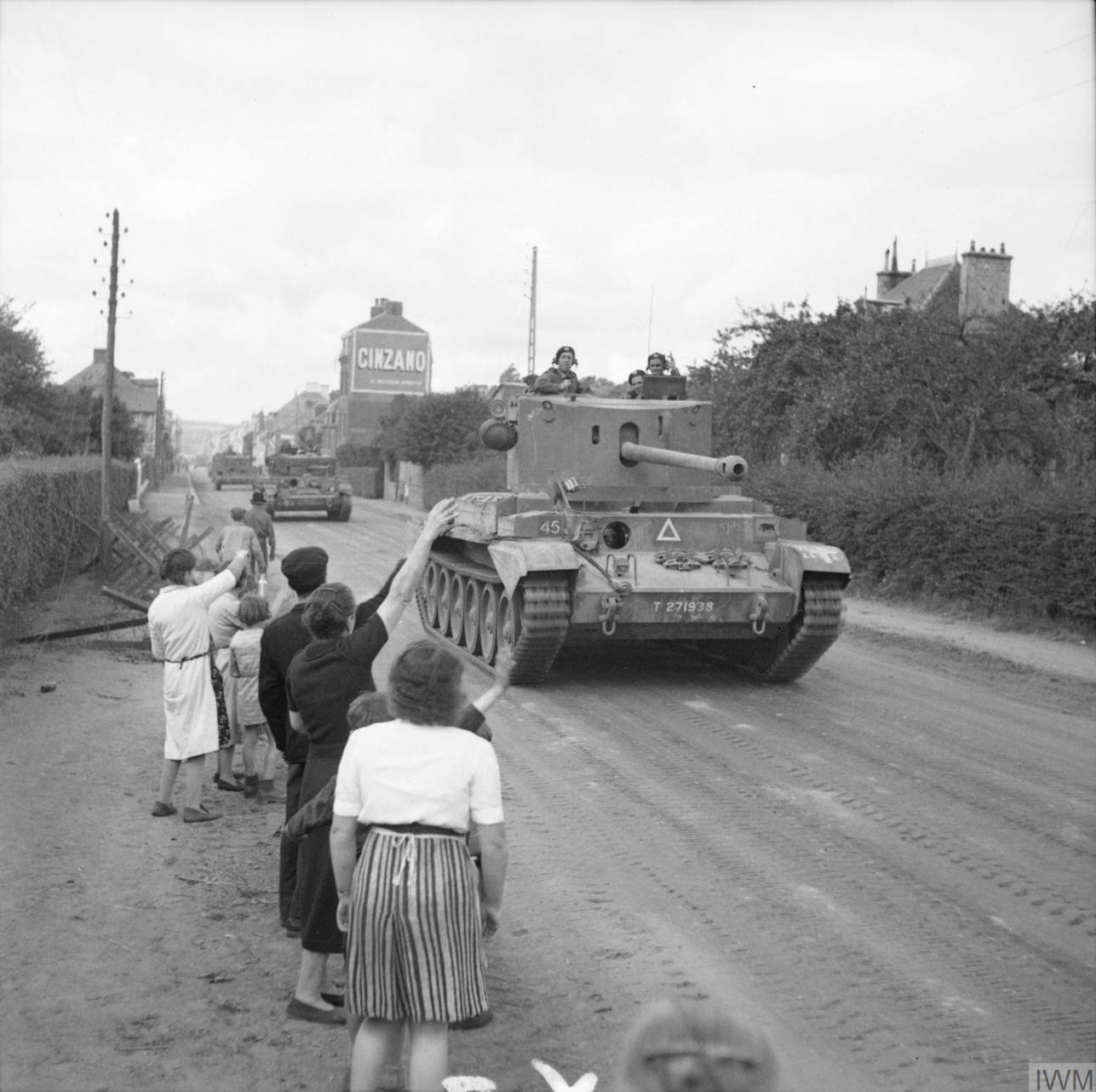
Challenger tanks of 2nd Northamptonshire Yeomanry, 11th Armoured Division, passing through Flers on 17 August 1944

The 11th Armoured was then moved to the east of Caen to spearhead Operation Goodwood. Planning and execution errors, coupled with strong German defences, led to a tactical British defeat. Goodwood was cancelled on 20 July, with the 11th Armoured being withdrawn from the front line to rest and refit. In only two days of fighting, it had lost 126 tanks.

The subsequent reorganization saw the 23rd Hussars absorb the remainder of the 24th Lancers.

The 11th Armoured was directed again to the west, to take part in Operation Bluecoat. Beginning on 30 July 1944 it seized Saint-Martin-des-Besaces. The division spotted an intact bridge on the Souleuvre river, which enabled it to drive the Germans back. In what became the famous "Charge of the Bull", the division liberated Le Bény-Bocage on 1 August and quickly progressed southward. Although severely weakened at that time, the German army remained ever-present and dangerous. From 5 August, The 11th Armoured worked with the Guards Armoured Division and 15th (Scottish) Infantry Division to push back a counter-attack of the 9th SS Panzer Division.

After being replaced by the 3rd Infantry Division, the 11th Armoured was attached to XXX Corps. It progressed eastward hard on the heels of the Germans, who were retreating after the failure of the Mortain counteroffensive. The sole memorial to the fallen of the division is at Pont de Vère, the location of a battle on 16 August against a German rearguard. The 11th Armoured seized Flers on 17 August. Once the battle for the Falaise gap was over, the 11th Armoured liberated L'Aigle on 23 August and crossed the Seine on 30 August.

=== Belgium and the Netherlands ===
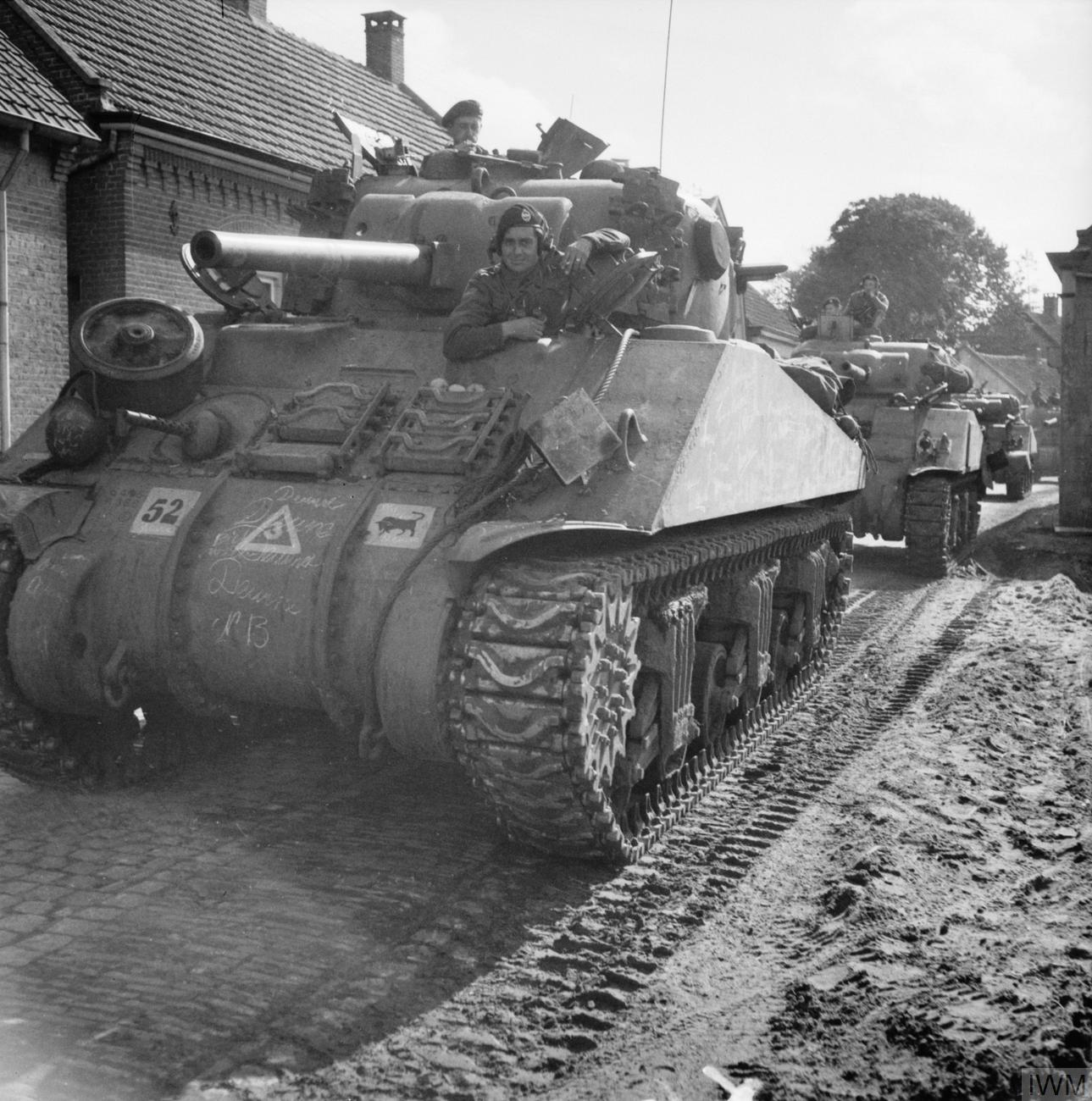
M4 Shermans of the 23rd Hussars advance through Deurne, 26 September 1944

After a night move, and an unprecedented advance of 60 miles in one day, the division liberated Amiens on 1 September. The same day, it captured General Heinrich Eberbach, commander of the Wehrmacht's German 7th Army. Advancing to Lens, then Tournai, the division was then committed to the fight for Antwerp, which it liberated on 4 September. Two days later, it tried to establish a bridgehead over the Albert Canal, but the attempt, due to intense enemy fire, was not successful. After this failure, 11th Armoured had to cross much further to the east, at Beringen. The division was not directly committed to Operation Market Garden. Instead, it was tasked with securing the right flank of the operation. Attached to VIII Corps, it began moving on 18 September. Advancing in two columns, it managed to reach the US 101st Airborne Division at Nuenen, while on the 22nd, its engineers established a bridge over the Zuid-Willemsvaart canal. The division could then make an encircling move around Helmond, forcing the Germans to withdraw on 25 September.

At the beginning of October, the division was employed in clearing pockets of German resistance remaining west of the Maas. The operation developed promisingly with 159th Infantry Brigade, battling its way across the Deurne canal. Unfortunately, the attack was quickly stopped by obstinate German resistance. Further delay was imposed by the growing supply shortage and the launching of an enemy counter-attack in the south. There was also a skillful German defence which postponed clearing of the Maas for several weeks. During this period the division came into contact with troops from the United States and the divisional sign was referred to as "the Swell Bison". On 16 October Sergeant George Harold Eardley of the 4th Battalion, King's Shropshire Light Infantry (from 159th Brigade) was awarded the Victoria Cross for bravery.

Preparations for a new crossing attempt were delayed until the second half of November. On the 22nd, 159th Brigade managed to cross and to seize the village of America. It progressed to Horst, before being relieved by units of the 15th (Scottish) Division. On 30 November, it attacked a fortress defended by German parachutists at the Battle of Broekhuizen. The enemy inflicted heavy losses, before capitulating on 5 December.

=== Ardennes to the Rhine ===
At the beginning of December 1944 units of the 11th Armoured Division were placed in reserve around Ypres. The start of the Battle of the Bulge modified British ambitions. Being one of few formations in reserve, the 11th Armoured was urgently recalled to active service with its old tanks and directed to hold a defensive line along the Meuse, between Namur and Givet. 29th Armoured Brigade played a significant role stopping the progress of German Battlegroup Böhm on 25 and 26 December 1944. Battlegroup Böhm had penetrated the furthest during the last German offensive in the West.

=== Lower Rhine ===
On 17 February 1945 the 159th Brigade was recalled to the front, to add its weight to the reinforce XXX Corps fighting in Operation Veritable (Lower Rhine region). The fights lasted longer and were more difficult than expected and, despite fairly limited involvement, suffered the highest exhaustion rates of any British or Canadian units involved. At the same time the 4th Armoured Brigade, under Brigadier Michael Carver, came under command of the division and left 8 March.

The infantry of the 11th Armoured later received orders to seize Gochfortzberg, south of Üdem, then to break the Schlieffen line and capture Sonsbeck, in order to support the II Canadian Corps which progressed towards Hochwald from the north (→ Operation Blockbuster). The brigade attack started on 26 February. Under challenging conditions, Gochfortzberg was seized on 28 February, Sonsbeck on 3 March.

=== Germany ===
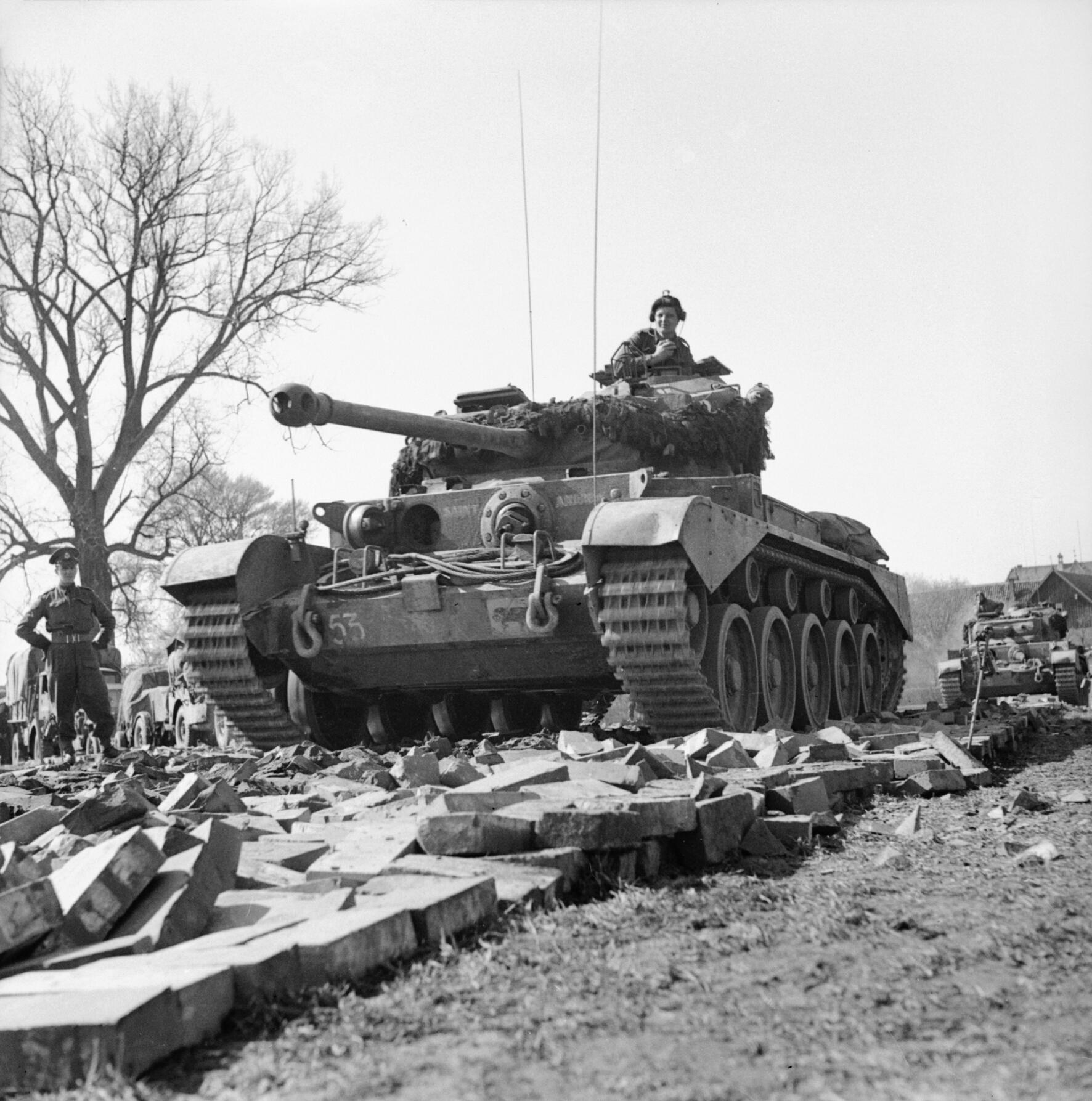
Comet tanks of the 2nd Fife and Forfar Yeomanry crossing the Weser at Petershagen, 7 April 1945

The 11th Armoured Division was held in reserve until 28 March 1945 when it crossed the Rhine at Wesel, heading for the river Weser. Despite sporadic pockets of resistance, it reached Gescher on the evening of 30 March. During the next few weeks the division worked closely with the British 6th Airborne Division, both of which were under command of Lieutenant-General Evelyn Barker's VIII Corps. 3 RTR arrived at the river Ems in Emsdetten; they then reached the Dortmund-Ems canal the following day. After crossing the canal on 1 April, the 11th Armoured approached Ibbenbüren and was heavily engaged on the heights of the Teutoburger Wald. The villages of Brochterbeck and Tecklenburg were captured, albeit at a high price. Further east, the wooded hills were defended by companies of NCOs, who savagely counter-attacked the 3rd Battalion, Monmouthshire Regiment. The intervention of the 2nd Battalion, Devonshire Regiment of the 131st Infantry Brigade, of the 7th Armoured Division, later on, made it possible to overcome their opposition, but the battalion, already weakened during previous campaigns, had to be replaced by the 1st Battalion, Cheshire Regiment and was transferred to the 115th Independent Infantry Brigade. The battalion had suffered over 1,100 casualties throughout the campaign, including 267 killed. It was during the same action the division was also awarded its second Victoria Cross of the war, belonging to Corporal Edward Thomas Chapman of the 2nd Monmouths.

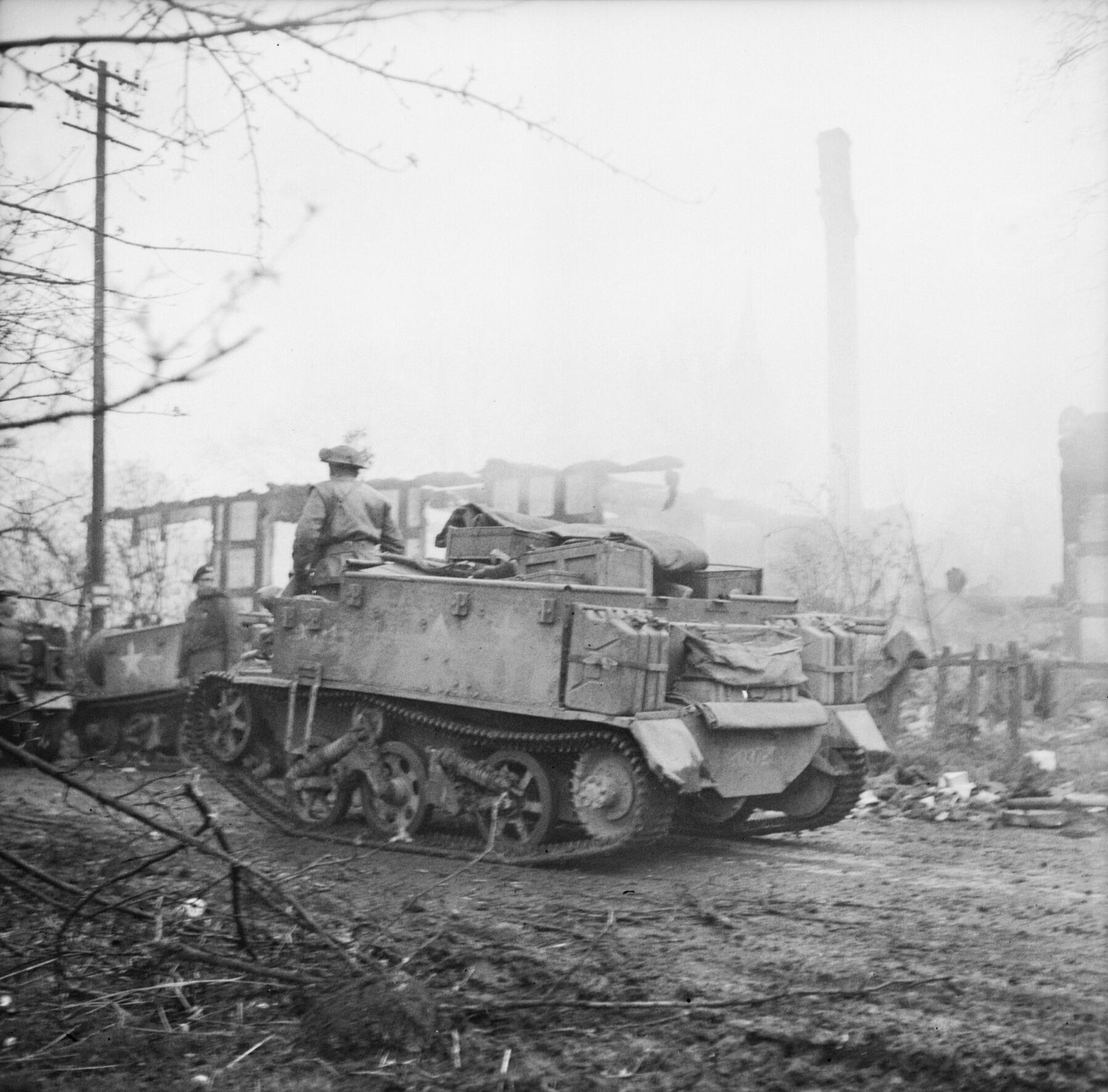
Universal Carriers of the 4th Battalion, King's Shropshire Light Infantry pass through the burning village of Levern, 4 April 1945

Divisional units continued toward the Osnabrück canal. After crossing via a captured bridge, it moved towards the Weser, reached by leading elements near Stolzenau on 5 April. A week later, the 11th Armoured liberated the Bergen-Belsen concentration camp. A local agreement with German commanders designed to prevent the spread of typhus made it possible to declare the neighbourhood of the camp a neutral area, and the fighting moved northeast. The division reached the river Elbe near Lüneburg on 18 April.

On 30 April 1945 the 11th Armoured Division launched their last attack. It crossed the Elbe at Artlenburg, then against little opposition, occupied Lübeck on 2 May and Neustadt on 3 May (Cap Arcona). It finished the war by patrolling the surrounding countryside, collecting 80,000 prisoners which included 27 Generals. After the German surrender, the 11th Armoured Division was used as an occupation force in the Schleswig-Holstein area. On 23 May, units of the division were employed in the capture of members of the Dönitz Government in Flensburg.

The 11th Armoured Division was disbanded shortly after the end of the war at the end of January 1946. During the campaign in northwestern Europe, from June 1944 until May 1945, the division had lost almost 2,000 officers and men killed in action and more than 8,000 wounded or missing in action.

=== Post war ===
The 11th Armoured Division was reformed in the autumn of 1950, but was then converted into the 4th Infantry Division in April 1956.

== Order of battle ==
11th Armoured Division was constituted as follows during the Second World War:

29th Armoured Brigade
24th Lancers (left 6 February 1944)
23rd Hussars
2nd Fife and Forfar Yeomanry (from 7 June 1941)
3rd Royal Tank Regiment (from 6 February 1944)
8th Battalion, Rifle Brigade (Prince Consort's Own)
30th Armoured Brigade (left 20 April 1942)
22nd Dragoons
Westminster Dragoons
1st Lothians and Border Horse
2nd Battalion, Queen's Westminsters (renamed 25 March 1941)
12th (Queen's Westminsters) Battalion, King's Royal Rifle Corps (from 25 March 1941)
11th Support Group (disbanded 1 June 1942)
13th Regiment, Royal Horse Artillery (Honourable Artillery Company) (to Divisional Troops on 31 May 1942)
75th Anti-Tank Regiment, Royal Artillery (to Divisional Troops on 31 May 1942)
58th (Argyll and Sutherland Highlanders) Light Anti-Aircraft Regiment, Royal Artillery (from 7 May 1941, to Divisional Troops on 31 May 1942)
8th Battalion, Royal Ulster Rifles (left 8 May 1941)
12th Battalion, Green Howards (from 9 May 1941, left 8 May 1942)
159th Infantry Brigade (from 1 June 1942)
4th Battalion, King's Shropshire Light Infantry
3rd Battalion, Monmouthshire Regiment (left 3 April 1945)
1st Battalion, Herefordshire Regiment
1st Battalion, Cheshire Regiment (from 6 April 1945)
Divisional troops
2nd Independent Machine Gun Company (Machine Gun Company, from 16 March 1944)
27th Lancers (Reconnaissance Regiment, from 10 March 1941, left 25 March 1943)
2nd Northamptonshire Yeomanry (Reconnaissance Regiment, from 25 March 1943, disbanded 17 August 1944)
15th/19th The King's Royal Hussars (Reconnaissance Regiment, from 17 August 1944)
13th Regiment, Royal Horse Artillery (Honourable Artillery Company) (from 1 June 1942)
151st (Ayrshire Yeomanry) Field Regiment, Royal Artillery
75th Anti-Tank Regiment, Royal Artillery (from 1 June 1942, left 2 June 1945)
65th (Norfolk Yeomanry) Anti-Tank Regiment, Royal Artillery (from 2 June 1945)
58th (Argyll and Sutherland Highlanders) Light Anti-Aircraft Regiment, Royal Artillery (from 1 June 1942)
12th Field Squadron, Royal Engineers (from 16 March 1941, left 1 January 1943)
13th Field Squadron, Royal Engineers (from 16 March 1941)
612th Field Squadron, Royal Engineers (from 1 January 1943)
147th Field Park Squadron, Royal Engineers (from 16 March 1941)
10th Bridging Platoon, Royal Engineers (from 1 October 1943)
11th Armoured Division Postal Unit, Royal Engineers
11th Armoured Divisional Signals Regiment, Royal Corps of Signals

An Inns of Court Regiment armoured car squadron was attached to most 11th Armoured Division operations.

== Commanders ==
Commanders included:

Appointed	General officer commanding
9 March 1941	Major-General Percy Hobart
22 February 1942	Brigadier Christopher Peto (acting)
21 April 1942	Major-General Charles Keightley
17 May 1942	Major-General Percy Hobart
15 October 1942	Major-General Brocas Burrows
6 December 1943	Major-General Philip Roberts
1950	Major-General Henry Foote
1953	Major-General Harold Pyman
1955	Major-General John Anderson
March 1956	Major-General Reginald Hewetson

== See also ==
- List of British divisions in World War II
- British Armoured formations of World War II
