= Philip Roberts (British Army officer) =

British Army general (1906–1997)

Major-General Philip Roberts CB DSO** MC
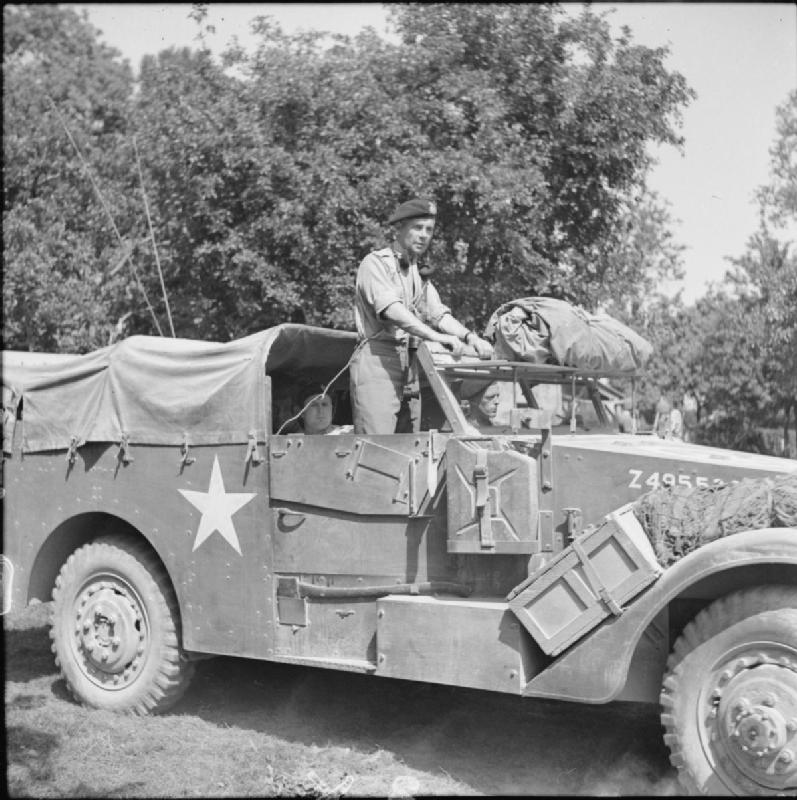
- Roberts, GOC 11th Armoured Division, in his White Scout Car, in Normandy, August 1944
- Born: 5 November 1906; Quetta, British India
- Died: 5 November 1997 (aged 91); East Sussex, England
- Military career
- Allegiance: United Kingdom
- Branch: British Army
- Service years: 1926–1949
- Rank: Major-General
- Nickname: "Pip"
- Service number: 34890
- Unit: Royal Tank Regiment
- Commands: 2nd Infantry Division (1947–1949); 7th Armoured Division (1946–47); 11th Armoured Division (1943–46); 30th Armoured Brigade (1943); 26th Armoured Brigade (1943); 22nd Armoured Brigade (1942–43); 3rd Royal Tank Regiment (1942)
- Conflicts: Second World War
- Awards: Companion of the Order of the Bath; Distinguished Service Order & Two Bars; Military Cross; Mentioned in Despatches (3); Legion of Honour (France); Croix de guerre (France)
- Other work: Director of Scribbans-Kemp (1949–64); Honorary Colonel Kent and County of London Yeomanry Squadron (1962–70); Justice of the Peace (1960–70)

Major-General George Philip Bradley Roberts, CB, DSO & Two Bars, MC (5 November 1906 – 5 November 1997), better known as "Pip", was a senior officer of the British Army who served with distinction during the Second World War, most notably as General Officer Commanding of the 11th Armoured Division (nicknamed the "Black Bull") throughout the campaign in Northwestern Europe from June 1944 until Victory in Europe Day (VE-Day) in May 1945. Roberts, in the words of Richard Mead, "possessed strong leadership, an instinctive tactical flair and the intellectual appreciation of what was needed to succeed, becoming as a result the outstanding British armoured commander of the War."

== Early life ==
Roberts was born in Quetta, British India, on 5 November 1906, the son of a British Army officer, and was educated at Marlborough College and the Royal Military College, Sandhurst.

== Military career ==
After passing out from Sandhurst, Roberts was commissioned into the Royal Tank Corps (later the Royal Tank Regiment) of the British Army on 4 February 1926. He was posted to Egypt with his regiment from 1928 to 1931, during which time he was promoted to lieutenant on 4 February 1929.

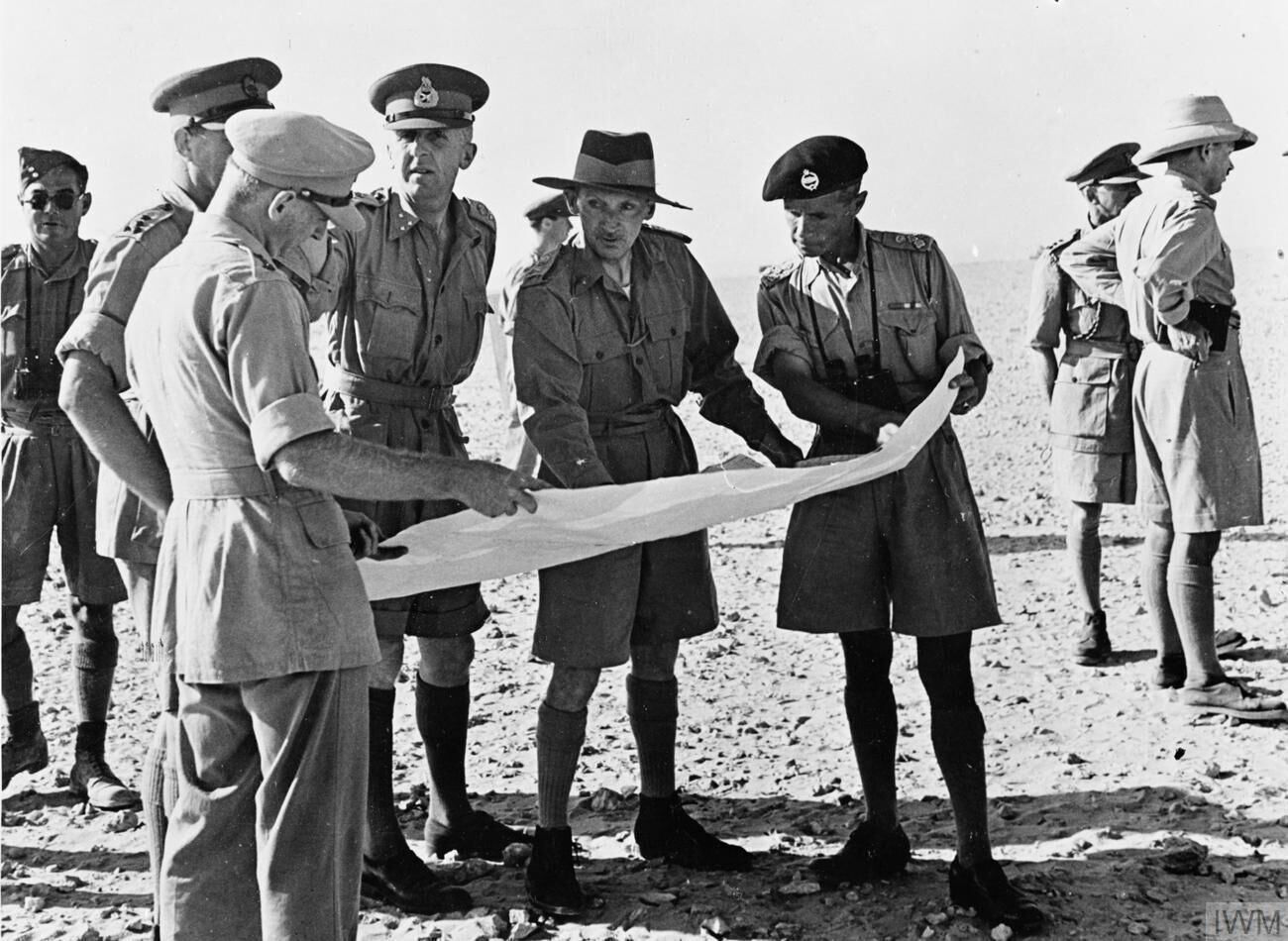
Lieutenant-General Bernard Montgomery, the new commander of the British Eighth Army, and Lieutenant-General Brian Horrocks, the new GOC XIII Corps, discussing troop dispositions at 22nd Armoured Brigade HQ, 20 August 1942. The brigade commander, Brigadier "Pip" Roberts is on the right (in beret).

Roberts was an instructor at the Tank Driving and Maintenance School at Bovington, Dorset, from 1933 to 1937. He was again posted to Egypt for 1938 and 1939. In late December 1938 he was serving as adjutant of the 6th Royal Tank Regiment, a position he was still in by the outbreak of the Second World War in September 1939.

By July 1942, he was commanding the 22nd Armoured Brigade, which he led in the Battle of Alam el Halfa and the Second Battle of El Alamein, before he was transferred in mid-March 1943 to the 26th Armoured Brigade, part of Major-General Charles Keightley's 6th Armoured Division. Roberts led the brigade in the final stages of the Tunisian campaign until the Axis powers surrendered in mid-May. He was mentioned in despatches on 15 December 1942, and was awarded a bar to his Distinguished Service Order (DSO) on 28 January 1943, following which, in February 1943, his rank of major was confirmed, and he was awarded a second bar to his DSO on 8 July 1943, a "rare honour".

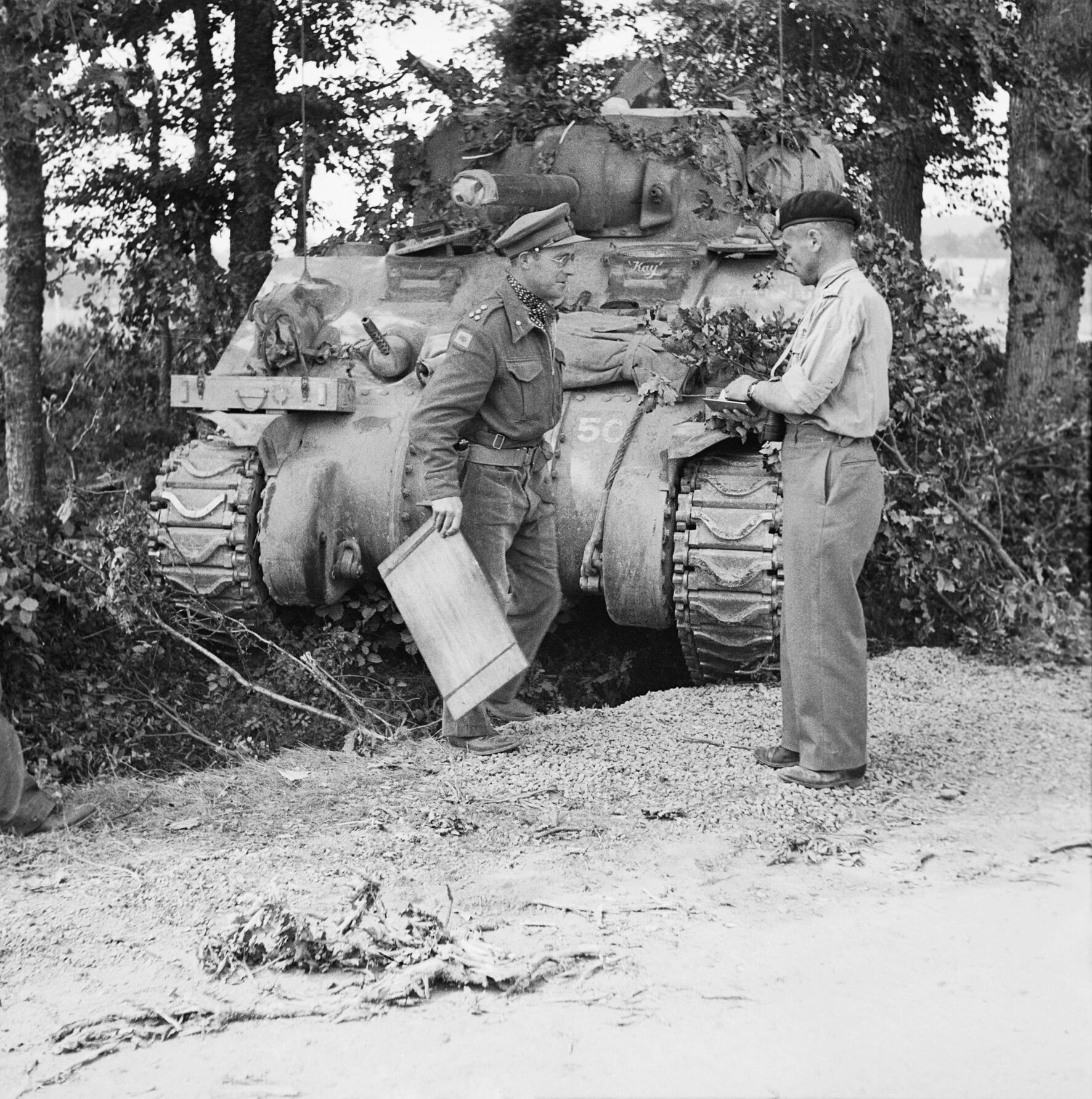
Major-General "Pip" Roberts (right) with Brigadier C. B. C. "Roscoe" Harvey, commanding the 29th Armoured Brigade, Normandy, 15 August 1944.

In June 1943, Roberts handed over the 26th Armoured Brigade to Brigadier Richard Hull and was posted back to the United Kingdom, where for six months he commanded the 30th Armoured Brigade, part of Major-General Percy Hobart's 79th Armoured Division. The 79th Armoured was not a typical division as it had recently been reorganised to control all the specialised armour in the Anglo-Canadian 21st Army Group and was more popularly known as Hobart's Funnies. Roberts's brigade was soon equipped with Sherman Crab tanks with mounted flails for the purpose of clearing mines, and he himself was able to observe the capabilities of the armoured fighting vehicles which would later assist him in future operations.

By now recognised as an expert in armoured warfare, Roberts was, at the age of just thirty-seven years and one month old, promoted to acting major-general on 6 December 1943 and became General Officer Commanding (GOC) of the 11th Armoured Division (the "Black Bull"), taking over from Major-General Brocas Burrows. Of the British general officers of the Second World War, only Robert Laycock was younger. He was to lead the division in North West Europe from 1944 to 1945.

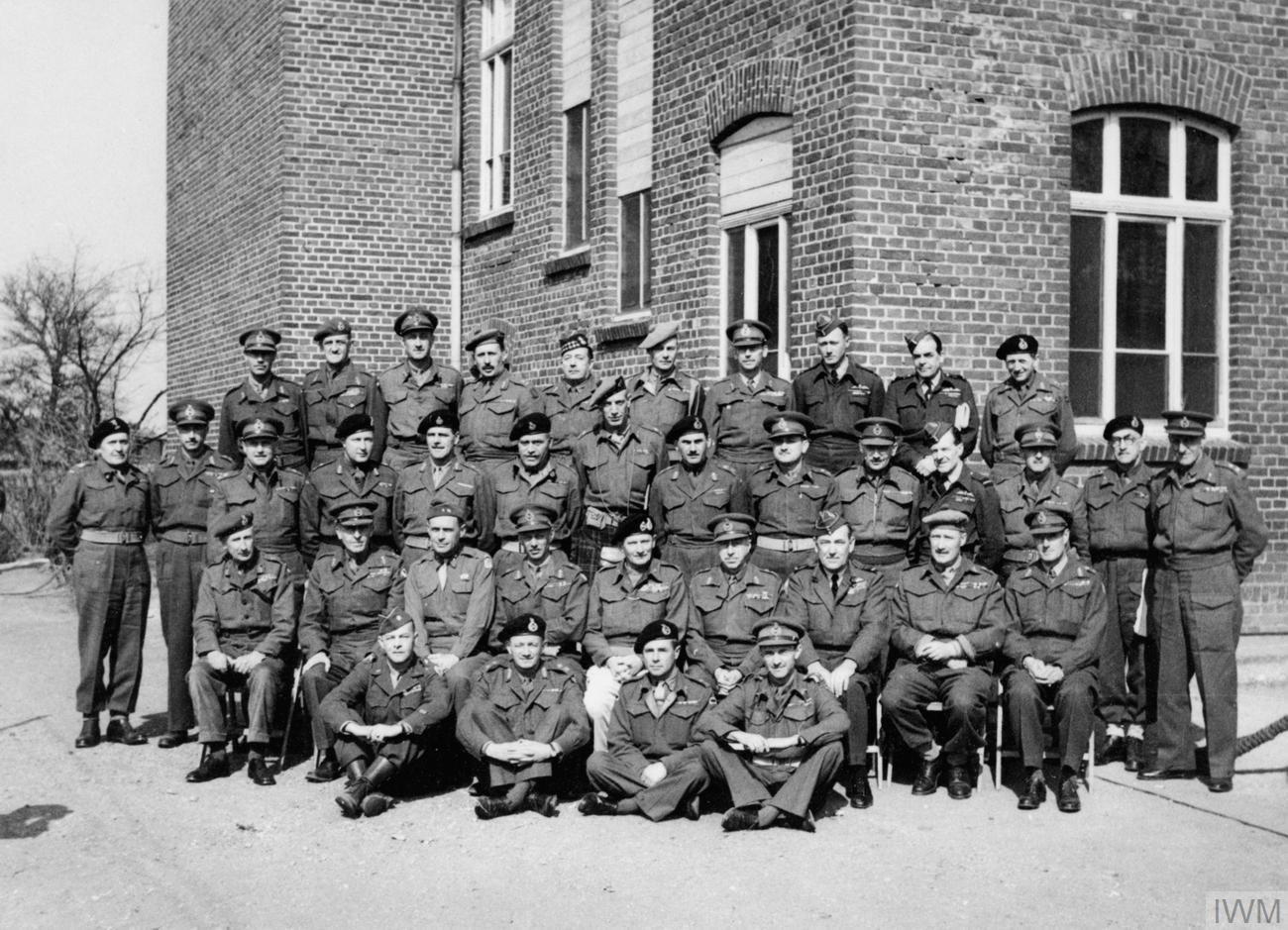
Field Marshal Sir Bernard Montgomery poses for a group photograph with members of his staff, along with his corps and division commanders, at Walbeck, Germany, 22 March 1945. Pictured sitting on the floor, second from the left, is Major-General "Pip" Roberts.

Landing in Normandy, France, shortly after the D-Day landings on 6 June 1944, Roberts's division was engaged in the Battle of Normandy, most notably in Operation Epsom in late June, followed in mid-July by Operation Goodwood, then in Operation Bluecoat. Following the German collapse in Normandy after the Battle of the Falaise Pocket, the 11th Armoured Division, at the River Seine on 28 August, was in Amiens just three days later, arriving at Antwerp on 3 September, five years since the beginning of the war. His rank of major-general was made temporary (from acting major-general) on 6 December 1944. Playing only a minor role in Operation Market Garden late September 1944, the division was involved in the Battle of the Bulge (December−January 1945) and Operation Veritable in February–March 1945. The division crossed the River Rhine in late March and participated in the Western Allied invasion of Germany, in the process liberating the Bergen-Belsen concentration camp in mid-April and entering Lübeck in early May. Victory in Europe Day followed soon afterwards. Roberts was made a Companion of the Order of the Bath on 1 February 1945, and was Mentioned in Despatches on 9 August 1945.

Roberts unsuccessfully stood as the Conservative Party candidate for Wimbledon at the July 1945 general election.

Roberts commanded the 7th Armoured Division in 1946. His rank of major-general was confirmed on 18 June (with seniority backdated to 24 March 1945). He then became took command of the 2nd Infantry Division (trading places with Philip Balfour and held that position until 1949. He was then Director of the Royal Armoured Corps and retired from the British Army on 11 September 1949.

His book From the Desert to the Baltic is an account of all his wartime battles. His final years were spent in Sussex, where he died on his 91st birthday on 5 November 1997.

== Publications ==
- Roberts, Major General George Philip Bradley (1987). From the Desert to the Baltic. William Kimber. ISBN 978-0718306397.

== Bibliography ==
- Mead, Richard (2007). Churchill's Lions: A Biographical Guide to the Key British Generals of World War II. Stroud: Spellmount. ISBN 978-1-86227-431-0.
- Smart, Nick (2005). Biographical Dictionary of British Generals of the Second World War. Barnsley, South Yorkshire: Pen and Sword Books. ISBN 1844150496.
- Stewart, Adrian (2011). Six of Monty's Men. Barnsley: Pen and Sword. ISBN 978-1-84884-371-4. OCLC 679923542.

Military offices
Preceded by Brocas Burrows	GOC 11th Armoured Division; 1943–1946	Post disbanded
Preceded by Lewis Lyne	GOC 7th Armoured Division; 1946–1947	Philip Balfour
Preceded by Philip Balfour	GOC 2nd Infantry Division; 1947–1949	Colin Callander
