= Macclesfield Cemetery =

Cemetery Cheshire, England

Coordinates: 53.2669°N 2.1404°W

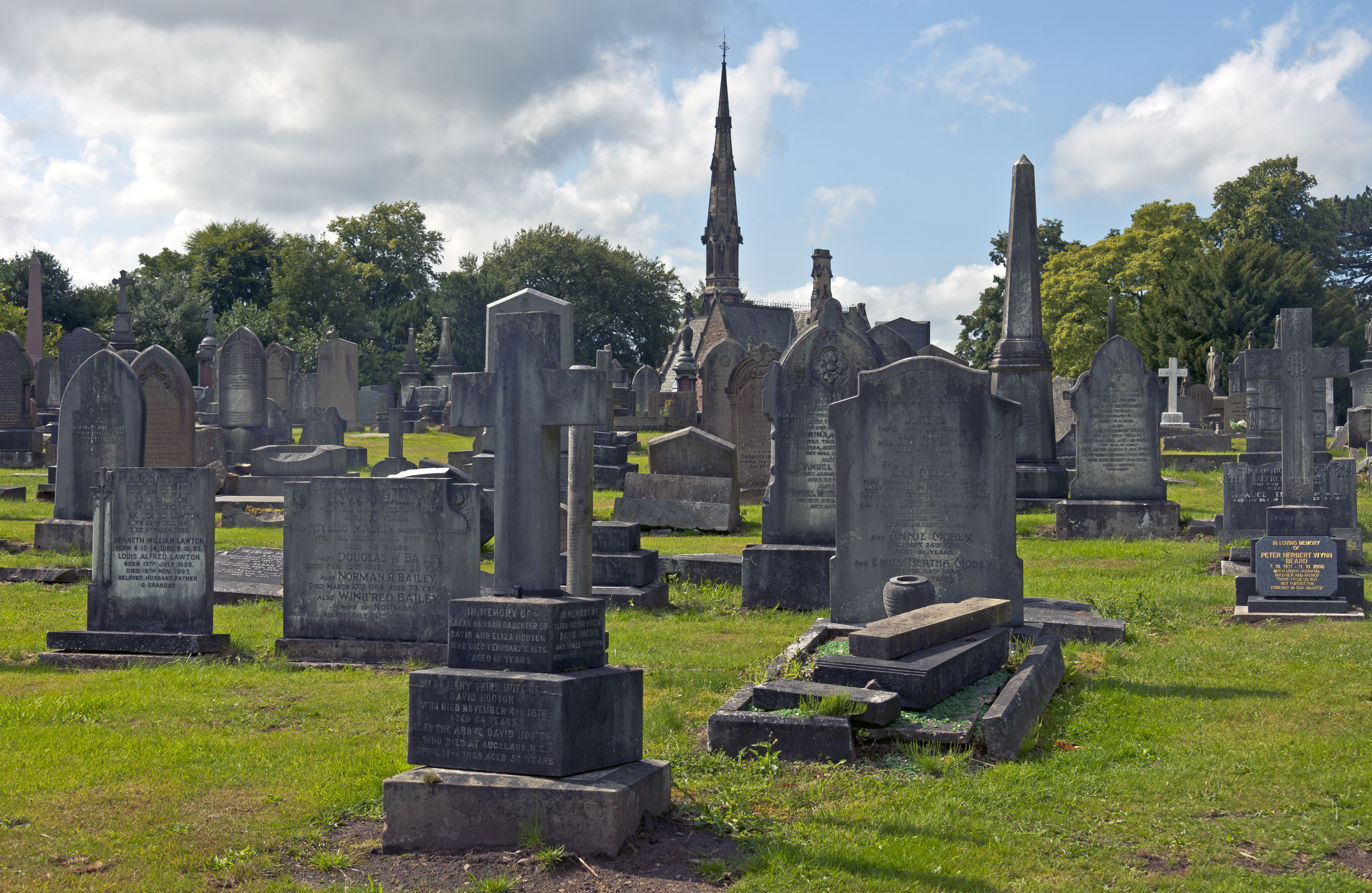
Cemetery and chapel

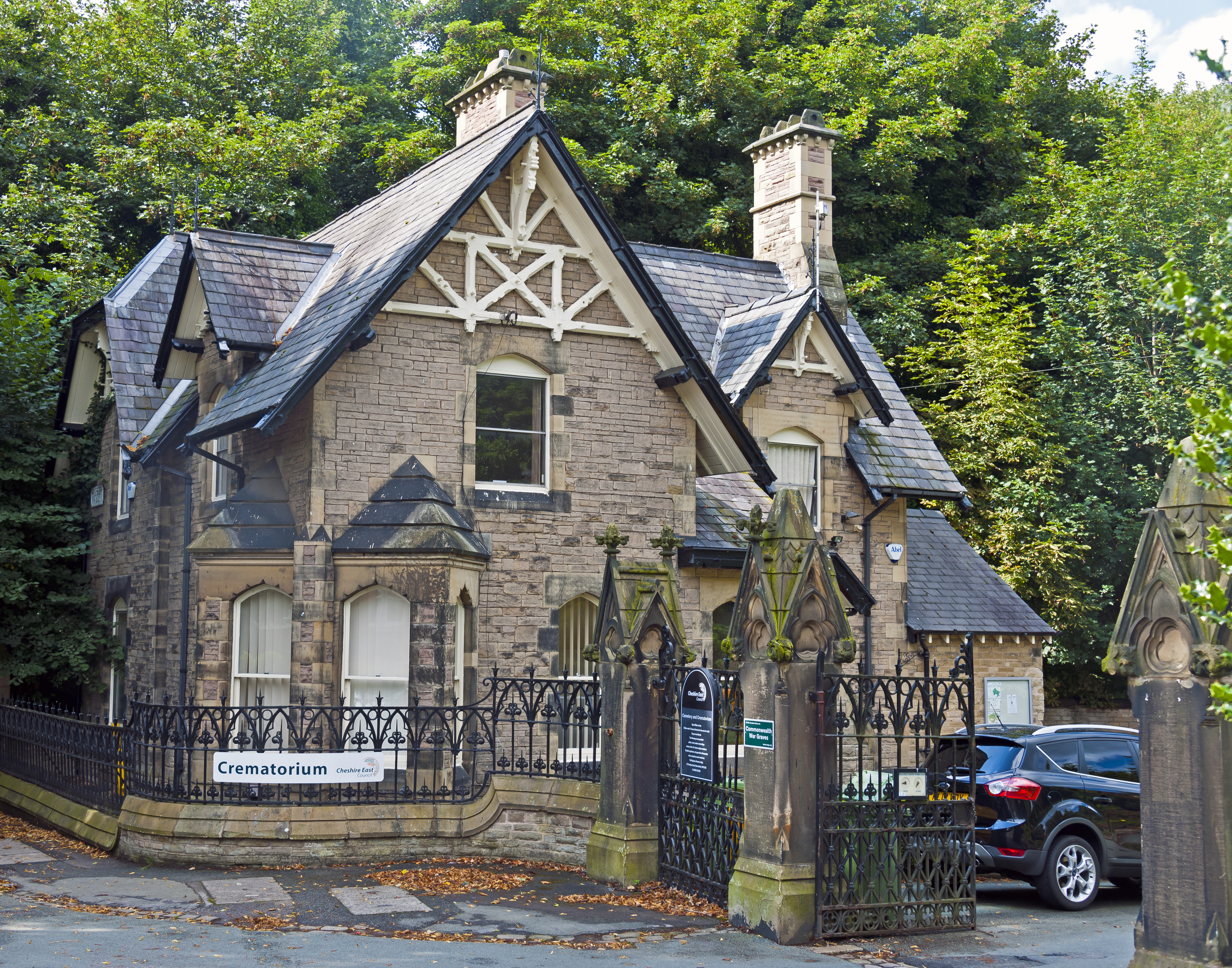
Gates and lodge, also listed

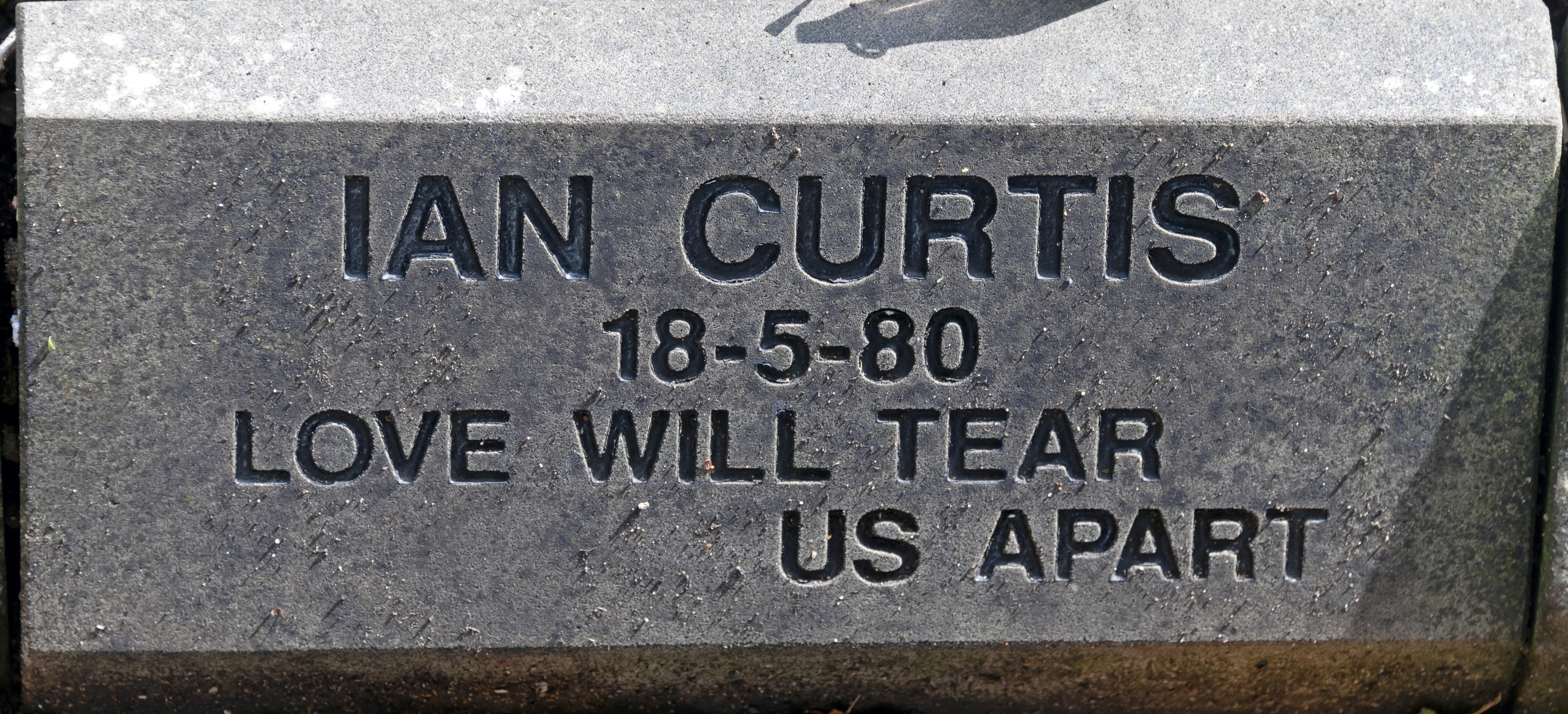
Ian Curtis's grave marker

Macclesfield Cemetery, is a Victorian cemetery located on Prestbury Road, Macclesfield, Cheshire, England. It was opened on 17 May 1866 and consists of 68 acres (28 ha) of land including gardens of remembrance, cemetery walks take place three times a year. The site contains three chapels, terrace walks overlooking a stream and examples of monumental stone masonry. Macclesfield Crematorium is located within the grounds, the cemetery lodge is on Prestbury Road.

== Old Chapel ==
The Old Chapel was the Church of England chapel for the cemetery. It was built in the 1866 and is in the Neo-Gothic style. The chapel is no longer used for services and is now used as office space. It is a Grade II listed building.

== War graves ==
There are 82 Commonwealth service personnel buried in this cemetery, 49 from World War I and 33 from World War II.

== Notable interments ==
- Ian Curtis, (cremated) musician.
- George Harold Eardley, (cremated) World War II Victoria Cross recipient.
