= George Harold Eardley =

English Victoria Cross recipient (1912–1991)

George Harold Eardley VC MM
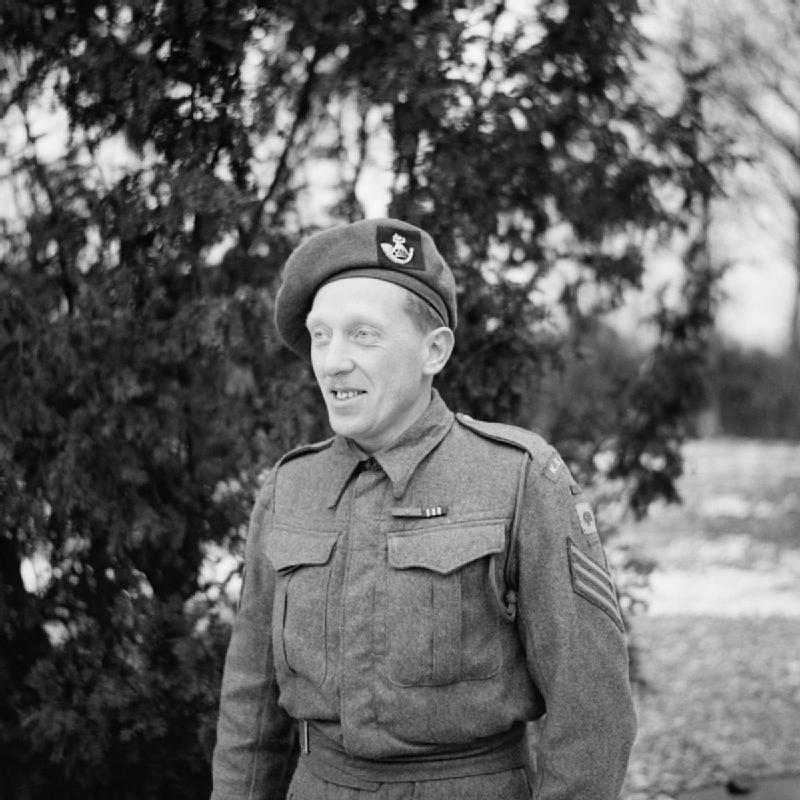
- Born: 6 May 1912; Congleton, Cheshire, England
- Died: 11 September 1991 (aged 79); Congleton, Cheshire, England
- Burial place: Macclesfield Cemetery, Macclesfield, Cheshire, England
- Children: 3
- Military career
- Allegiance: United Kingdom
- Branch: British Army
- Service years: 1940–1950
- Rank: Company Sergeant Major
- Nickname: Killer
- Service number: 6092111
- Units: Queen's Royal Regiment (West Surrey); King's Shropshire Light Infantry
- Conflicts: World War II
- Awards: Victoria Cross; Military Medal; 1939-1945 Star (Note: Source:Photo of Medals awarded to George Harold Eardley at Congleton Museum photo in Awards and Honours section); France and Germany Star (Note: Source:Photo of Medals awarded to George Harold Eardley at Congleton Museum photo in Awards and Honours section); Defence Medal (Note: Source:Photo of Medals awarded to George Harold Eardley at Congleton Museum photo in Awards and Honours section); 1939-1945 Medal (Note: Source:Photo of Medals awarded to George Harold Eardley at Congleton Museum photo in Awards and Honours section); Croix de Guerre (???); Elizabeth II Coronation Medal (Note: Source:Photo of Medals awarded to George Harold Eardley at Congleton Museum photo in Awards and Honours section); Elizabeth II Silver Jubilee Medal (Note: Source:Photo of Medals awarded to George Harold Eardley at Congleton Museum photo in Awards and Honours section)

Company Sergeant Major George Harold Eardley VC, MM (6 May 1912 – 11 September 1991) was a British Army soldier and an English recipient of the Victoria Cross (VC), the highest award for gallantry in the face of the enemy that can be awarded to British and Commonwealth forces. Brother of Arnold Eardley and Elgin Eardley.

== Biography ==
Eardley was 32 years old, and an acting sergeant in the 4th Battalion, King's Shropshire Light Infantry, British Army during the Second World War when he was awarded the VC.

On 16 October 1944, east of Overloon, the Netherlands, Sergeant Eardley's platoon was ordered to clear some orchards where a strong opposition was holding up the advance, but 80 yards (73 m) away from the objective the platoon was halted by automatic fire from machine-gun posts. Sergeant Eardley spotted one of these posts and moving forward under heavy fire killed the occupants at the post with a grenade. He went on to destroy two more posts single-handed, under fire so intense that it daunted those who were with him, but his action enabled the platoon to achieve its objective and thus ensured the success of the whole attack.

He later was appointed company sergeant major (CSM).

In June 1964 Eardley was involved in a car crash, the crash killed his first wife Winfred. Eardley survived the crash, but he had to have a limb amputated.

Following the death of his first wife Winfred, Eardley would later marry Nancy Barnett whom Eardley had dated during his teenage years.

Eardley died on 11 September aged 79, he was survived by his second wife Nancy and one of his children.

Eardley was interred at Macclesfield Cemetery in Cheshire.

== Medals and Honours ==
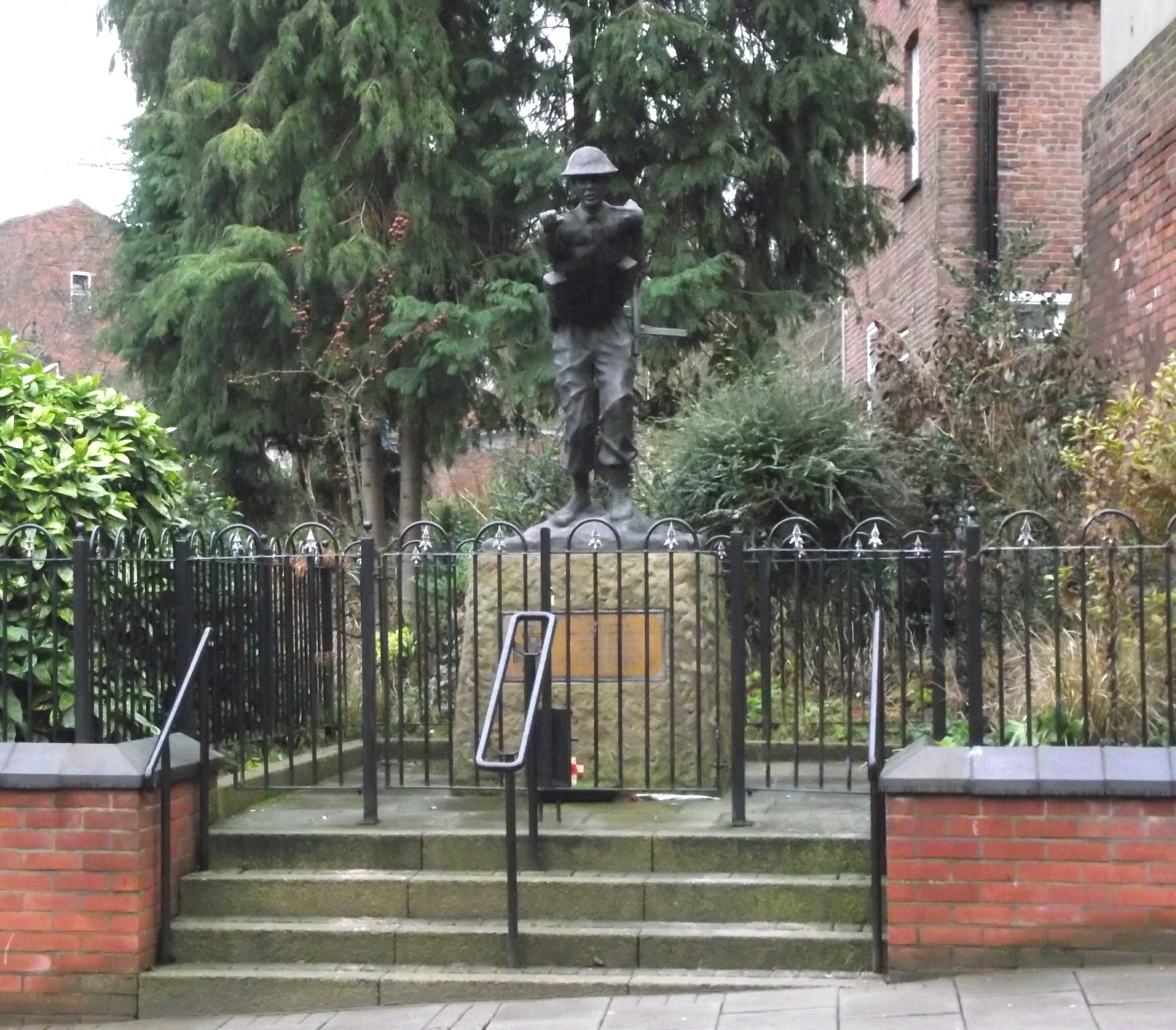
Statue of George Harold Eardley VC MM in Congleton

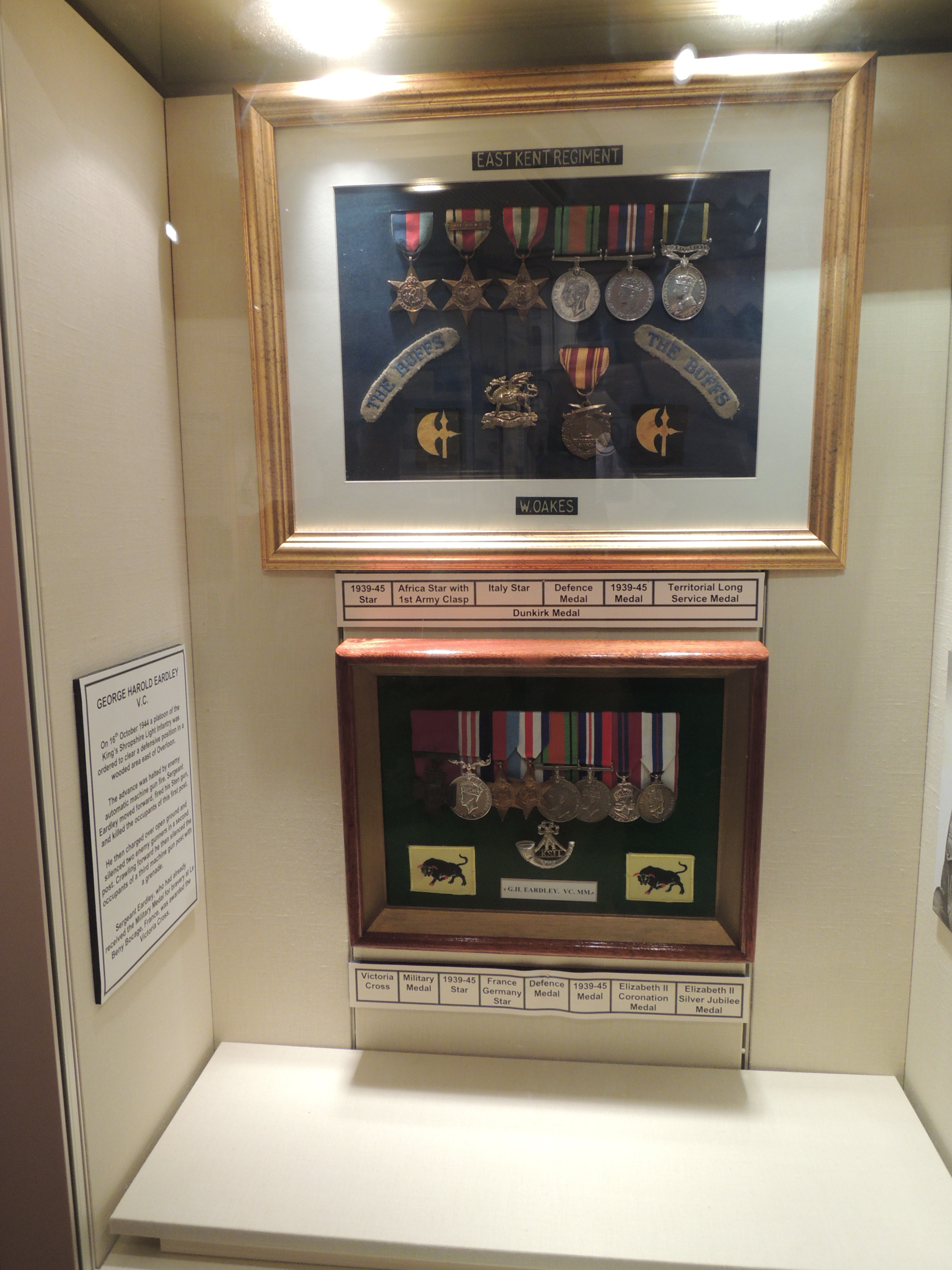
Medals awarded to George Harold Eardley VC MM on display in Congleton Museum

George Harold Eardley VC MM was awarded the following medals:

- Victoria Cross
- Military Medal
- 1939-1945 Star
- France and Germany Star
- Defence Medal
- 1939-1945 Medal
- Croix de Guerre
- Elizabeth II Coronation Medal
- Elizabeth II Silver Jubilee Medal

A statue was erected in his home town of Congleton on 18 April 2004.

== See also ==
- List of Second World War Victoria Cross recipients
