= George Johnson (British Army officer) =

British Army general (1903–1980)

Major-General Sir George Johnson KCVO CB CBE DSO DL
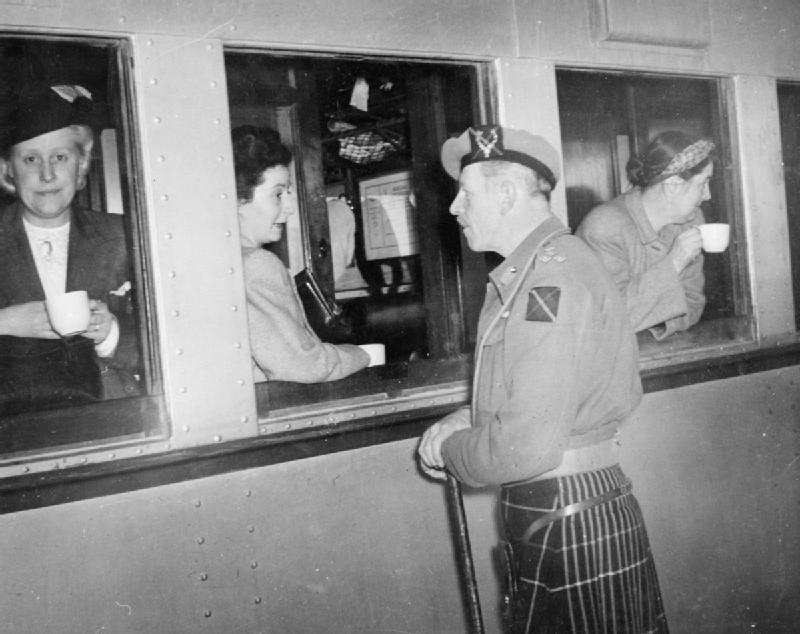
- Brigadier Johnson, who commanded Operation Polly (the evacuation of all non-essential personnel from Palestine) has a word with an evacuee who is about to leave Lydda station on the last evacuation train for Egypt
- Born: 28 November 1903; Walton, Cumberland
- Died: 23 July 1980 (aged 76); Walton, Cumberland
- Military career
- Allegiance: United Kingdom
- Branch: British Army
- Service years: 1925–1957
- Rank: Major-General
- Service number: 28480
- Unit: Scots Guards
- Commands: London District; 1st Guards Brigade; 32nd Guards Brigade; 201st Guards Motor Brigade Group; 3rd Battalion, Scots Guards
- Conflicts: Arab revolt in Palestine; Second World War; Palestine Emergency
- Awards: Knight Commander of the Royal Victorian Order; Companion of the Order of the Bath; Commander of the Order of the British Empire; Distinguished Service Order

Major-General Sir George Frederick Johnson, KCVO, CB, CBE, DSO, DL (28 November 1903 – 23 July 1980) was a senior British Army officer who fought in the Second World War and was Major-General commanding the Household Brigade and general officer commanding London District.

== Early life and education ==
Johnson was born at Castlesteads House in Walton, Cumberland, to Frederick Ponsonby Johnson and Frances Mary Gray, daughter of William Gray. Sir Frederick Hankey was his grandfather and Sir Robert Johnson was a cousin. He was educated at Eton College and King's College, Cambridge.

== Military career ==
He entered the Royal Military College, Sandhurst and was commissioned as a second lieutenant into the Scots Guards in 1925. Promoted to lieutenant on 28 November 1925, he attended the Staff College, Camberley, from 1934 to 1935. He then served in Palestine during the Arab revolt as a General Staff Officer Grade 3 (GSO3) with the 5th Division, before appointed a GSO at London District in 1939.

He served in the Second World War, becoming commanding officer (CO) of the 3rd Battalion, Scots Guards in 1940. He went on to be commander of 201st Guards Motor Brigade Group and was captured while fighting in the Western Desert Campaign in North Africa in 1942 and became a prisoner of war in Italy, but escaped in 1943. In December 1943 he succeeded Brigadier John Marriott in command of the 32nd Guards Brigade, part of Major General Allan Adair's Guards Armoured Division, commanding the brigade throughout the campaign in North West Europe from 1944 to 1945.

In July 1945, he handed over the brigade to Brigadier Joe Vandeleur and commanded the Scots Guards and then became commander of the 1st Guards Brigade in Palestine during the Palestine Emergency in 1947. In 1949 he was made chief of staff at Scottish Command and in 1953 he was appointed major-general commanding the Household Brigade and general officer commanding (GOC) London District. He retired in 1957.

He lived at Castlesteads near Brampton in Cumbria. He was appointed High Sheriff of Cumberland for 1966.

== Family ==
In 1938, he married Lady Ida Mary Ramsay, daughter of the 14th Earl Dalhousie, at Brechin Cathedral. They received a silver bowl from King George VI and Queen Elizabeth as a wedding present. They had one daughter and two sons.

Military offices
Preceded by Sir Julian Gascoigne	GOC London District; 1953–1957	Succeeded by Sir Rodney Moore
