= 22nd Guards Brigade =

Infantry brigade of the British Army

22nd Guards Brigade 200th Guards Brigade 201st Guards Motor Brigade
- Active: 1939–1946
- Country: United Kingdom
- Branch: British Army
- Type: Infantry
- Size: Brigade
- Garrison/HQ: Mersa Matruh
- Engagements: Tobruk, Battle of Gazala, Medenine, Mareth Akarit, Enfidaville, Tunis, Salerno, Capture of Naples, Volturno Crossing, Monte Cassino, Garigliano Crossing

The 22nd Guards Brigade was an infantry brigade of the British Army that saw distinguished active service during the Second World War.

== History ==
The 22nd Infantry Brigade was formed by the renaming of the 29th Infantry Brigade on 3 September 1939 and in March 1940 became responsible for all the troops in the Mersa Matruh Garrison area. In February 1941 the unit was reformed and named the 22nd Guards Brigade on 20 March 1941. It was converted to the 200th Guards Brigade (14 January 1942) and then finally the 201st Guards Motor Brigade Group (25 May 1942).

The 201st Guards Brigade saw extensive service in the North African Campaign, in Operation Crusader in late 1941 and later the Battle of Gazala, where it was forced to surrender on 20 June 1942 when Tobruk was captured by German and Italian forces, although some men managed to escape capture. The brigade was reformed, as the 201st Guards Brigade, under the command of Brigadier Julian Gascoigne in Egypt on 14 August 1942 and spent the next few months training there, before being sent to Syria in September where it trained as a motorised infantry brigade, with each of the battalions (the 6th Grenadier Guards, from England, and 3rd Coldstream Guards and 2nd Scots Guards, both veterans) composed of only three rifle companies.

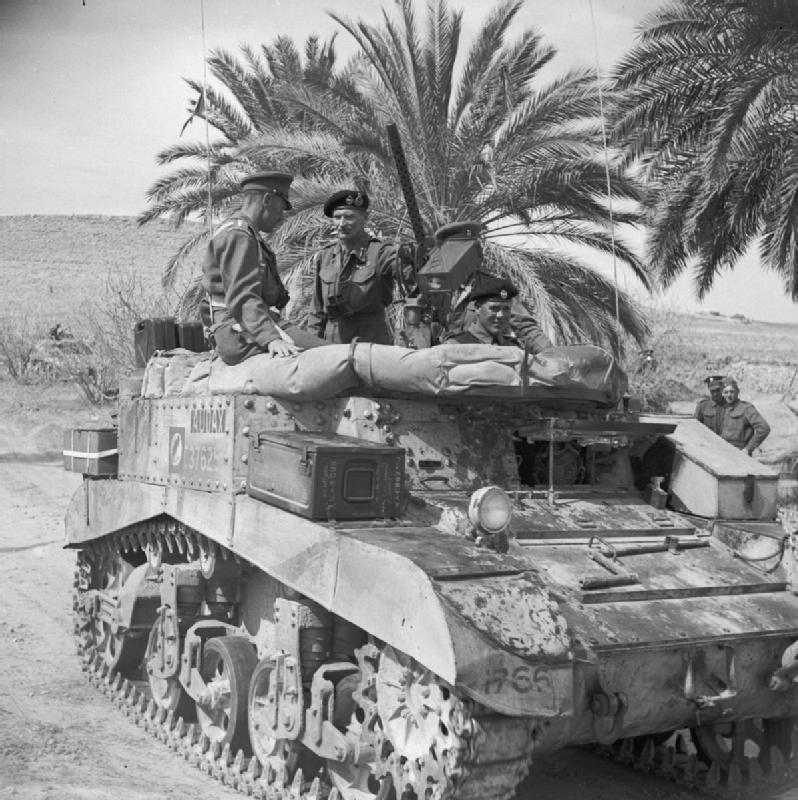
General Bernard Montgomery with Lieutenant Colonel A. C. Clive of the Grenadier Guards in a turretless Stuart command tank, 8 March 1943.

In early February 1943 the brigade was ordered to Tunisia to become part of XXX Corps of the Eighth Army. The brigade's first action in the Tunisian Campaign, which was nearing its end, was during the Battle of the Mareth Line in March. The battle, the first for the inexperienced 6th Grenadiers, was disastrous. Ordered to attack an objective named Horseshoe Ridge, which was believed to be lightly held, the Grenadiers, supported by a very heavy artillery barrage and advancing with all three companies, suffered 70 per cent casualties, mainly from anti-personnel mines and mortars, but managed to take the ridge, and all three companies fired Very lights to announce the capture of their objective. To reinforce the forward companies, and aware that his men had suffered severely in the minefields, the Grenadiers' commanding officer (CO), Lieutenant Colonel Clive, ordered the battalion's Universal Carriers to clear a way through the minefield, thus making it easier to reinforce the forward companies but the carriers were destroyed.

The Germans launched numerous counterattacks, which forced the remnants of the Grenadiers' rifle companies to retreat through the minefields, sustaining further casualties. The Coldstream Guards, in a similar attack, managed to obtain one of the hills but, like the Grenadiers, also suffered heavily and also lost their carriers. Realising the dire situation faced by his troops, Brigadier Gascoigne ordered both battalions to be withdrawn. This was achieved under the cover of darkness with no further loss. In the relatively short battle both battalions suffered severe losses, with the 6th Grenadiers sustaining 279 casualties, including 9 officers and 67 men being killed, 5 officers and 83 men wounded, with a further 5 officers and 104 men taken prisoner. The Coldstream suffered 136 casualties.

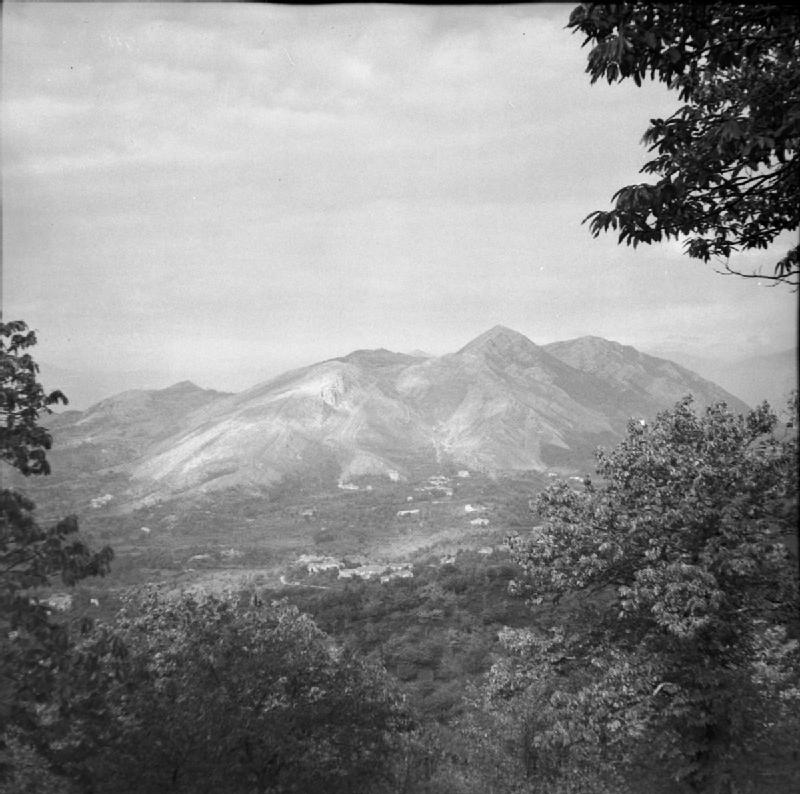
View of Monte Camino during the early stages of the first assault by the British X Corps.

In July 1943 the brigade was attached to the 56th (London) Infantry Division to replace the 168th (London) Infantry Brigade of that division that was temporarily attached to the 50th (Northumbrian) Infantry Division during the Allied invasion of Sicily. With the rest of the 56th Division, the brigade landed at Salerno, the first stage of the Italian Campaign, on 9 September 1943, where they were involved in heavy fighting and sustained heavy losses. During the battle 27-year-old Company Sergeant Major Peter Wright of the 3rd Battalion, Coldstream Guards was awarded the Victoria Cross. The brigade continued to fight in Italy, crossing the Volturno Line in October and in November and December at the Bernhardt Line. In early 1944, due to heavy casualties and a lack of Guards replacements, the brigade was eventually sent back to the United Kingdom, where it became a training brigade for the Brigade of Guards for the rest of the war.

=== Order of battle ===
The brigade was composed as follows during the war:

- 2nd Battalion, Scots Guards (from 28 February 1941, left 1 October 1941, rejoined 14 December 1941 and left 16 June 1942)
- 1st Battalion, Durham Light Infantry (from 28 February 1941, left 23 May 1941)
- 3rd Battalion, Coldstream Guards (from 11 March 1941, left 20 June 1942)
- 22nd Guards Brigade Anti-Tank Company (formed 1 June 1941, disbanded 28 July 1941)
- 1st Battalion, Buffs (Royal East Kent Regiment) (from 7 June 1941, left 21 September 1941)
- 9th Battalion, Rifle Brigade (Tower Hamlets Rifles) (from 29 September 1941, left 14 December 1941, rejoined 14 January and left 4 June 1942)

Upon reforming in August 1942 the 201st Guards Motor Brigade was composed as follows:

- 3rd Battalion, Coldstream Guards (from 25 August 1942, left 23 June 1943, rejoined 22 July 1943 and left 12 March 1944, rejoined again 1 April 1945, left 3 August 1945)
- 2nd Battalion, Scots Guards (from 25 August 1942, left 27 June 1943)
- 9th Battalion, Rifle Brigade (Tower Hamlets Rifles) (from 1 to 5 September 1942, then disbanded)
- 6th Battalion, Grenadier Guards (from 7 October 1942, disbanded 17 November 1944)
- 1st Battalion, Irish Guards (from 13 March 1944)
- 1st Battalion, Welsh Guards (from 11 April 1945, left 3 August 1945)

=== Commanders ===
- Lieutenant-Colonel E.G. Earle (3–21 October 1939)
- Brigadier J.T. Leslie (21 October 1939 – 26 July 1940)
- Brigadier G. Dawes (26 July – 26 August 1940)
- Brigadier A.R. Selby (26 August – 1 September 1940)
- Brigadier I.D. Erskine (11 February – 5 October 1941)
- Brigadier J.C.O. Marriott (20 October 1941 – 17 June 1942)
- Brigadier G.F. Johnson (17–20 June 1942)
- Brigadier J.A. Gascoigne (14 August 1942 – 13 November 1943)
- Brigadier R.B.R. Colvin (27 November 1942 – 5 January 1945)
- Brigadier H.R. Norman (5 January – 31 August 1945)

== Bibliography ==
- Joslen, H. F. (2003) [1960]. Orders of Battle: Second World War, 1939–1945. Uckfield, East Sussex: Naval and Military Press. ISBN 978-1-84342-474-1.
