= Giles Vandeleur =

British army officer (1911–1978)

Lieutenant-Colonel Giles Alexander Meysey Vandeleur, DSO (2 September 1911 – 9 March 1978) was a British Army officer during the Second World War.

He was the only son of Alexander Moore Vandeleur of Cahercon, Kildysart, Co. Clare, Ireland and the Hon. Violet Meysey-Thompson. His father belonged to the prominent landowning family from Kilrush, County Clare. His mother was a daughter of Henry Meysey-Thompson, 1st Baron Knaresborough. His father was killed in action in the early months of World War I; his mother remarried Sir Algar Howard.

He was commissioned into the Irish Guards as a 2nd Lieutenant in 1931. As acting Commanding Officer of the 2nd Armoured Battalion Irish Guards, he served under his cousin Brigadier Joe Vandeleur (their grandfathers were brothers) in the breakout of XXX Corps during Operation Market-Garden. He went on to become acting commander of the British 5th Guards Armoured Brigade in 1945. He retired from the Army in 1949.

In the 1977 film A Bridge Too Far, based on Operation Market-Garden, Michael Byrne played Giles Vandeleur and Michael Caine played Joe.

He was married four times: firstly to Jean Salmond, and secondly to Pamela Wood: both marriages ended in divorce. He married thirdly Margarita de Lopez, who died in 1970, and fourthly Esmée Hutcheson, who died in 1973.

Vandeleur died on 9 March 1978.
