= Ian Erskine =

British Army general (1898–1973)

Major-General Ian Erskine CB CBE DSO
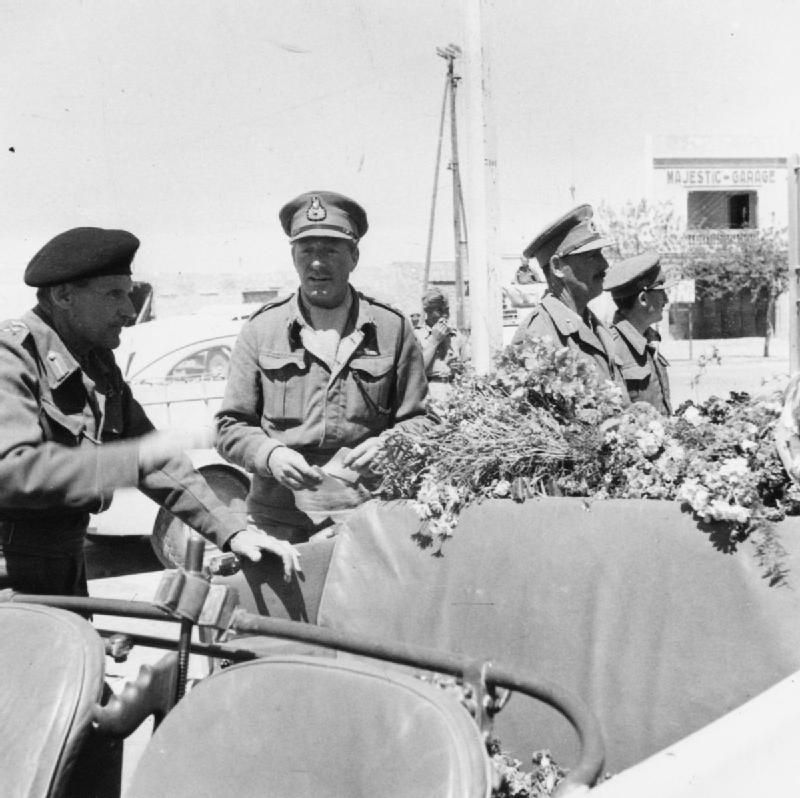
- Erskine (centre) with Bernard Montgomery (left) in Sfax
- Born: 17 March 1898; London, England
- Died: 27 July 1973 (aged 75); Sandwich, Kent, England
- Military career
- Allegiance: United Kingdom
- Branch: British Army
- Service years: 1917–1949
- Rank: Major-General
- Service number: 15319
- Unit: Scots Guards
- Commands: 22nd Guards Brigade (1941); 2nd Battalion, Scots Guards (1940); Tactical School Middle East (1940)
- Conflicts: First World War; Arab revolt in Palestine; Second World War
- Awards: Companion of the Order of the Bath; Commander of the Order of the British Empire; Distinguished Service Order; Mentioned in Despatches (2)

Major-General Ian David Erskine, CB, CBE, DSO (17 March 1898 – 27 July 1973) was a senior British Army officer.

== Early life ==
Erskine was born in London, the son of Alan David Erskine and Enid Rate. He was the grandson of Sir Henry David Erskine and the great-grandson of Francis Seymour, 5th Marquess of Hertford. Erskine was educated at Sandroyd School and Winchester College then the Royal Military College, Sandhurst.

== Military career ==
Erskine commissioned into the Scots Guards on 1 May 1917 and in August was deployed to the Western Front. Erskine was injured in October that year but returned to the front in October 1918. He served as adjutant at the Guards Depot between 1921 and 1923, before serving as regimental adjutant of the Scots Guards until July 1932. In September 1933 Erskine was promoted to major and between 1933 and 1935 undertook training at the Staff College, Camberley.

Between 1935 and 1939, Erskine was Brigade Major, 1st Guards Brigade, and served with the brigade in the Arab revolt in Palestine. Between 1939 and June 1940, Erskine was an instructor and then commandant of the Tactical School Middle East, before becoming commanding officer, 2nd Battalion Scots Guards. Between February and October 1941 he was commander of the 22nd Guards Brigade in Egypt, during which time he was Mentioned in Despatches and awarded the Distinguished Service Order. In 1942 he was Major-General Commanding Troops & Commandant Sudan Defence Force, and he was promoted to acting major general in April that year. From 1943 to 1945 Erskine was Brigade Commander, 148 Pre-OCTU Training Establishments.

From 1945 and 1948, Erskine was Provost Marshal of the Army at the War Office. He retired with the rank of major general in May 1949. He was invested as a Commander of the Order of the British Empire in 1947 and as a Companion of the Order of the Bath in 1949.

== Personal life ==
Erskine married Mariora Beatrice Evelyn Rochfort Alers-Hankey, daughter of Colonel Cecil George Herbert Alers-Hankey and Getrude Clare Fetherstonhaugh, on 1 March 1945.
