= Guards Armoured Division =

British Army military unit (1941–1945)

- Insignia of the Guards Armoured Division.
- Active: 17 June 1941 – 12 June 1945
- Country: United Kingdom
- Branch: British Army
- Type: Armoured
- Size: Division, 14,964 men 343 tanks (Note: 223 cruisers, 25 anti-aircraft tanks, 24 close support tanks, 63 light tanks, and 8 Observation tanks.) (Note: These two figures are the war establishment, the on-paper strength, of the division for 1944/1945; for information on how the division size changed over the war please see British Army during the Second World War and British Armoured formations of Second World War.)
- Engagements: World War II; Operation Overlord; Operation Market Garden; Battle of the Bulge; Operation Veritable; Western Allied invasion of Germany
- Battle honours: 18–23 July 1944 Bourguébus Ridge; 30 July 9–August 1944 Mont Pinçon; 17–27 September 1944 The Nederrijn; 6 February – 10 March 1945 The Rhineland

Commanders
- Notable commanders: Sir Oliver Leese; Sir Alan Adair

The Guards Armoured Division was an armoured division of the British Army during the Second World War. The division was created in the United Kingdom on 17 June 1941 during the Second World War from elements of the Guards units, the Grenadier Guards, Coldstream Guards, Scots Guards, Irish Guards, Welsh Guards, and the Household Cavalry.

The division remained in the United Kingdom, training, until 13 June 1944, when it landed several armoured command vehicles at Arromanche. It lagered its advanced tactical headquarters in communication with GHQ awaiting the bulk of the armour Normandy, France, during Operation Overlord as part of VIII Corps. Its first major engagement was Operation Goodwood, the attack by three armoured divisions towards Bourguebus Ridge in an attempt to break out of the Normandy beachhead. That was followed by Operation Bluecoat, the advance east of Caen as the Falaise pocket formed. Transferred to XXX Corps, the division liberated Brussels. It led the XXX Corps attack in Operation Market Garden, the ground forces' advance to relieve airborne troops aiming to seize the bridges up to Arnhem, capturing Nijmegen bridge in conjunction with American paratroopers of the 82nd Airborne Division. The Tac HQ reached Arnhem but was not able to seize the bridge because German anti tank guns were entrenched on the North side and the British airborne had surrendered or were too far away to help. During the Ardennes offensive, it was sent in bitterly cold weather, which forced the tanks to start their engines every hour to prevent the fuel and oil freezing, to the Meuse as a reserve in case the Germans broke through the American lines; some German tanks breaking through were stopped. It endured hard fighting in Operation Veritable, the advance towards the Rhine through the Reichswald, and again in the advance through Germany. The division existed until 12 June 1945, a little over a month after Victory in Europe Day, when it was reorganised as an infantry division, the Guards Division, after almost exactly four years as an armoured division.

== History ==
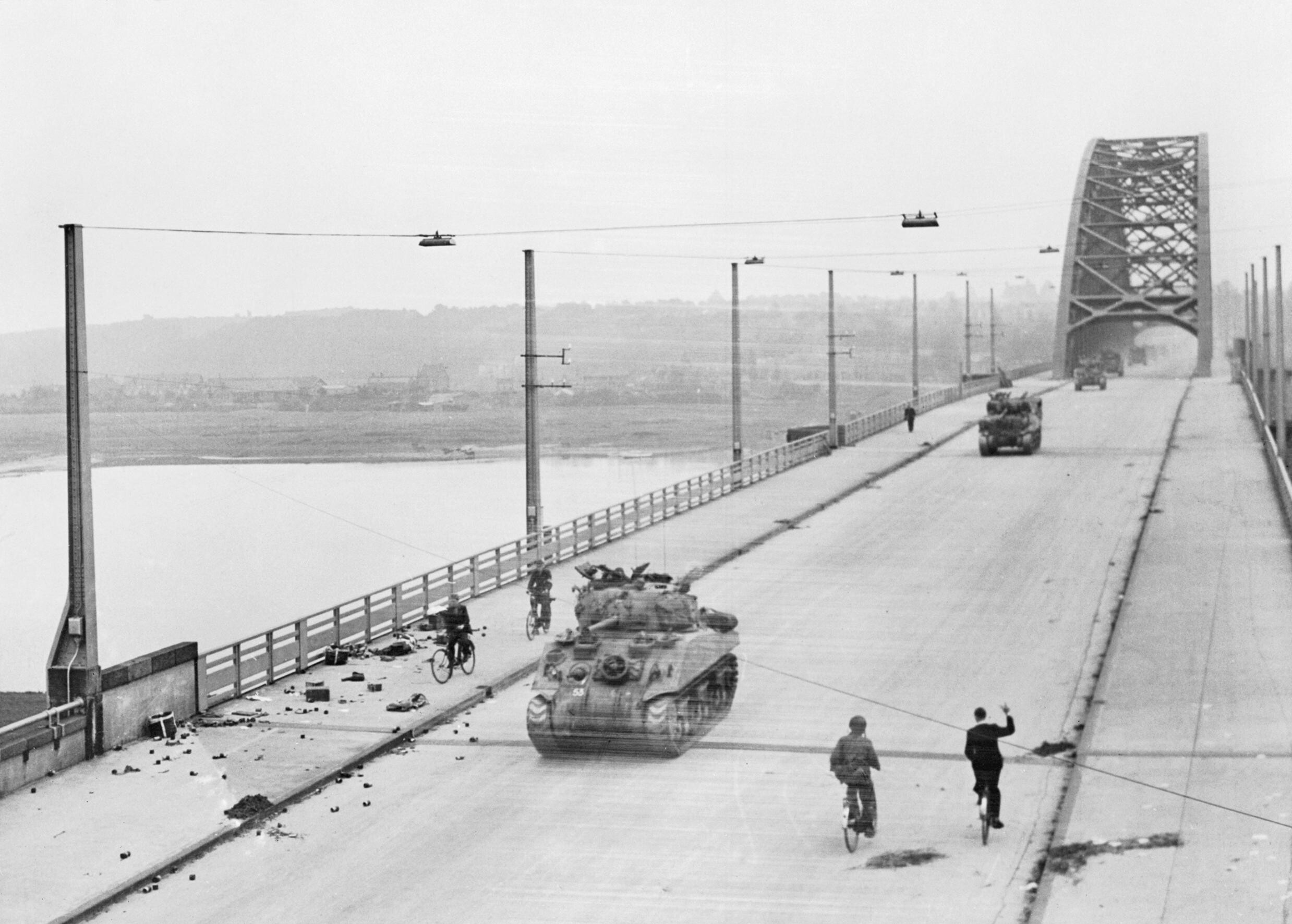
Sherman tanks of the Guards Armoured Division cross the road bridge at Nijmegen during its capture in Operation Market Garden, September 1944.

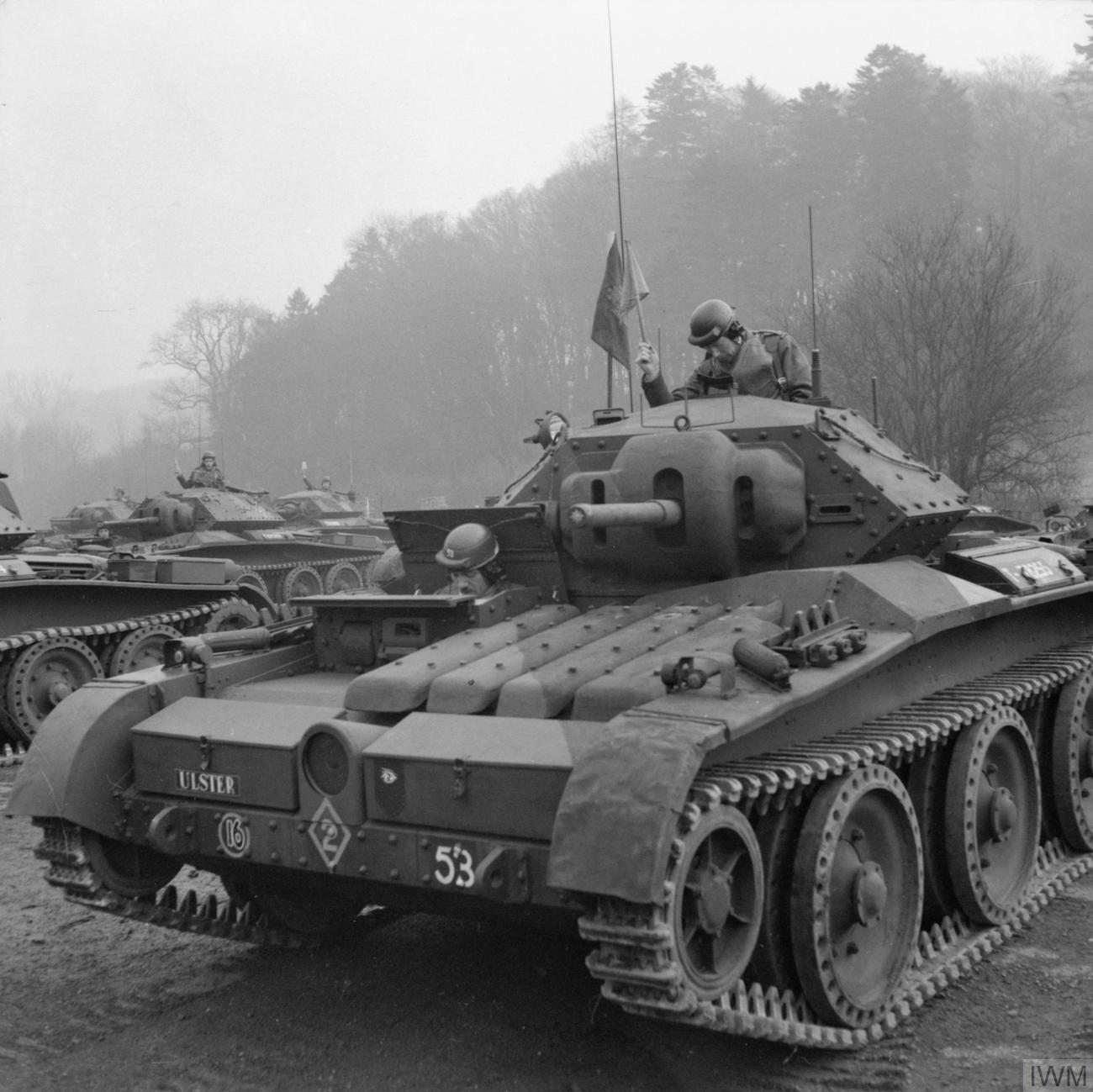
Covenanter tanks of the Irish Guards, part of the 5th Guards Armoured Brigade, in Southern England, March 1942.

Brainchild of General Sir Alan Brooke, then the Commander-in-Chief, Home Forces, the Guards Armoured Division, commanded by Major General Oliver Leese, was formed in May 1941 as a result of the shortage of armoured troops in England to face a German invasion. There was opposition to this move, as it was felt by the establishment that the height of the Guards—selected for height, amongst other criteria, as elite soldiers—would make them poor tank crew. The division originally consisted of two armoured brigades, the 5th and the 6th. These consisted of three tank regiments of Covenanter V tanks and a motor infantry battalion. A certain level of common sense was applied to these changes, with the 1st Battalion Grenadier Guards being assigned as the motor battalion, due to the presence of King's Company. This group of men were all at least 6 feet tall and were expected to struggle to fit into tanks. Uniquely the Guards Armoured Division also kept its infantry company structure, with the tanks organised into companies and battalions, rather than squadrons and regiments.

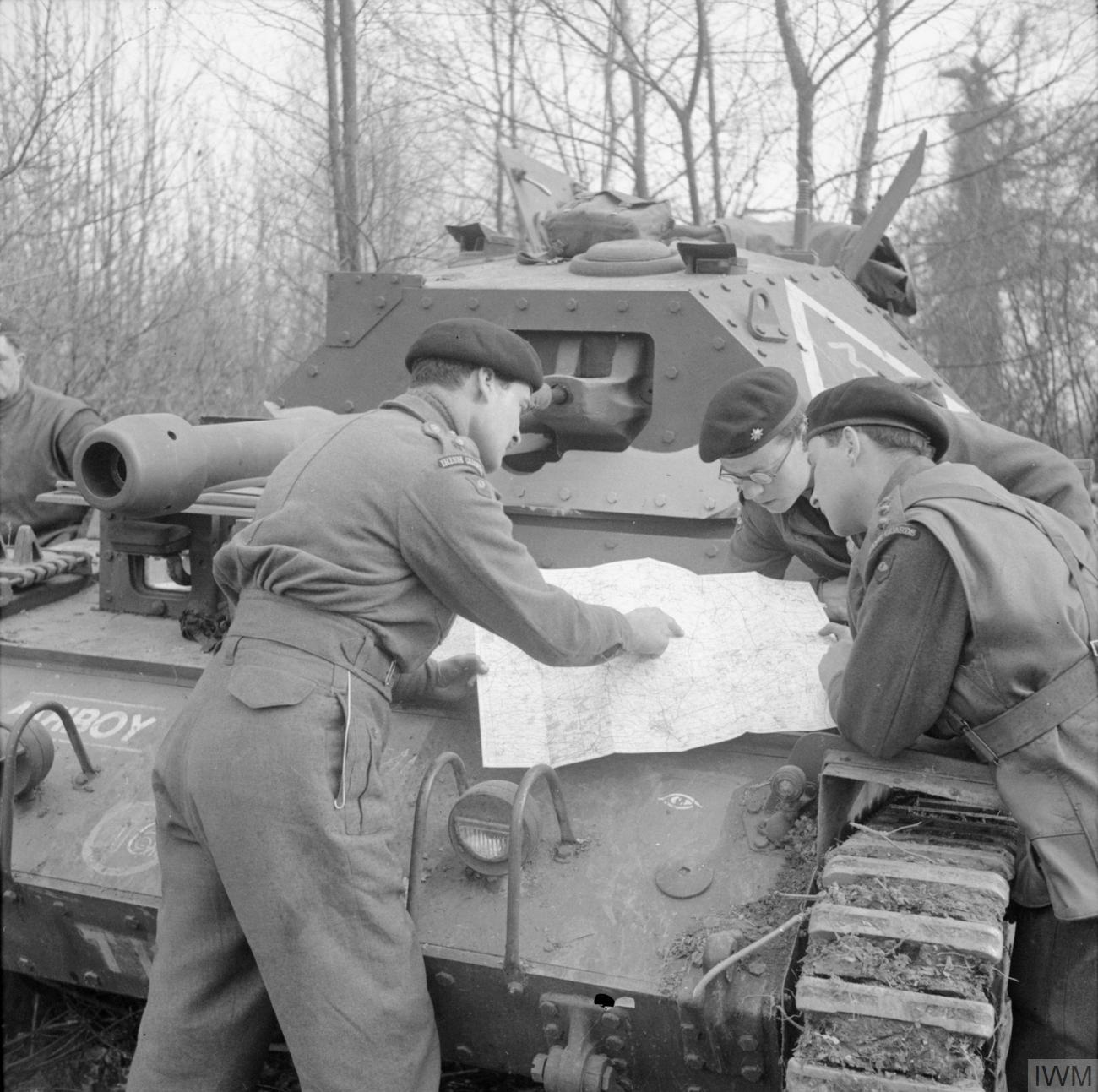
Officers of the Guards Armoured Division consult a map laid out on the front of a Crusader III during Exercise 'Spartan', 6 March 1943.

At the end of 1942, the division, now under the command of Major General Allan Adair, was split in line with all armoured divisions at this time, with one armoured brigade replaced with a brigade of lorried infantry. At this point the 6th and 5th Guards Armoured Brigades were separated. During this period the division re-equipped with Crusader III tanks, which were again replaced with Sherman Vs by 1944.

=== Normandy ===
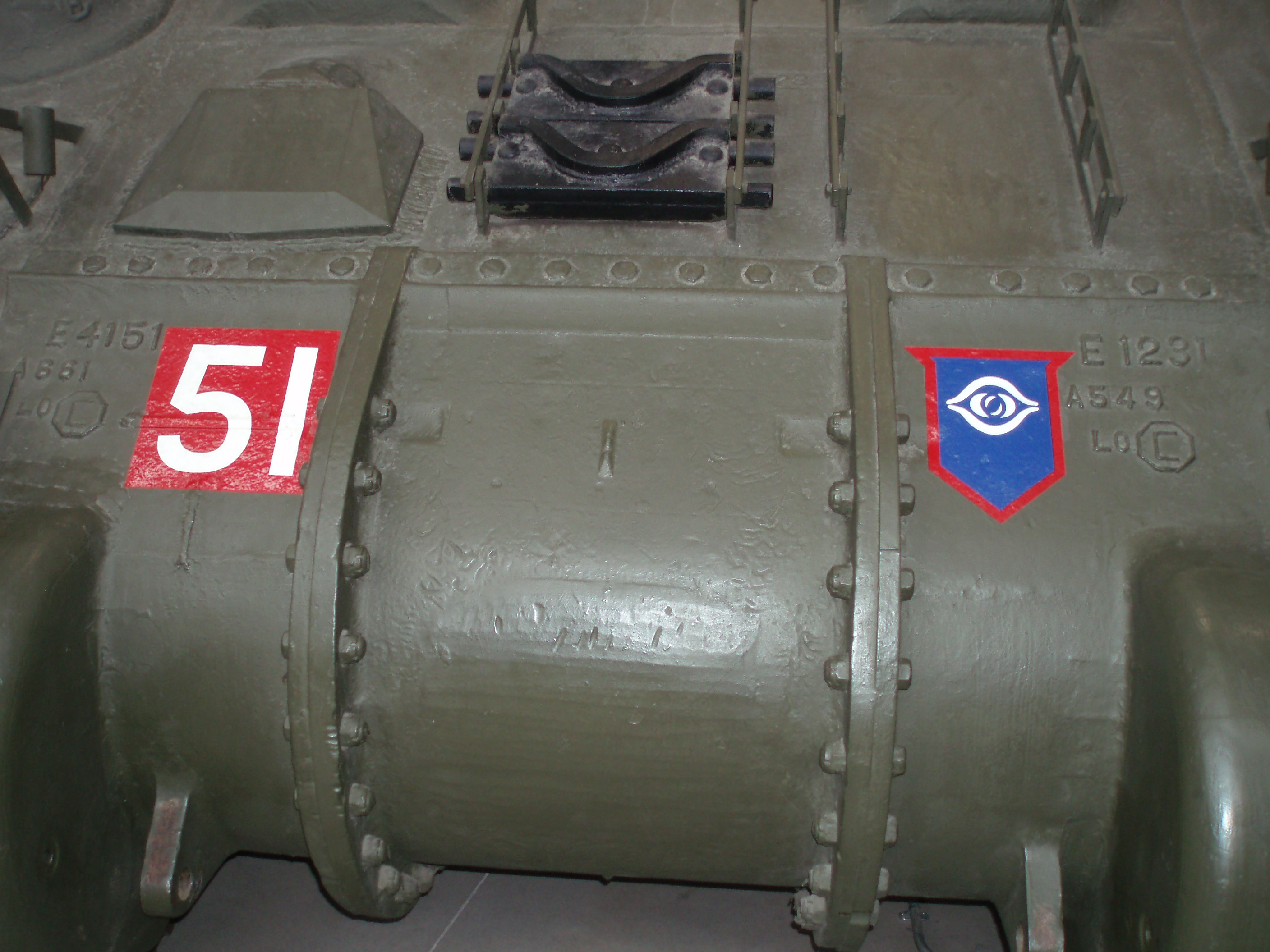
The Guards Armoured Division vehicle insignia, on a Sherman Firefly preserved at the Bovington Tank Museum.

The Guards Armoured Division landed in Normandy at the end of June, and went into battle around Carpiquet Airfield soon after, with the infantry of the 32nd Guards Brigade skirmishing with the 12th SS Hitlerjugend. However this was only to last a couple of weeks before the armour arrived and the division was deployed further south to participate in Operation Goodwood.

The aim of this attack has been debated many times, but whether an attempt at a breakout or a more limited effort, it had the effect of drawing most of the German reserves towards Caen, aiding the Cobra offensive. Originally intended as a combined attack, it was changed to an armoured assault as the British Army in France had suffered heavy infantry casualties and were struggling to find replacements. As a result, the attack was changed to one largely of armoured divisions, as lost tanks would be easier to replace.

The Guards Armoured Division joined with the 7th and 11th Armoured Divisions for this attack. The aim was to strike south out of the Orne bridgehead on 18 July. The Guards Armoured Division was to advance south-east to capture Vimont and Argences. Prior to this attack the German defences were heavily bombed by the Royal Air Force. Unfortunately this was less effective than hoped against the dug-in defenders, both in the south of Caen and in Cagny and Emieville. All three of these areas were in the path of the Guards advance. The attack quickly bogged down and losses became heavy, the guards losing 60 tanks to a single battery of four Luftwaffe 88mm AA guns. In addition to this, a group of Tiger I tanks of the 503, which had been completely knocked out in the bombardment, recovered enough over the course of the morning to stiffen the resistance against the Guards. In addition, the Guards were checked by a Schwere Panzerabteilung and a counterattack by the 12 SS Hilterjugend. Novel tactics had to be employed to deal with the more heavily gunned and armoured Tiger, with one being rammed by a Sherman of the Irish Guards.

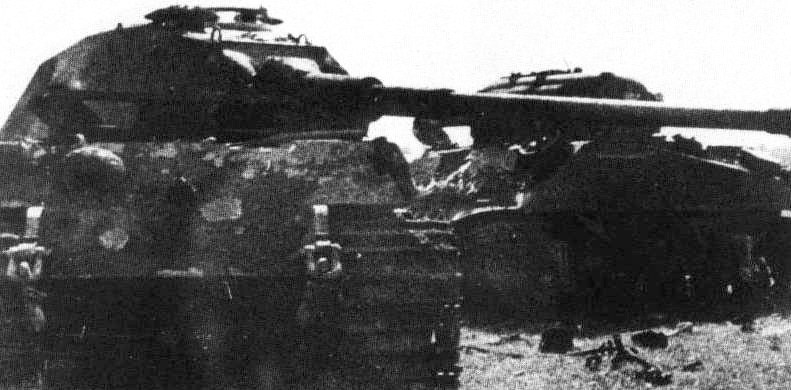
A Tiger II tank of the 503rd Heavy Tank Battalion, and the Sherman tank that knocked it out by ramming, July 1944.

Whilst taking part in Operation Goodwood east of Cagny, Lt John Gorman who was a Troop Commander in the 2nd (Armoured) Battalion Irish Guards was probing forward in his Sherman tank Ballyragget when suddenly he found himself broadside to a German Tiger II, the German heavy tank that no-one had yet seen. He fired his 75mm gun but the shot bounced off German tank. He was unable to fire again as the Sherman's gun was jammed. By now, the Tiger Tank was traversing its gun towards Gorman's Sherman so he ordered his driver L/Cpl James Brown to ram the German Tank. The collision disabled the Tiger and caused its crew to bail out. After seeing his own crew to safety, Lt Gorman commandeered a Firefly, Ballymena, whose commander had been killed and continued to fire at the Tiger tank with the Firefly's 17-pounder gun until the Tiger's destruction was complete. For this action Gorman was awarded the Military Cross and his driver, L/Cpl James Brown, was awarded the Military Medal, being the first members of the Allied Expeditionary Forces to knock out a Tiger II. However, the German account is rather different. The Tiger II gunner, Hans-Joachim Thaysen, insisted he never even saw Gorman's Sherman and was instead concentrating on firing ahead of him. Thaysen also said that it was a German anti-tank gun friendly fire incident which was likely trying to fire at Gorman's Sherman that destroyed his Tiger II, which caused the crew to bail out. The 75mm PaK hit the Tiger II on the left side between the track and running gear. Thaysen said the round penetrated and just missed him under his backside.

The next day enough progress was made to allow the Guards to reach Bourgebus Ridge and support the 7th and 11th Armoured Divisions, German reinforcements started to arrive and the attack ground to a halt. Fighting continued until 20 July, when the gains were consolidated by infantry and the attack died off. The battle, while not a success from the operational point of view, was a battle in which the Guards acquitted themselves satisfactorily. The operation also drew off most of the German mechanised reserves, being convinced that the allies planned to break out from Caen. This left little for reinforcements, when the Americans began Operation Cobra on 25 July.

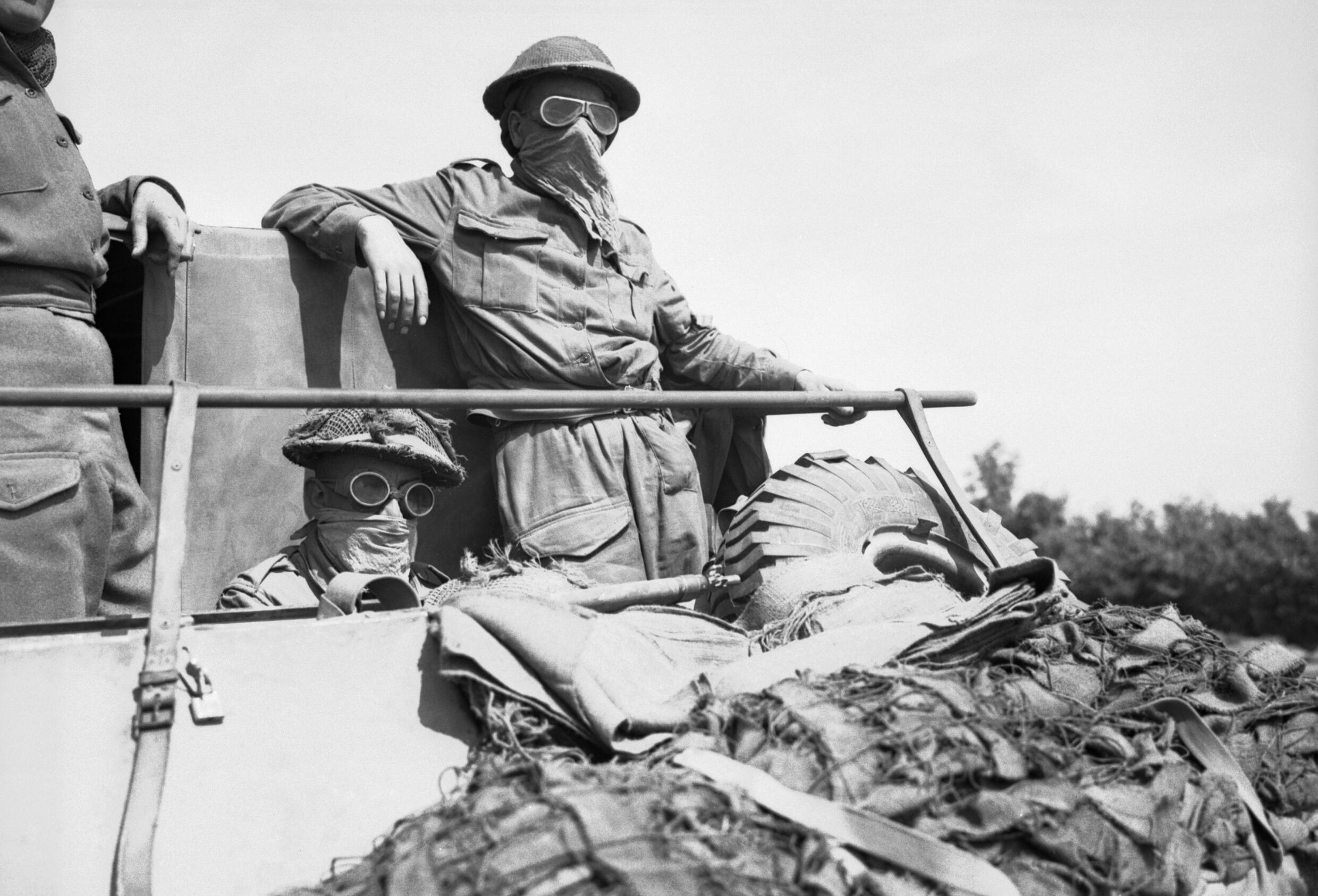
Guardsmen of the 3rd Battalion, Irish Guards in a Loyd carrier, wrapped up against the clouds of dust, during Operation 'Goodwood', 18 July 1944.

After Goodwood the Guards Armoured Division was reorganized into unofficial battlegroups. Goodwood had shown the undesirable effects of not having supporting infantry with the tanks. Consequently, the two Grenadier battalions were formed into a battlegroup, with the Coldstream infantry attached to the Irish Guards Tanks and the Coldstream Guards tanks split into two groups and used to support the Irish and Welsh Guards battalions. The units were not organized in any formal way at this point, but rather by who happened to be closest at the time. This organisation was not unique to the Guards, the 11th Armoured also adapted the formation for Bluecoat, apparently on Lieutenant-General Richard O'Connor's orders. After this reorganisation, the Guards Armoured Division took part in Operation Bluecoat.

Operation Bluecoat was launched on 30 July in support of the Americans taking part in Operation Cobra. Rather than continue to try to push past Caen where the majority of the German armour had redeployed after Goodwood, this attack switched back towards Villers-Bocage to support the Americans and to capture the road junction at Vire and the high ground at Mont Pincon. While the opposition was initially two weak infantry divisions (276th and 326th), they were well dug in, having prepared minefields and other defences. The terrain was bocage, which also slowed down the speed of the attack. Initially the Guards supported the 11th Armoured Division who were the spearhead of the attack by protecting their flank, however they took over the spearhead duties themselves on 1 August, fighting in the bocage until 15 August against elements of the 276th and 326th Infantry, 21st Panzer and 1st, 9th and 10th SS-Panzer Divisions. This was to prove challenging to the Guards who were not used to short-range combat. The Germans ended up committing their tanks piecemeal, and as a result there was no defensive line as such. Instead common opposition would consist of a small mobile group of infantry supported by a few tanks or self-propelled guns. Snipers and mortars were a particular problem in this terrain, with field modifications added to the tank to try to reduce the damage. Due to the difficulty of completely clearing the enemy from a particular area and of supplying sub-units, the attack ground to a halt on 4 August.

On 7 August the Guards had a short break as the Germans concentrated their forces on a counter-offensive against the Americans at Mortain. On that day the Guards were given the 11th Armoured Divisions area to defend as well, freeing up the 11th Armoured. While not actually trying to launch a major advance, attacks in the local area were fierce, particularly around Chenedolle. Support from other arms was also provided, with the Welsh infantry regiment supported by Churchill tanks of the 6th Guards Tank Brigade and the Household Cavalry deploying as infantry in the line for a brief period.

On the 15th the Germans started to withdraw but were caught in the Falaise pocket, allowing the Guards to recover for a refit. Bluecoat had been a success and the combined arms of the battlegroup concept had been proven. This would be the way the Guards Armoured Division would operate from now on. The division suffered many losses in the operation, though the Allies had enough replacements that they could lose six tanks for every German tank destroyed. Crew were a different matter and a consequence of the operation was the removal of the Crusader AA tanks, possible due to the lack of air opposition; their crews were used to man the replacement Shermans provided to the division.

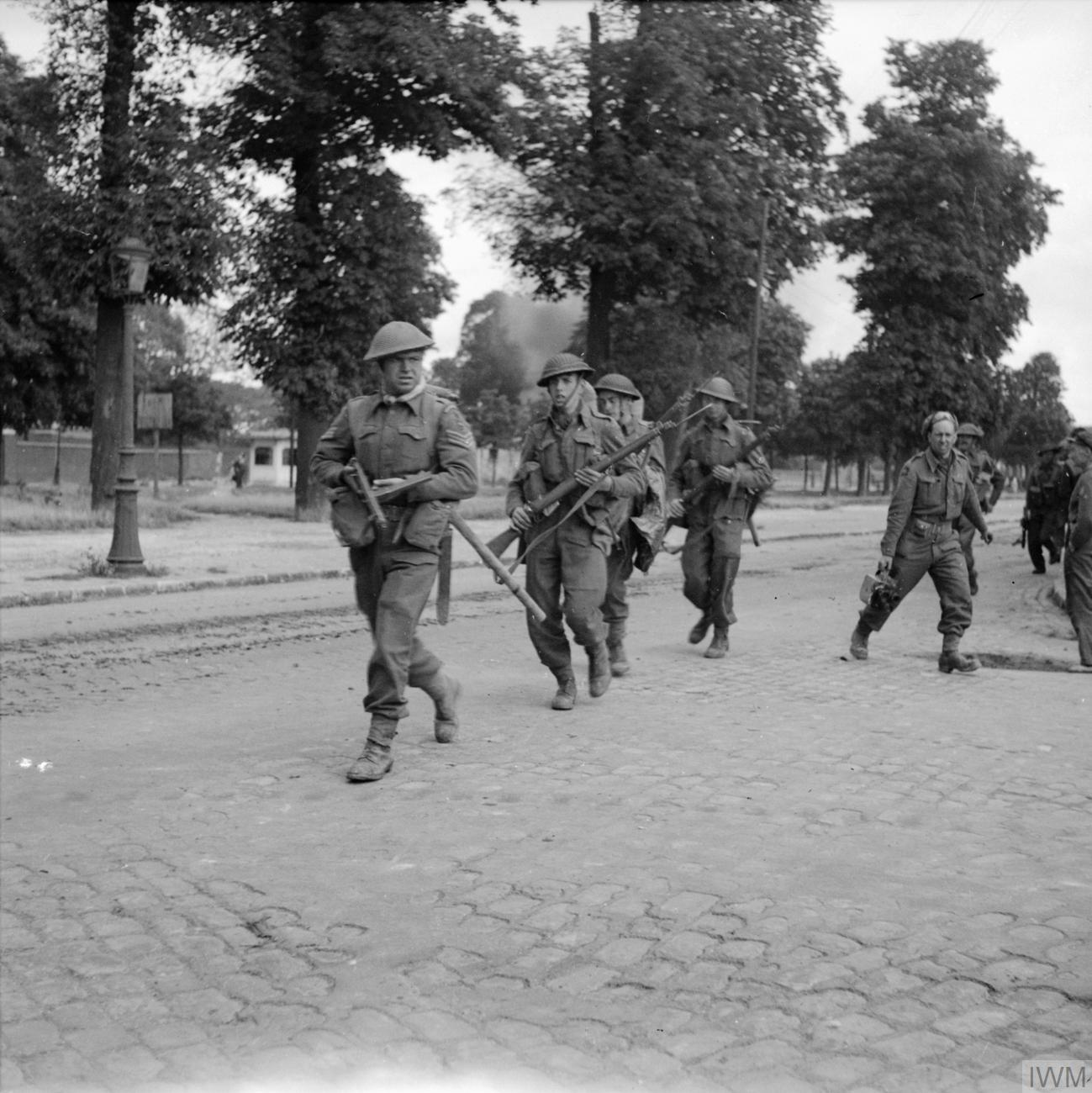
Men of the 5th Battalion, Coldstream Guards enter Arras, France, 1 September 1944.

The Guards were not committed to the fighting in the Falaise pocket, but instead got a chance to rest and regroup. On the 27th they were transferred to XXX Corps under Lieutenant-General Brian Horrocks and advanced on the River Seine. Due to the near total collapse of the German Army in France they reached and crossed the river on the 29th. Here some more changes were made to the Guards organization. The use of an Armoured Reconnaissance Regiment had not proved successful, while armoured cars had proved more adept at the role, despite the disadvantage of being more tied to the road network. Consequently, the 2nd Household Cavalry were formally attached as the official division reconnaissance element. This freed up the Welsh Guards tank crews for other duties, and formal battlegroups were formed. These were far more organized than the previous ad hoc affair, with each regiment's battalions being merged to form a battlegroup. The Grenadier battlegroup consisted of the tanks of the 2nd Battalion and the motor infantry of the 1st Battalion, Grenadier Guards. This required some rearranging of the division: although occasionally altered, the Grenadier and Irish groups formed the 5th Brigade, and the Coldstream and Welsh groups made the 32nd Brigade. Machine-gun support was provided by the Grenadier Guards for the 5th Brigade and the Royal Northumberland Fusiliers in the 32nd.

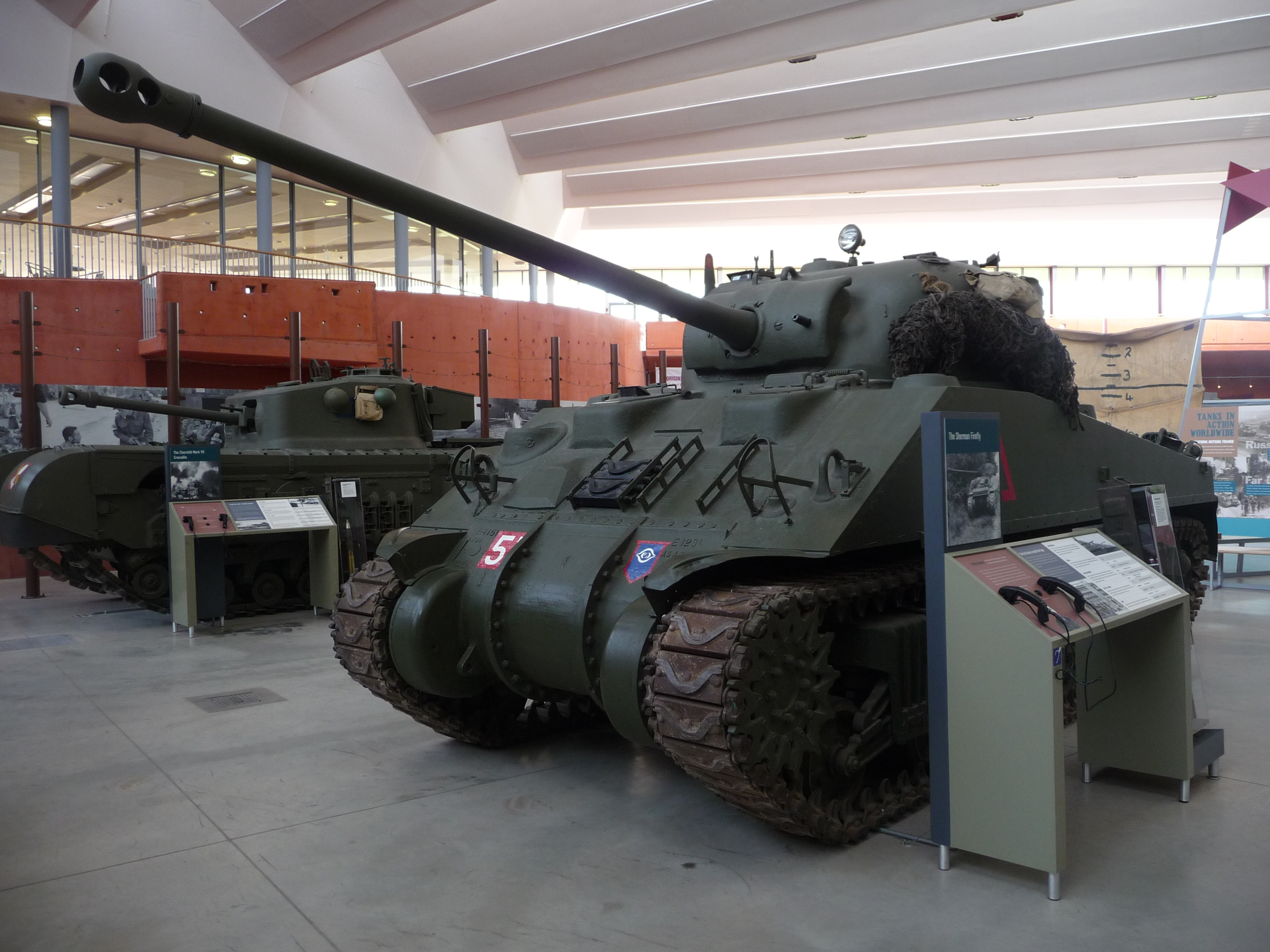
Sherman Firefly in the Bovington Tank Museum, painted to represent Sergeant Robinson's tank of the 2nd (Armoured) Battalion, Grenadier Guards, the first British tank to cross the Waal at Nijmegen during the Arnhem Operation in 1944.

Having broken out from Normandy, the terrain change and the countryside became much more open and flowing. The advance was now generally along a road, with the lead elements and Typhoon air support brushing aside most opposition before it could delay the column. The population was grateful for their liberation; the 2nd Household Cavalry, who were generally first into the town, had to keep a sharp eye on stowage and aerials on the exterior of the vehicle lest it be taken as a souvenir. In one town, only the intervention of the police prevented a scout car having its wheels removed. The population were starving, having been deprived of food by the Germans, and supplies and chocolate were dished out to the grateful population. On 3 September Brussels was liberated by the Guards Armoured Division after a high-speed run, the division advancing 75 miles in one day. The division could not rest long however, pushing further into north-east Belgium against stiffening German opposition. After gaining support from the 11th Armoured Division, the Guards reached the border with the Netherlands, the Irish Guards under Joe Vandeleur seizing "Joe's Bridge", a bridge over the Meuse-Escault canal in a surprise assault.

=== The Netherlands and Germany ===
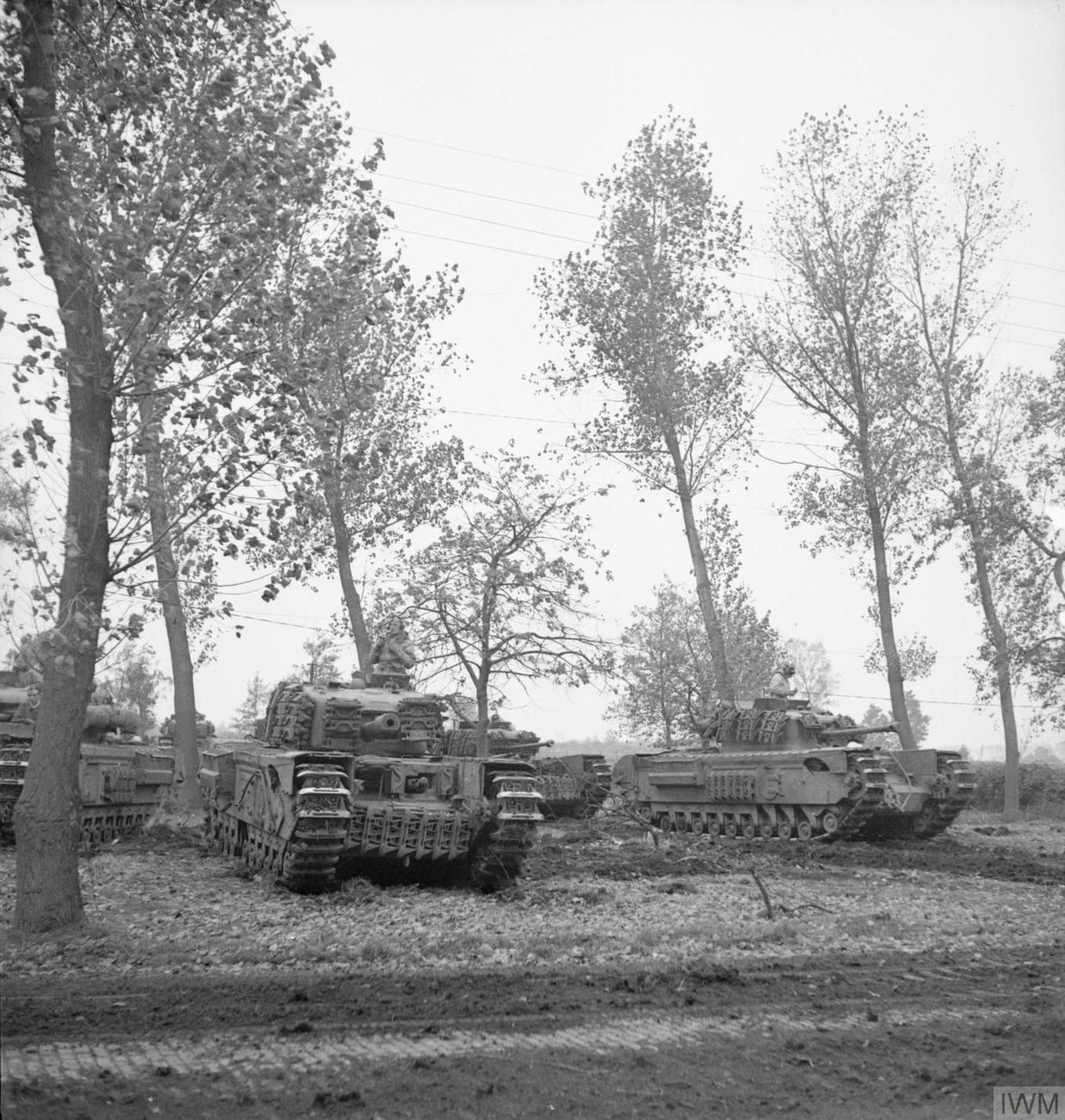
Churchill tanks of the 4th Battalion, Grenadier Guards assemble for the advance on Liesel, Netherlands 1 November 1944.

The Guards Armoured Division was then withdrawn from the line to prepare for Operation Market Garden. They formed the spearhead of the attacks into the Netherlands, with the Grenadier Guards managing to seize the Nijmegen Bridge with the help of the US 82nd Airborne Division. Following this they spent the winter in the Netherlands and Germany, before being moved into Belgium as a reserve against the Battle of the Bulge. The infantry of the Welsh Guards were also replaced by the 2nd Battalion Scots Guards, due to a severe lack of replacements in the British Army at the time. Following this the division participated in Operation Veritable, the operation to clear the Reichswald forest. Due to the weather and the Germans flooding the area, only the infantry ended up playing an active part. After this the towed batteries of the Royal Artillery anti-tank guns were converted to infantry for the lack of targets. The division then supported the push over the Rhine before breaking into Germany and fighting up towards the Netherlands and along the German coast. Two Victoria Crosses were awarded to the division for the fighting during this period; neither recipient survived the war. They were Guardsman Edward Charlton of the 2nd Battalion, Irish Guards and Captain Ian Liddell of the 5th Battalion, Coldstream Guards.

After the German surrender the Guards were mostly involved in mopping up operations and occupation duties. A small detachment was used to test the new Centurion universal tank, six of which had arrived in Germany, too late to be used in the conflict. Eventually the division was selected for conversion back to infantry, and held a "farewell to armour" parade on 9 June 1945; Field Marshal Sir Bernard Montgomery took the final salute.

== Composition ==
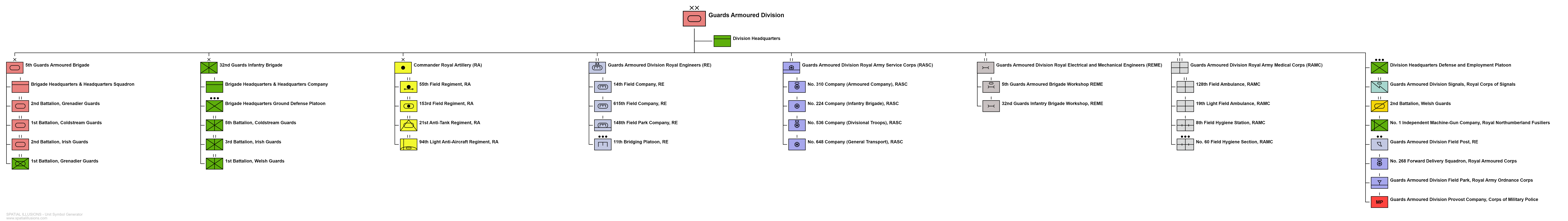
Guards Armoured Division D-Day.

Although its paper organisation remained one armoured brigade and one mechanised infantry brigade, after Normandy the division generally fought as four combined-arms battle-groups, two under each brigade headquarters. The organisation of the division at different times included:

- Divisional Headquarters (Battalion)
- Guards Armoured Division Signals, Royal Corps of Signals (Battalion), 18/6/41–11/6/45
- 2nd Household Cavalry Regiment (Armoured Reconnaissance), 15/9/41–27/2/43
- 2nd Battalion, Welsh Guards (Armoured Reconnaissance), 13/4/43–11/6/45
- 1st Independent Machine-Gun Company, 24/3/44–11/6/45
- Guards Armoured Division Postal Unit, Royal Engineers 01/01/1944-31/12/45
- 256 Forward Delivery Company, Royal Armoured Corps (Tank Supply & Transport)
- Guards Armoured Division Field Park, Royal Army Ordnance Corps (Company)
- Guards Armoured Division Royal Electrical and Mechanical Engineers (Battalion) – (minus the LADs to each unit, the divisional REME included:)
  - Commander REME
  - Armoured Brigade Workshop
  - Infantry Brigade Workshop
- Guards Armoured Division Royal Army Medical Corps
  - 128 Infantry Brigade Field Ambulance (Battalion)
  - 19 Armoured Brigade Light Field Ambulance (Company)
  - 8 Field Dressing Station (Company)
  - 60 Field Hygiene Section
- Guards Armoured Divisional Provost Company, Corps of Military Police

=== 5th Guards Armoured Brigade ===
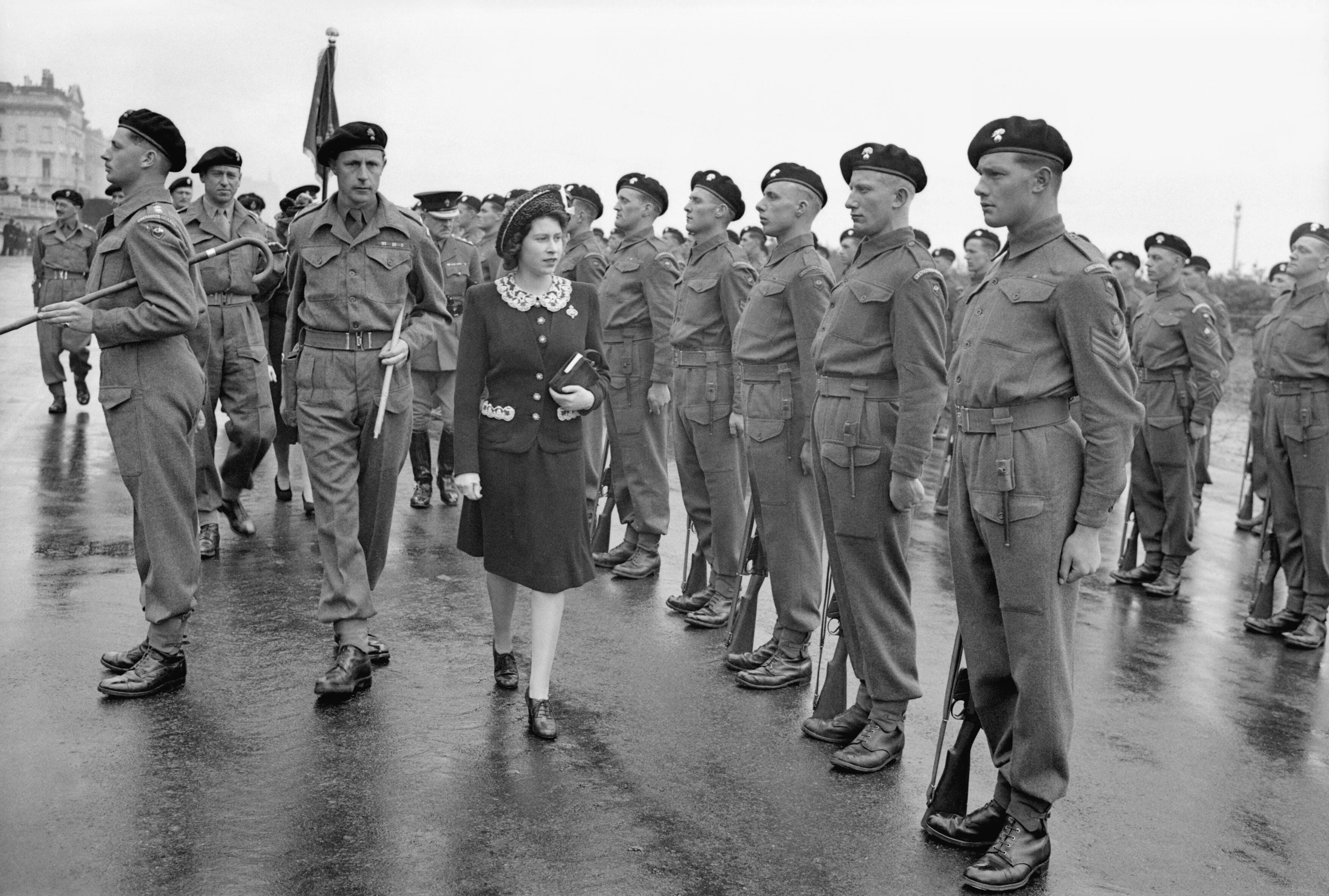
Princess Elizabeth inspecting an honour guard during a Royal visit to 5th Guards Armoured Brigade, at Hove, 17 May 1944

- 5th Guards Armoured Brigade (15/9/41–11/6/45)
  - 5th Guards Armoured Brigade Headquarters (Company)
  - 2nd Armoured Battalion, Grenadier Guards
  - 1st Armoured Battalion, Coldstream Guards
  - 2nd Armoured Battalion, Irish Guards
  - 1st Motor Battalion, Grenadier Guards

=== 6th Guards Armoured Brigade ===
- 6th Guards Armoured Brigade (15/9/41–2/1/43)
  - 6th Guards Armoured Brigade Headquarters (Company)
  - 4th Armoured Battalion, Grenadier Guards, 15/9/41–14/1/43 | 2/2/45–16/6/45
  - 4th Armoured Battalion, Coldstream Guards, 2/2/45–16/6/45
  - 3rd Armoured Battalion, Scots Guards, 15/9/41–14/1/43 | 2/2/45–16/6/45
  - 2nd Armoured Battalion, Welsh Guards, 15/9/41–14/1/43
  - 4th Motor Battalion, Coldstream Guards, 15/9/41–14/1/43

=== 32nd Guards Infantry Brigade ===
- 32nd Guards Infantry Brigade (11/7/44–2/10/44 | 7/10/44–13/2/45 | 30/5/42–
  - 32nd Guards Infantry Brigade Headquarters (Company)
    - Ground Defence Platoon
  - 5th Battalion, Grenadier Guards, 1/10/41–4/6/42
  - 5th Battalion, Coldstream Guards, 1/10/41–31/8/45
  - 2nd Battalion, Scots Guards, 20/2/45–31/8/45
  - 4th Battalion, Scots Guards, 1/10/41–5/9/43
  - 3rd Battalion, Irish Guards, 5/9/43–21/2/45 | 29/5/45–31/8/45
  - 1st Battalion, Welsh Guards, 4/6/42–22/3/45
  - 2nd Battalion, Welsh Guards, 20/6/45–31/8/45
  - 32nd Guards Infantry Brigade Support Group (Northumberland Fusiliers), 18/9/43–12/3/44

=== Guards Support Group ===
- Guards Support Group (15/9/41–31/5/42)
  - Guards Support Group Headquarters Battery
  - 1st Battalion, Welsh Guards (Mechanised), 15/9/41–31/5/42
  - 153rd (Leicestershire Yeomanry) Field Regiment, Royal Artillery, 10/10/41–31/5/42
  - 21st Anti-Tank Regiment, Royal Artillery, 10/10/41–31/5/42
  - 94th Light Anti-Aircraft Regiment, Royal Artillery, 10/10/41–31/5/42

=== Commander, Royal Artillery ===
- Commander, Royal Artillery
  - Headquarters Guards Armoured Divisional Artillery (Company)
  - 55th (Wessex) Field Regiment, Royal Artillery, 8/6/42–11/6/45
  - 153rd (Leicestershire Yeomanry) Field Regiment, Royal Artillery, 8/6/42–11/6/45
  - 21st Anti-Tank Regiment, Royal Artillery, 1/6/42–29/5/45
  - 75th Anti-Tank Regiment, Royal Artillery, 1/6/45–11/6/45
  - 94th Light Anti-Aircraft Regiment, Royal Artillery, 1/6/42–11/6/45

=== Commander, Royal Engineers ===
- Commander, Royal Engineers
  - 14 Field Squadron, Royal Engineers, 4/8/41–11/6/45
  - 15 Field Squadron, Royal Engineers, 4/8/41–28/2/43
  - 615 Field Squadron, Royal Engineers, 1/3/43–11/6/45
  - 148 Field Park Squadron, Royal Engineers, 4/8/41–11/6/45
  - 11 Bridging Troop, Royal Engineers, 1/10/43–11/6/45

=== Commander, Royal Army Service Corps ===
- Commander, Royal Army Service Corps
  - CRASC Headquarters (Company)
  - 310 Armoured Brigade Motor Transport Company, Royal Army Service Corps
  - 224 Infantry Brigade Motor Transport Company, Royal Army Service Corps
  - 535 Divisional Troops Motor Transport Company, Royal Army Service Corps
  - 648 General Motor Transport Company, Royal Army Service Corps

== Higher formations served under ==
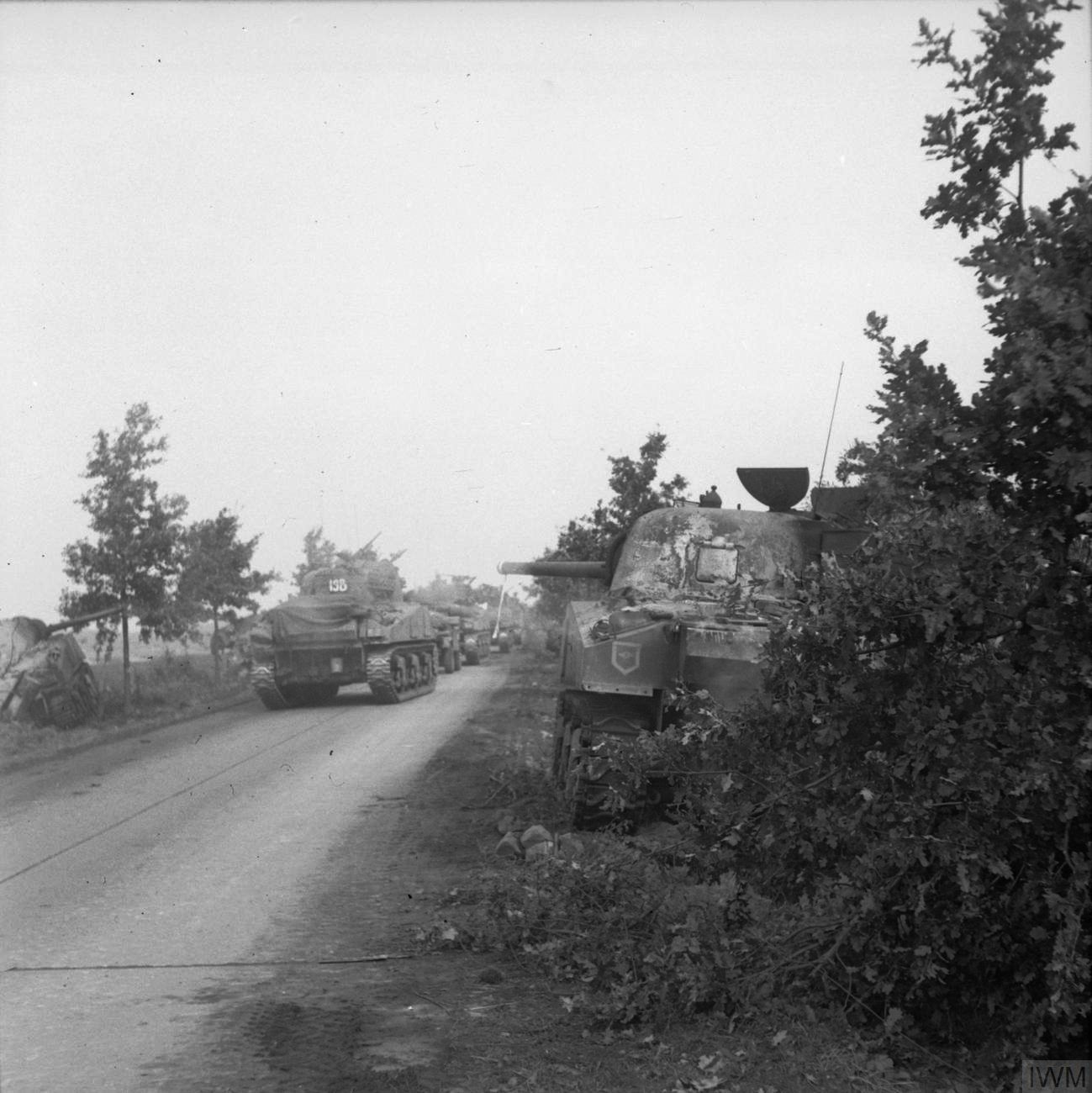
Sherman tanks of the Irish Guards Group advance past others which were knocked out earlier during Operation Market Garden, 17 September 1944

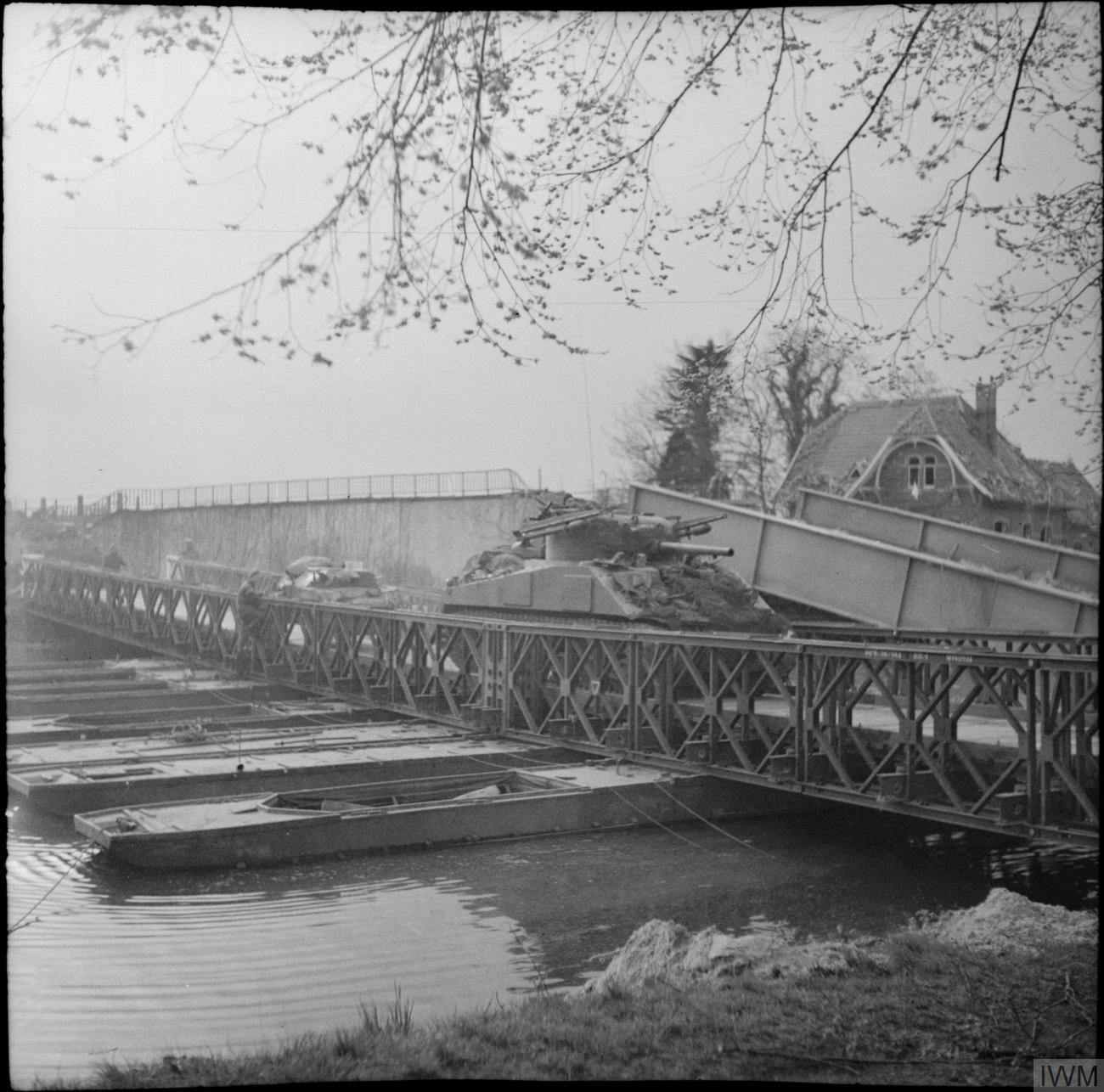
Sherman tank of the 1st Battalion, Coldstream Guards, fitted with 60lb aircraft rockets on the turret sides, crossing a pontoon bridge over the Dortmund-Ems Canal, 6 April 1945.

- War Office Control 17 June – 14 September 1941
- Southern Command 15 September 1941 – 17 March 1943
- VIII Corps 17 March 1943 – 19 June 1944
- XII Corps 19–27 June 1944
- Second Army 27 June – 4 July 1944
- XII Corps 4–13 July 1944
- VIII Corps 13–23 July 1944
- II Canadian Corps 24–30 July 1944
- VIII Corps 30 July – 28 August 1944
- XXX Corps 28 August – 12 December 1944
- XII Corps 13–20 December 1944
- XXX Corps 20 December 1944 – 17 January 1945
- First Canadian Army 18–20 January 1945
- XXX Corps 21 January – 7 March 1945
- II Canadian Corps 8–9 March 1945
- XXX Corps 10 March – 15 April 1945
- XII Corps 16–27 April 1945
- XXX Corps 28 April – 11 June 1945

== General Officer Commanding ==
The Guards Armoured Division only had three General Officer Commanding, during its existence:

Appointed	General Officer Commanding
17 June 1941	Major-General Sir Oliver Leese, 3rd Baronet
12 September 1942	Brig Allan Adair (Note: Adair initially took over as the acting General Officer Commanding on 12 September 1942. On 12 June when the division was reorganised as an infantry division, Adair remained as the General Officer Commanding.)
21 September 1942	Major-General Allan Adair (Note: Adair. On 12 June when the division was reorganised as an infantry division, Adair remained as the General Officer Commanding. It became known as the Guards Division.)
December 1945	Major-General John Marriott

== See also ==
- List of British divisions in World War II
- British Armoured formations of World War II

== Sources ==
- Boscawen, Robert (2001). Armoured Guardsmen: A War Diary, June 1944-April 1945. Barnsley, England: Pen & Sword.
- Cole, Howard (1973). Formation Badges of World War 2. Britain, Commonwealth and Empire. London: Arms and Armour Press.
- Daglish, Ian (2005). Goodwood. Over the Battlefield. Barnsley: Leo Cooper. ISBN 978-1-84415-153-0.
- Daglish, Ian (2010). Operation Bluecoat: Breakout from Normandy. Pen and Sword. ISBN 978-1783034475.
- Fortin, Ludovic (2004). British Tanks in Normandy. Paris: Histoire & Collections. ISBN 978-2-915239-33-1.
- Hart, Ashley (2007) [2000]. Colossal Cracks: Montgomery's 21st Army Group in North-west Europe, 1944–45. Mechanicsburg, PA: Stackpole Books. ISBN 978-0-8117-3383-0.
- Joslen, H. F. (2003) [1960]. Orders of Battle: Second World War, 1939–1945. Uckfield, East Sussex: Naval and Military Press. ISBN 978-1-84342-474-1.
- Sanders, Jack (1979). British Guards Armoured Division 1941-1945. Osprey Vanguard.
