= 32nd Infantry Brigade (United Kingdom) =

32nd Brigade 32nd Infantry Brigade (Guards)
- Formation badge of the brigade
- Active: 1914–1919; 1941–1946
- Country: United Kingdom
- Branch: British Army
- Type: Infantry formation
- Size: Brigade
- Part of: 11th (Northern) Division; Guards Armoured Division
- Engagements: First World War; Second World War

Commanders
- Notable commanders: John Ormsby Evelyn Vandeleur

The 32nd Infantry Brigade was an infantry brigade formation of the British Army that saw active service during both the First and the Second World Wars.

== First World War ==
The Brigade was raised originally as the 32nd Infantry Brigade, part of the 11th (Northern) Division, a New Army formation which served at Gallipoli and on the Western Front during the First World War.

=== Order of battle ===
- 9th Battalion, The Prince of Wales's Own (West Yorkshire Regiment) (absorbed 1/1st Yorkshire Hussars 19 November 1917 and redesignated 9th (Yorkshire Hussars Yeomanry) Battalion)
- 6th Battalion, Alexandra, Princess of Wales Own (Yorkshire Regiment) (left 18 May 1918)
- 6th Battalion, The York and Lancaster Regiment
- 8th Battalion, The Duke of Wellington's (West Riding Regiment) (disbanded 13 February 1918)
- 2nd Battalion, Alexandra, Princess of Wales Own (Yorkshire Regiment) (joined 14 May 1918)
- 32nd Brigade Machine Gun Company (formed March 1916, moved into 11th MG Battalion 28 February 1918)
- 32nd Trench Mortar Battery (joined 17 July 1916)

== Second World War ==
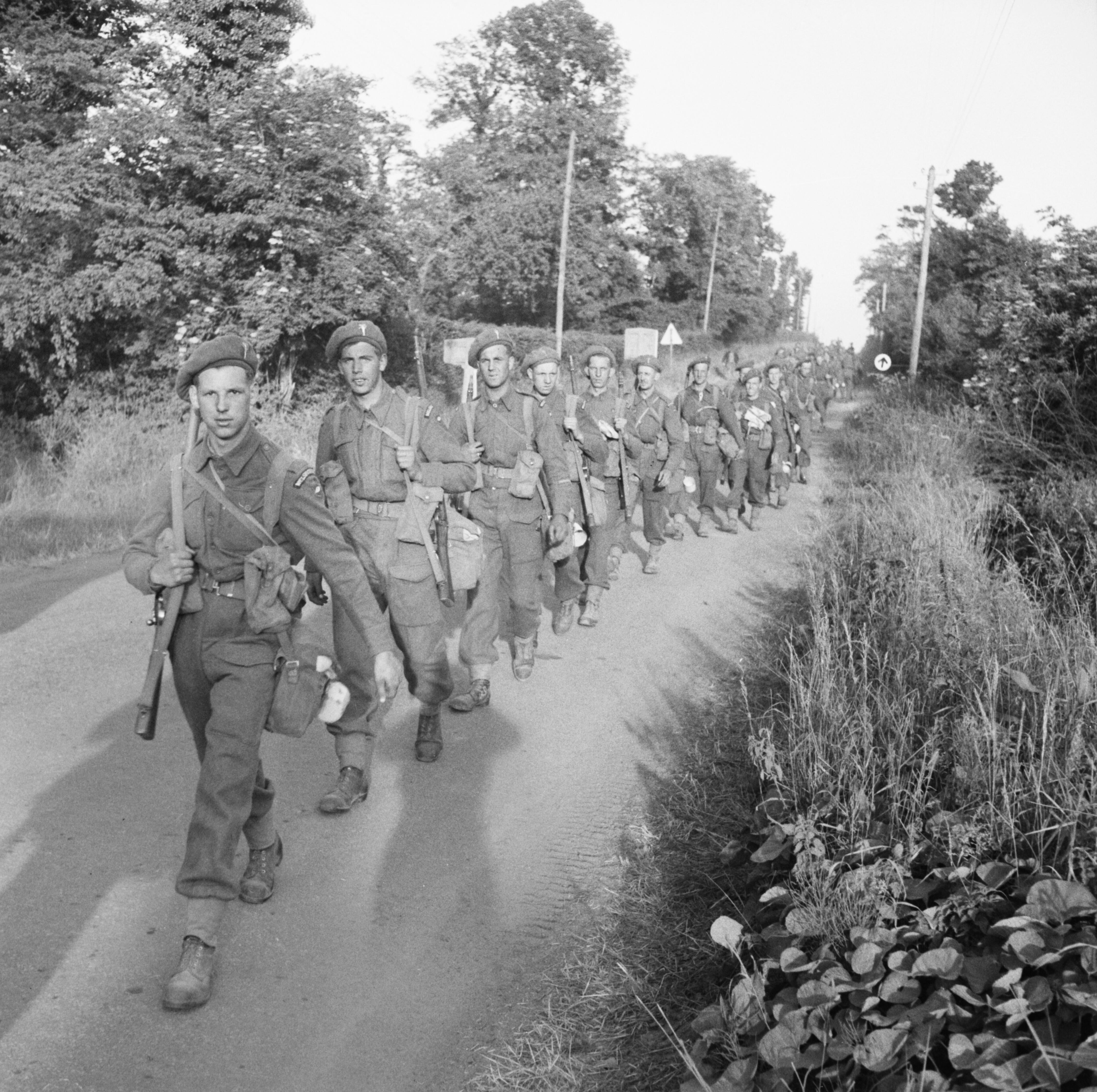
Infantrymen of the 1st Battalion, Welsh Guards, Guards Armoured Division, moving up to the front line, July 1944.

The Brigade was reformed as 32nd Infantry Brigade (Guards) on 1 October 1941, during the Second World War. In 1942, the brigade joined the Guards Armoured Division, and later saw service during Operation Overlord, the Allied advance from Paris to the Rhine, including Operation Market Garden, and the Western Allied invasion of Germany.

=== Order of battle ===
- 5th Battalion, Coldstream Guards
- 1st Battalion, Welsh Guards
- 3rd Battalion, Irish Guards
- 2nd Battalion, Scots Guards
- 2nd Battalion, Welsh Guards

=== Commanders ===
- Brigadier L. Bootle-Wilbraham
- Brigadier G.L. Verney
- Brigadier J.C.O. Marriott
- Brigadier G.F. Johnson
- Lieutenant-Colonel J.C. Windsor-Lewis
- Brigadier J.O.E. Vandeleur

== Postwar ==
The Brigade was reraised in the early 1950s and joined the 3rd Infantry Division. The Brigade was moved from Cyprus to reinforce the British forces in the Canal Zone in February 1952, but was later disbanded by being redesignated 29th Infantry Brigade.

== Bibliography ==
- Joslen, H. F. (2003) [1960]. Orders of Battle: Second World War, 1939–1945. Uckfield, East Sussex: Naval and Military Press. ISBN 978-1-84342-474-1.
