= Julian Gascoigne =

British Army officer (1903-1990)

Major-General Sir Julian Gascoigne KCMG KCVO CB DSO DL
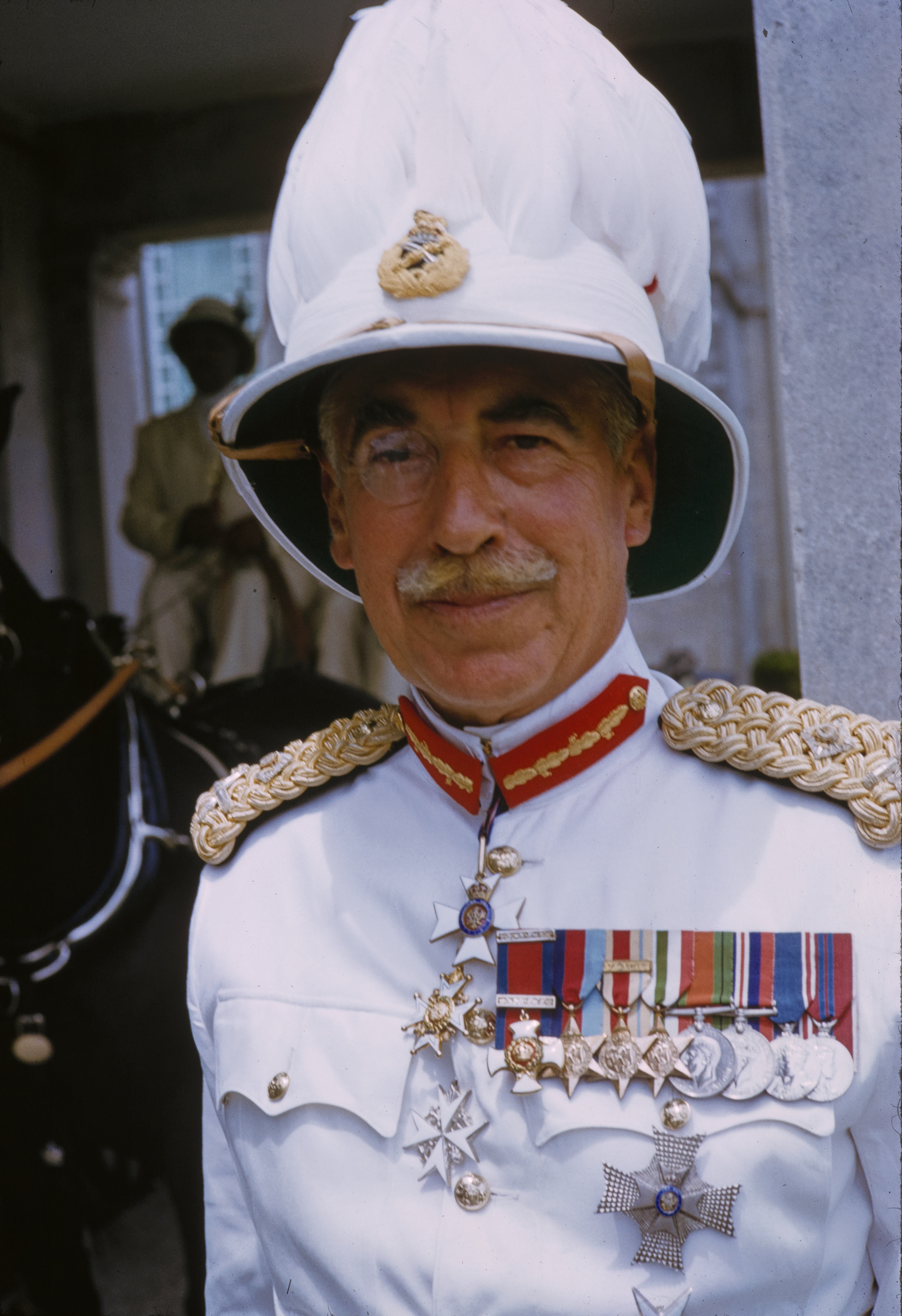
- Gascoigne in the uniform of governor of Bermuda, 1960

Governor of Bermuda
- In office 1959–1964
- Monarch: Elizabeth II
- Preceded by: Sir John Woodall
- Succeeded by: Lord Martonmere

Personal details
- Born: 25 October 1903 Ashtead, Surrey, England
- Died: 26 February 1990 (aged 86)
- Spouse: Joyce Newman (m. 1928)
- Children: 2
- Relatives: Bamber Gascoigne (nephew)
- Occupation: Stockbroker
- Military career
- Allegiance: United Kingdom
- Branch: British Army
- Service years: 1923–1953
- Rank: Major-General
- Service number: 27192
- Unit: Grenadier Guards
- Commands: London District; 201st Guards Motor Brigade; 1st Battalion, Grenadier Guards
- Conflicts: Second World War; North African campaign; Second Battle of El Alamein; Syria–Lebanon campaign; Italian campaign; Operation Avalanche
- Awards: Knight Commander of the Order of St Michael and St George; Knight Commander of the Royal Victorian Order; Companion of the Order of the Bath; Distinguished Service Order

Major-General Sir Julian Alvery Gascoigne, KCMG, KCVO, CB, DSO, DL (/ˈɡæskɔɪn/ GASK-oyn; 25 October 1903 – 26 February 1990) was a senior British Army officer who served in the Second World War and became major-general commanding the Household Brigade and general officer commanding London District. After retiring from the army, he worked as a stockbroker and then served as Governor and military commander-in-chief of Bermuda (an Imperial fortress that had been greatly diminished by the North Atlantic Treaty Organization alliance) from 1959 to 1964.

== Early life and education ==
Gascoigne was born on 25 October 1903 at Ashtead Lodge, Ashtead, Surrey, England. His father was Brigadier-General Sir Frederick Gascoigne, KCVO, CMG, DSO. He was educated at Eton College, an all-boys public boarding school.

== Military career ==
Gascoigne entered the Royal Military College, Sandhurst and was commissioned as a second lieutenant into the Grenadier Guards in 1923. From 1927 to 1928, he served as aide de camp to Sir Stanley Jackson, the then Governor of Bengal. He was an instructor at Sandhurst in 1935, and attended the Staff College, Camberley from 1938 to 1939.

During the early part of the Second World War, from 1939 to 1941, Gascoigne served as a staff officer in and around London. He was commanding officer of the 1st Battalion, Grenadier Guards from 1941 to 1942, and of the 201st Guards Motor Brigade from 1942 to 1943. He saw active service in Egypt, Syria, North Africa and Italy. He fought at the Battle of Alamein, with the Eighth Army in Tunis, and in Salerno as part of the Allied invasion of Italy. He was seriously wounded during fighting at Monte Camino in 1943, and was evacuated back to the UK where he spent time recuperating in hospital. He was an instructor at the Staff College, Camberley from 1944 until the end of the war.

After the war, he attended the Imperial Defence College in 1946. From 1947 to 1949, he served as deputy commander of the British Joint Services Mission in Washington, D.C. He was appointed major-general commanding the Household Brigade and general officer commanding London District in 1950. During his time as "The Major General", he oversaw the funeral of King George VI and the coronation of Queen Elizabeth II.

Gascoigne retired from the army in 1953.

== Later career ==
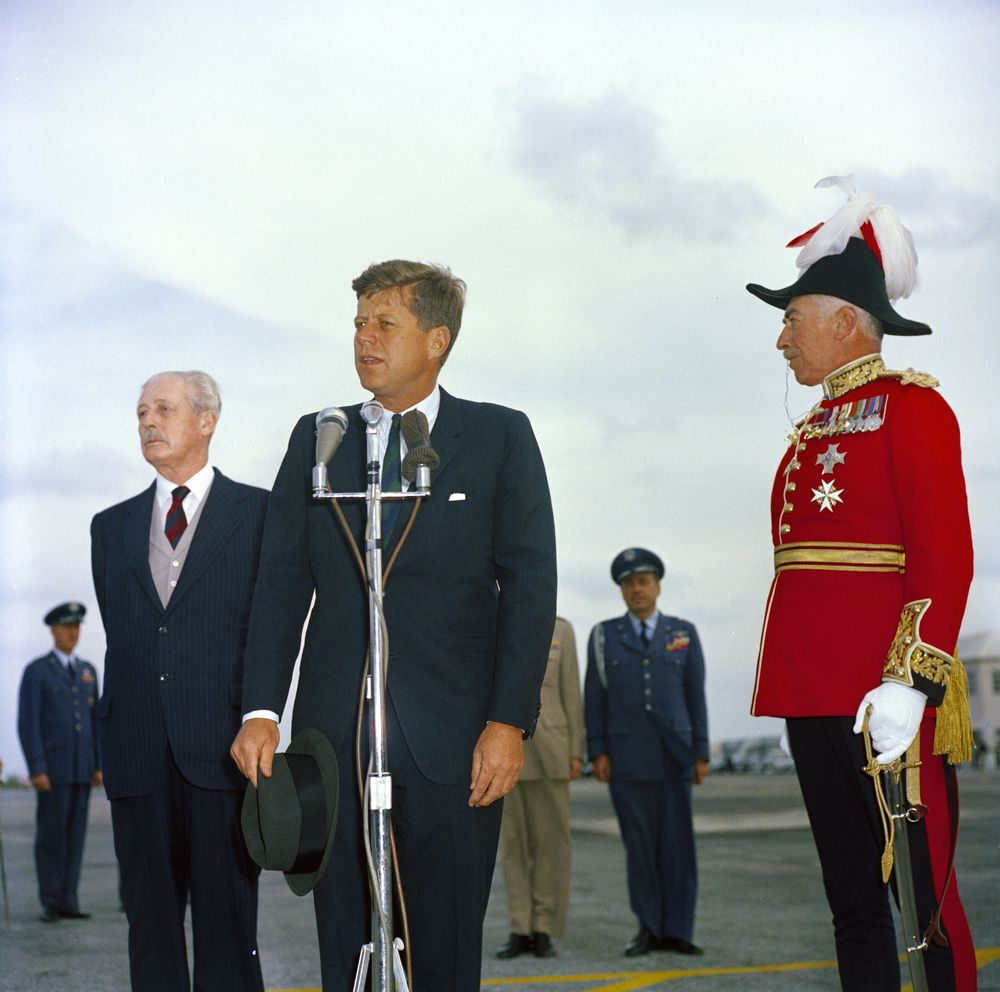
Gascoigne (right) with US President John F. Kennedy (centre) in Bermuda on 21 December 1961.

In retirement he worked as a stockbroker from 1955 to 1959 and was then Governor of Bermuda (combining the roles of civil governor and military commander-in-chief of the Bermuda Command) from 1959 to 1964. He hosted an important summit meeting in December 1961 between British Prime Minister Harold Macmillan and U.S. President John F. Kennedy, following the erection of the Berlin Wall.

== Personal life ==
By 1970 he was President of the Union Jack Club in London.

In 1928, he married Joyce Newman. Together, they had one son and one daughter. He was an uncle of University Challenge host Bamber Gascoigne.

Military offices
Preceded by Sir John Marriott	GOC London District; 1950–1953	Succeeded by Sir George Johnson
Preceded by Alan Brooke, 1st Viscount Alanbrooke	Colonel Commandant and President, Honourable Artillery Company; 1954–1959	Succeeded by Sir Richard Goodbody
