= 21st Brigade (United Kingdom) =

21st Brigade 21st Infantry Brigade
- Active: 1914–1918; 1940
- Country: United Kingdom
- Branch: British Army
- Type: Infantry
- Size: Brigade
- Part of: 7th Division
- Engagements: Second Boer War; World War I World War II

Commanders
- Notable commanders: Maj-Gen Bruce Hamilton; Brig J.C.O. Marriott

21st Brigade (21st Bde) was an infantry formation of the British Army first organised in the Second Boer War, when it took part in Ian Hamilton's March from Bloemfontein to Pretoria. Reformed in World War I it served under the command of first 7th Division and then 30th Division, fighting in most of the major battles on the Western Front from the First Battle of Ypres to the Armistice. It was briefly re-raised in the Sudan early in World War II before being transferred to the Indian Army.

== Second Boer War ==
British Army brigades had traditionally been ad hoc formations known by the name of their commander or numbered as an integral part of a division. However, units deployed to the Second Boer War in 1899 were organised into sequentially numbered brigades that were frequently reassigned between divisions. 21st Brigade was formed in South Africa in April 1900 under the command of Major-General Bruce Hamilton. Bruce Hamilton (described as a 'superb fighting general') had begun the war a substantive Major and Brevet Colonel serving as Assistant Adjutant General of 2nd Division, and had been wounded in the action at Venter's Spruit on 20 January. His new brigade comprised three Regular infantry battalions together with the famous City Imperial Volunteers (CIV), recently arrived from Britain.

=== Order of Battle 1900 ===
The composition of 21st Bde in April–June 1900 was as follows:

- 76th Battery, Royal Field Artillery (RFA) – arrived in South Africa from Ireland in January 1900 as part of X Brigade-Division, Royal Field Artillery, in 6th Division and had served at the Battle of Paardeberg.
- 1st Battalion Royal Sussex Regiment – arrived in South Africa from Malta in March 1900.
- 1st Battalion Derbyshire Regiment – arrived in South Africa from Egypt in December 1899 and had served at the Orange River Crossing and then in 22nd Bde of 3rd Division in the Mafeking relief operations.
- 1st Battalion Cameron Highlanders) – arrived in South Africa from Egypt in April and had been in the operations near Bloemfontein.
- Infantry Battalion, City Imperial Volunteers (CIV) – arrived in South Africa from England in February and had seen some action at De Aar.
- Bearer Company and Field Hospital, Royal Army Medical Corps.

=== Bloemfontein to Pretoria ===
21st Brigade began operations as part of Lord Roberts' force and was then assigned to Lieutenant-General Ian Hamilton's Winburg Column. This force operated on Lord Roberts' right flank during the advance into the Orange Free State.

Hamilton's Column left Bloemfontein on 22 April and took part in the following general actions in a march of over 450 miles (720 km) in 45 days:

- Israel's Poorte, 25 April
- Houtnek, 30 April–1 May
- Welkom, 4 May
- Passage of the Sand River, 10 May: 21st Brigade crossed the river covered by artillery fire and deployed on a wide front before advancing, the Sussex and CIV coming under heavy fire.
- Affair of Lindley, 20 May
- Doornkop, 29 May: Hamilton attacked a force of several thousand Boers occupying a group of kopjes east of the town. While the cavalry worked round the left flank the widely-dispersed infantry advanced against the Boer centre at 15.00, with 19th Brigade on the right and 21st on the left. The CIV led Bruce Hamilton's attack, which according to Winston Churchill (observing as a war correspondent) was 'pressed with vigour, and directed with skill', the CIV advancing 'with great dash and spirit'. During the advance the two brigades diverged, but the Sussex and an artillery battery were pushed forward into the gap. After exchanges of rifle fire, the CIV clearing Roodepoort, the Boers began to pull back and were shelled as they retreated. The British casualties were not heavy except in 19th Bde. Advancing 6 miles (9.7 km) on to Florida, the force found sufficient supplies to continue the advance while the convoys caught up.
- Six Mile Spruit (Pretoria), 4 June
- Battle of Diamond Hill, 11–12 June: The Boers made a stand beyond Pretoria, and after a fierce action involving the cavalry and mounted infantry (MI), Bruce Hamilton was ordered to advance against a scrub-covered ridge in front of the main Diamond Hill ridge. After an artillery preparation the Sussex established themselves on the northern end of the ridge while the CIV and MI held the Boers frontally and slowly rolled up other end. The Boers began to withdraw, but in crossing the open ground before the main hill they came under heavy rifle fire from Hamilton's men. Next day (12 June) the advance was resumed: once 1st (Guards) Brigade had come up in support, 21st Bde began the attack at 13.00. The Derbyshires (Sherwood Foresters), who had been skirmishing in the morning, now advanced up a flat tongue of land to the right, the CIV in the centre, and the Sussex on the left. The advance was exposed to enfilade fire from pom-pom guns but the infantry made lodgements along the rim of the Diamond Hill plateau. Here they were exposed to fire from another kopje and casualties began to mount. 82nd Battery, RFA, was brought up to suppress this fire, and by 16.00 the Guards and more batteries were up. Fighting died down at sunset, and the Boers withdrew during the night.

=== Guerrilla warfare ===
After Diamond Hill and the occupation of Pretoria and Johannesburg the war resolved into a lengthy guerrilla campaign conducted on the British side by ad hoc columns, often mounted. The CIV and Derbyshires left 21st Bde on convoy work, but the other units participated in the battle of Retiefs Nek (24 July) and the capture of the main Orange Free State force at the Brandwater Basin (30 July). Having covered 1,200 miles (1,900 km) since 28 April, 21st Bde began a new 80 miles (130 km) march on 28 August. Its task was first to relieve a surrounded force of MI and Imperial Yeomanry, during which it captured Commandant Olivier and his force, then to rescue a force of Royal Marine Light Infantry and Yeomanry, to rout Commandant Fourie's force on 4 September. Thereafter its units continued to participate individually in the efforts to catch Christiaan de Wet and the other Boer forces still at large – Bruce Hamilton still had the Sussex and Cameron Highlanders with him during the autumn campaign – but the brigade organisation had disappeared.

== World War I ==
It was assigned to the 7th Division and later to 30th Division, serving on the Western Front during World War I.

=== Order of battle ===
The composition of the brigade was:

- 2nd Battalion, Bedfordshire Regiment – transferred to 89th Brigade, 20 December 1915.
- 2nd Battalion, Alexandra, Princess of Wales's Own (Yorkshire Regiment) – left May 1918.
- 2nd Battalion, Royal Scots Fusiliers – transferred to 90th Brigade, 20 December 1915.
- 2nd Battalion, The Duke of Edinburgh's (Wiltshire Regiment) – left May 1918.
- 18th (Service) Battalion, King's Regiment (Liverpool) – joined from 89th Brigade, 20 December 1915, rejoined 89th Brigade, February 1918.
- 19th (Service) Battalion, Manchester Regiment (4th City) – joined from 90th Brigade, 20 December 1915, disbanded February 1918.
- 17th (Service) Battalion, Manchester Regiment (2nd City) – joined February 1918, left as cadre June 1918.
- 2/5th (Service) Battalion, Lincolnshire Regiment – joined May 1918, left June 1918.
- 21st Machine Gun Company – joined 8 March 1916, moved to 30th Battalion Machine Gun Corps (M.G.C.) 1 March 1918.
- 21st Trench Mortar Battery – formed by 5 July 1916.

On reorganisation in July 1918:

- 7th (South Irish Horse) Battalion, The Royal Irish Regiment
- 1/6th Battalion, Cheshire Regiment
- 2/23rd (County of London) Battalion, London Regiment
- 21st Trench Mortar Battery

== World War II ==
The brigade was reformed in World War II. The brigade Headquarters were formed in the Sudan on 24 July 1940, commanded by Brigadier J.C.O. Marriott and, as in World War I, consisting of three Regular Army battalions. However, with the arrival of the 5th Indian Infantry Division, which at the time consisted only of two brigades, the brigade was transferred to the Indian Army establishment and subsequently, on 12 October 1940, redesignated as the 29th Indian Infantry Brigade and the battalions were posted to the other two brigades of 5th Indian Division, the 2nd West Yorkshire Regiment to the 9th Indian Infantry Brigade and 1st Essex Regiment to 10th Indian Infantry Brigade.

=== Order of battle ===
- 2nd Battalion, West Yorkshire Regiment
- 1st Battalion, Essex Regiment
- 1st Battalion, Worcestershire Regiment
