= John Marriott (British Army officer) =

British Army general (1895–1978)

Major-General Sir John Marriott KCVO CB DSO* MC
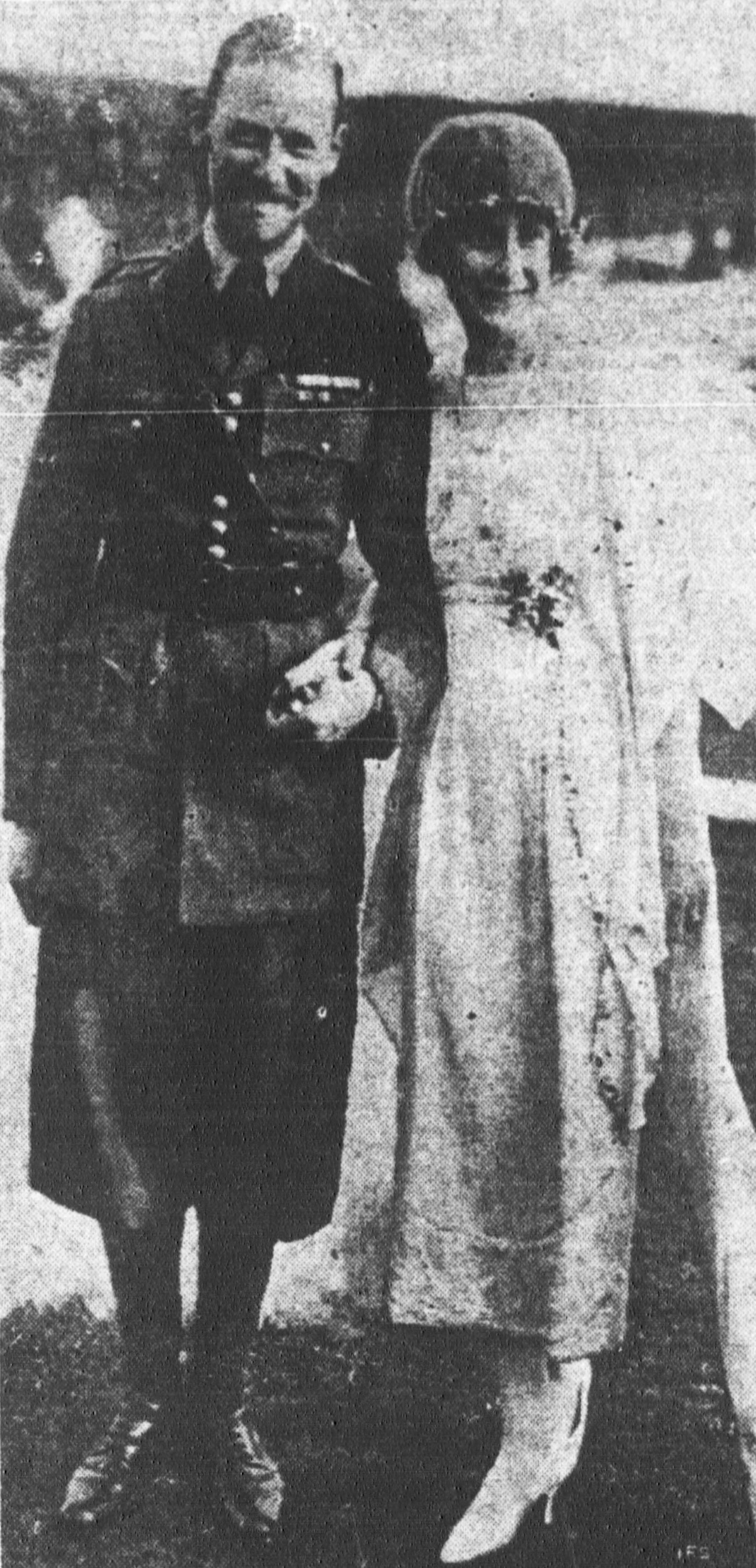
- Marriott and his wife, pictured in 1920.
- Born: 29 June 1895; Stowmarket, Suffolk, England
- Died: 11 September 1978 (aged 83); Kensington, London, England
- Military career
- Allegiance: United Kingdom
- Branch: British Army
- Service years: 1914–1950
- Rank: Major-General
- Service number: 9506
- Units: Northamptonshire Regiment; Scots Guards
- Commands: London District; Guards Division; 32nd Guards Brigade; 22nd Guards Brigade; 29th Indian Infantry Brigade; 21st Infantry Brigade; 2nd Battalion, Scots Guards
- Conflicts: First World War; Second World War: East African Campaign; Western Desert campaign
- Awards: Knight Commander of the Royal Victorian Order; Companion of the Order of the Bath; Distinguished Service Order & Bar; Military Cross; Mentioned in despatches Croix de guerre (France)

Major-General Sir John Charles Oakes Marriott, KCVO, CB, DSO & Bar, MC (29 June 1895 – 11 September 1978) was a senior British Army officer who served during the First World War and again in the Second World War.

== Military career ==
John Marriott was born in Stowmarket, Suffolk, on 29 June 1895. He was educated at Repton School and later entered the Royal Military College at Sandhurst, from where he graduated and was commissioned as a second lieutenant into the Northamptonshire Regiment in 1914, the year the First World War began. Promoted to lieutenant on 10 May 1915, he served in the war as a staff captain with the 7th Infantry Brigade in France and then as a General Staff Officer (GSO) with the 66th (2nd East Lancashire) Division. Marriott won both the Distinguished Service Order (DSO) and Military Cross, as well as the French Croix de guerre during his wartime service.

He remained in the army after the war and during the interwar period, initially serving as a GSO to the military attaché in Washington, D.C. He transferred to the Scots Guards in 1920. He was made Deputy Assistant Adjutant & Quartermaster General for London District in 1933. Appointed a Member of the Royal Victorian Order in 1935 and elevated to Commander in 1937, Marriott was made commanding officer (CO) of the 2nd Battalion, Scots Guards in 1938.

He served with distinction in the Second World War, initially in the Middle East and from 1940 as CO of the 21st Infantry Brigade. From October 1940 he commanded the 29th Indian Infantry Brigade, part of the 5th Indian Infantry Division, in the East African Campaign for which he received a Bar to his DSO. In October 1941, on his return to the Western Desert, he was placed in command of the 22nd Guards Brigade, which was renamed successively 200th Guards Brigade and 201st Guards Motor Brigade in the following months. He successfully managed to avoid capture when the brigade was forced to surrender when Tobruk was captured during the Battle of Gazala on 20 June 1942 by German and Italian forces. He returned to the United Kingdom and from September 1942 to December 1943 he took command of the 32nd Guards Brigade, part of the Guards Armoured Division, before being made deputy director of Infantry at the War Office in London from late 1943.

After the war he was promoted to acting major-general on 15 October 1945 and became General Officer Commanding (GOC) of the Guards Division in Germany in 1945 and Major-General commanding the Brigade of Guards and GOC London District in 1947; he retired from the army, after a career spanning three decades, in 1950.

== Family ==
The Marriott family grave in Brookwood Cemetery in 2018.

In 1920 he married Maud (Momo) Emily Wolff Kahn (1897–1960), the daughter of Otto Hermann Kahn, investment banker, collector, philanthropist, and patron of the arts. They had one child, John Oakes Marriott (1921–2007) who never married. The three are buried together in Brookwood Cemetery in Surrey.

== Publications ==
- Marriott, John Charles Oakes (1931). Admiral of New England: The exploits of John Smith: his London epitaph. Times Pub. Co. OCLC 28725928.

== Bibliography ==
- Brett-James, Antony (1951). Ball of fire – The Fifth Indian Division in the Second World War. Gale & Polden. pp. 481 pages. Archived from the original on 27 March 2020.
- Mackenzie, Compton (1951). Eastern Epic. Chatto & Windus, London. pp. 623 pages.
- Marriott, Sir John (1946). Memories of Four-Score Years: The Autobiography of Sir John Marriott. London: Blackie.

Military offices
Preceded by Allan Adair	GOC Guards Division; 1945–1946	Succeeded by Division disbanded
Preceded by Sir Charles Loyd	GOC London District; 1947–1950	Succeeded by Sir Julian Gascoigne
