= Joe Vandeleur =

British army officer (1903–1988)

Brigadier Joe Vandeleur DSO*
- Brigadier Joe Vandeleur during World War II
- Born: 14 November 1903; Nowshera, British Raj (now Pakistan)
- Died: 4 August 1988 (aged 84); Maidenhead, Berkshire, England
- Burial place: Brookwood Cemetery
- Military career
- Allegiance: United Kingdom
- Branch: British Army
- Service years: 1924–1951
- Rank: Brigadier
- Service number: 28140
- Unit: Irish Guards
- Commands: 3rd Battalion, Irish Guards; 129th Infantry Brigade; 32nd Guards Brigade
- Conflicts: World War II
- Awards: Distinguished Service Order and Bar

John Ormsby Evelyn Vandeleur, DSO and Bar (14 November 1903 – 4 August 1988), usually known as Joe Vandeleur from his initials, was an Anglo-Irish British Army officer who served in the Second World War.

== Early life ==
Born in Nowshera in British India (now Pakistan), Vandeleur was the son of Colonel Crofton Bury Vandeleur and Evelyn O'Leary. His family was originally from Kilrush, County Clare, where they were the local landlords.

== Military career ==
Vandeleur's grave in Brookwood Cemetery in 2019

Vandeleur was commissioned into the Irish Guards as a second lieutenant in 1924, serving in Sudan and Egypt before the war.

As commanding officer of the 3rd Battalion, Irish Guards, he led the breakout of XXX Corps during Operation Market Garden. His second cousin Lieutenant-Colonel Giles Vandeleur (their grandfathers were brothers) was acting commanding officer of the 2nd Armoured Battalion, Irish Guards. He went on to command the 129th Infantry Brigade and 32nd Guards Brigade. He retired from the Army in 1951.

== After military service ==
Vandeleur acted as a military consultant to the production of the 1977 feature film A Bridge Too Far. Michael Caine played Vandeleur and Michael Byrne played Giles Vandeleur.

His memoirs A Soldier's Story were privately printed by Gale & Polden in 1967.

== Later life and death ==
He married Felicity Bury-Barry, who died in 1948. He later married Norah Christie-Miller (who was a Vandeleur cousin on her mother's side).

After the war, Vandeleur resided in a manor house in Pinkneys Green, near Maidenhead in Berkshire.

He died in Maidenhead in 1988 and was buried in Brookwood Cemetery. His grave is marked by a simple headstone inscribed only "J.O.E. V. 1903 – 1988" and underneath "Once an Irish Guardsman".

== See also ==
- Joe's Bridge, the nickname given to Bridge No.9 on the Maas–Scheldt Canal in the Belgian city of Lommel just south of the Belgian–Dutch border.

== Bibliography ==
- Doherty, Richard (2004). Ireland's Generals in the Second World War. Four Courts Press. ISBN 9781851828654.
