= Operation Charnwood =

Second World War Anglo-Canadian offensive

Coordinates: 49°10′59″N 0°22′10″W

- Part of the Battle for Caen
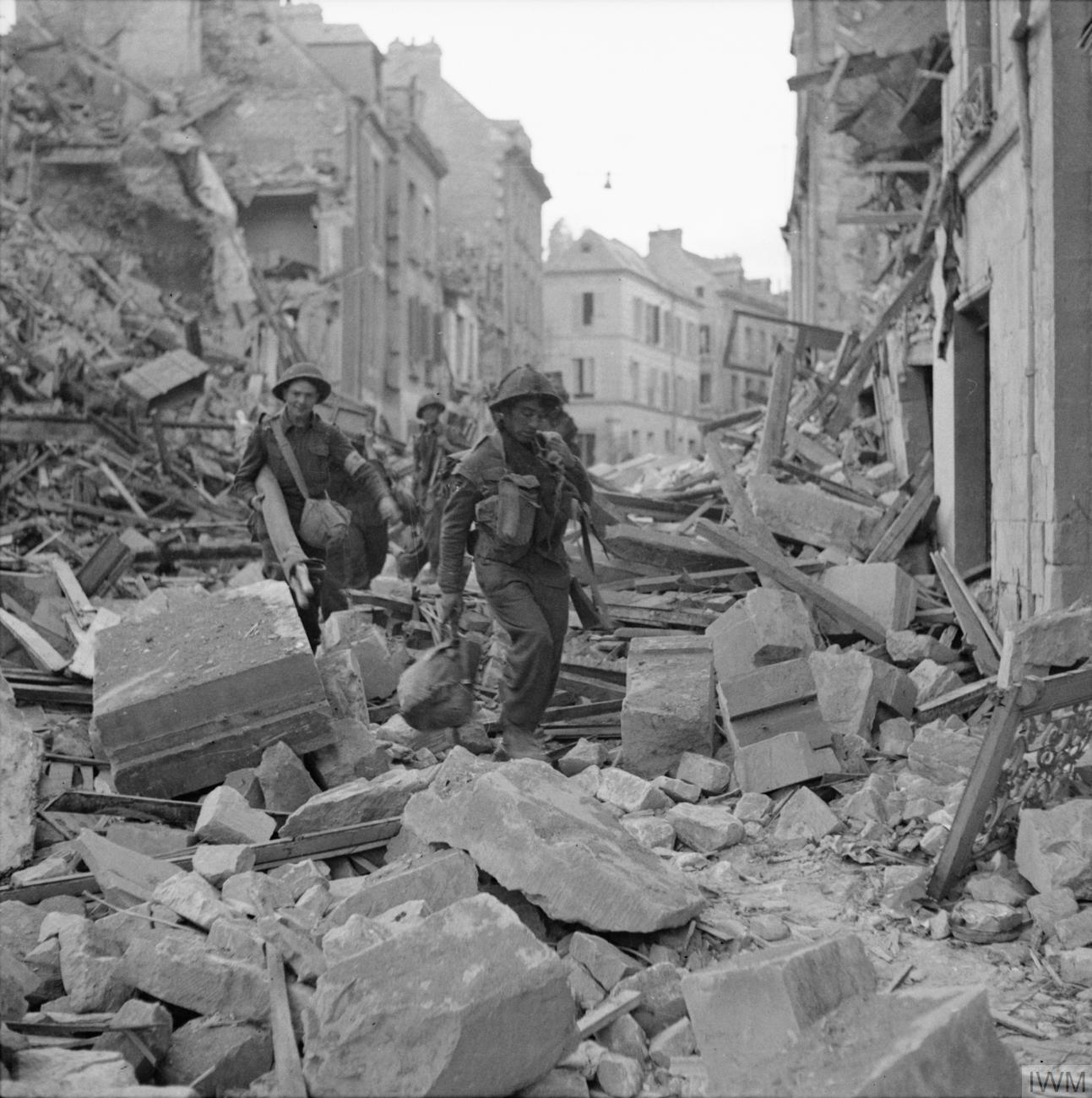
- British troops of I Corps pick their way through the rubble of Caen, 9 July 1944
Date	8–9 July 1944
Location	Northern Caen, Normandy, France
Result	Allied victory

Belligerents
United Kingdom; Canada	Germany

Commanders and leaders
Miles Dempsey; John Crocker	Heinrich Eberbach; Sepp Dietrich

Strength
3 infantry divisions; 3 armoured brigades	Elements of 1 infantry division; 1 armoured division; 61 tanks (Note: The 12th SS Panzer Division's tank strength on 7 July was 24 Panthers and 37 Panzer IVs.)

Casualties and losses
3,817 casualties; ~80 tanks (Note: Major Ellis, the British official campaign historian, states that about 80 tanks were either destroyed or put out of action during the operation.)	Over 2,000 casualties; 18–32 tanks (Note: The 12th SS Panzer Division recorded the loss of 11 Panthers and 7 Panzer IVs.) (Note: Buckley and Reynolds report that the 12th SS Panzer lost 10 Panthers and 22 Panzer IVs destroyed during the operation; Reynolds specifically stating these losses were for 8 July only.)
- 300–400 French civilian casualties

Operation Charnwood was an Anglo-Canadian offensive that took place from 8 to 9 July 1944, during the Battle for Caen, part of the larger Operation Overlord (code-name for the Battle of Normandy) in the Second World War. The operation was intended to capture the German-occupied city of Caen (French pronunciation: [kɑ̃]), which was an important objective for the Allies during the opening stages of Overlord. It was also hoped that the attack would forestall the transfer of German armoured units from the Anglo-Canadian sector to the American sector to the west, where an offensive was being prepared. The British and Canadians advanced on a broad front and by the evening of the second day had taken Caen up to the Orne and Odon rivers.

Preceded by a controversial bombing raid that destroyed much of the historic Old City of Caen, Operation Charnwood began at dawn on 8 July, with three infantry divisions attacking German positions north of Caen, behind a creeping barrage. Supported by three armoured brigades, the British I Corps made gradual progress against the 12th SS Panzer Division Hitlerjugend and the 16th Luftwaffe Field Division. By the end of the day the 3rd Canadian Division and the British 3rd Infantry Division and 59th (Staffordshire) Infantry Division had cleared the villages in their path and reached the outskirts of the city. Moving into Caen at dawn the following morning, the Allies encountered resistance from remnants of German units who were beginning a withdrawal across the Orne. Carpiquet airfield fell to the Canadians during the early morning and by 18:00, the British and Canadians had linked up along the north bank of the Orne. The remaining bridges were defended or impassable and with German reserves opposite, I Corps ended the operation.

Operation Charnwood was mutually costly and a tactical success for the Allies. The Germans retired from north of the Orne River but did not stop sending formations to the American front. The Germans established another defensive line along two ridges to the south of the city. The Allies maintained the initiative and began Operation Jupiter the next day and Operation Goodwood and Operation Atlantic a week later, in which the rest of Caen was secured.

== Background ==
The Norman city of Caen was one of the D-Day objectives for the British 3rd Infantry Division which landed on Sword Beach on 6 June 1944. The capture of Caen, while "ambitious", was the most important D-Day objective assigned to the British I Corps (Lieutenant-General Sir John Crocker).

The quick capture of that key city [Caen] and the neighbourhood of Carpiquet was the most ambitious, the most difficult and the most important task of Lieutenant-General J. T. Crocker's I Corps.

— Lionel Ellis

The initial Overlord plan called for the British Second Army to secure the city and then form a front line from Caumont-l'Éventé to the south-east of Caen, to acquire space for airfields and to protect the left flank of the United States First Army while it moved on Cherbourg. Possession of Caen and its environs would give the Second Army a suitable staging area for a push south to capture Falaise, which could then be used as the pivot for a swing left to advance on Argentan and then towards the Touques River. The terrain between Caen and Vimont was especially attractive to Allied planners, being open, dry and conducive to swift offensive operations. Since the Allies greatly outnumbered the Germans in tanks and mobile units, creating the conditions for a fluid, fast moving battle was to their advantage.

The 3rd Infantry Division came ashore as planned but was hampered by congestion in its beachhead, diversions en route and the late arrival of much of its armoured support. The division was unable to assault Caen in force and its lead elements were brought to a halt short of the outskirts. Later attacks failed as the German defenders were reinforced by the 12th SS Panzer Division Hitlerjugend. On 7 June the British began Operation Perch, a pincer attack by I Corps and XXX Corps, to encircle Caen from the east and west flanks. The I Corps attack south of the Orne River was halted by the 21st Panzer Division and the XXX Corps attack to the west of Caen was contained near Tilly-sur-Seulles by the Panzer-Lehr Division. To force the Panzer-Lehr Division to withdraw the British 7th Armoured Division attacked the western flank of the division on 13 June, through a gap created by the 1st US Infantry Division, to reach high ground near Villers-Bocage. In the Battle of Villers-Bocage, the 7th Armoured Division vanguard was ordered to retire and the Panzer-Lehr Division held its positions until XXX Corps captured Tilly-sur-Seulles on 19 June.

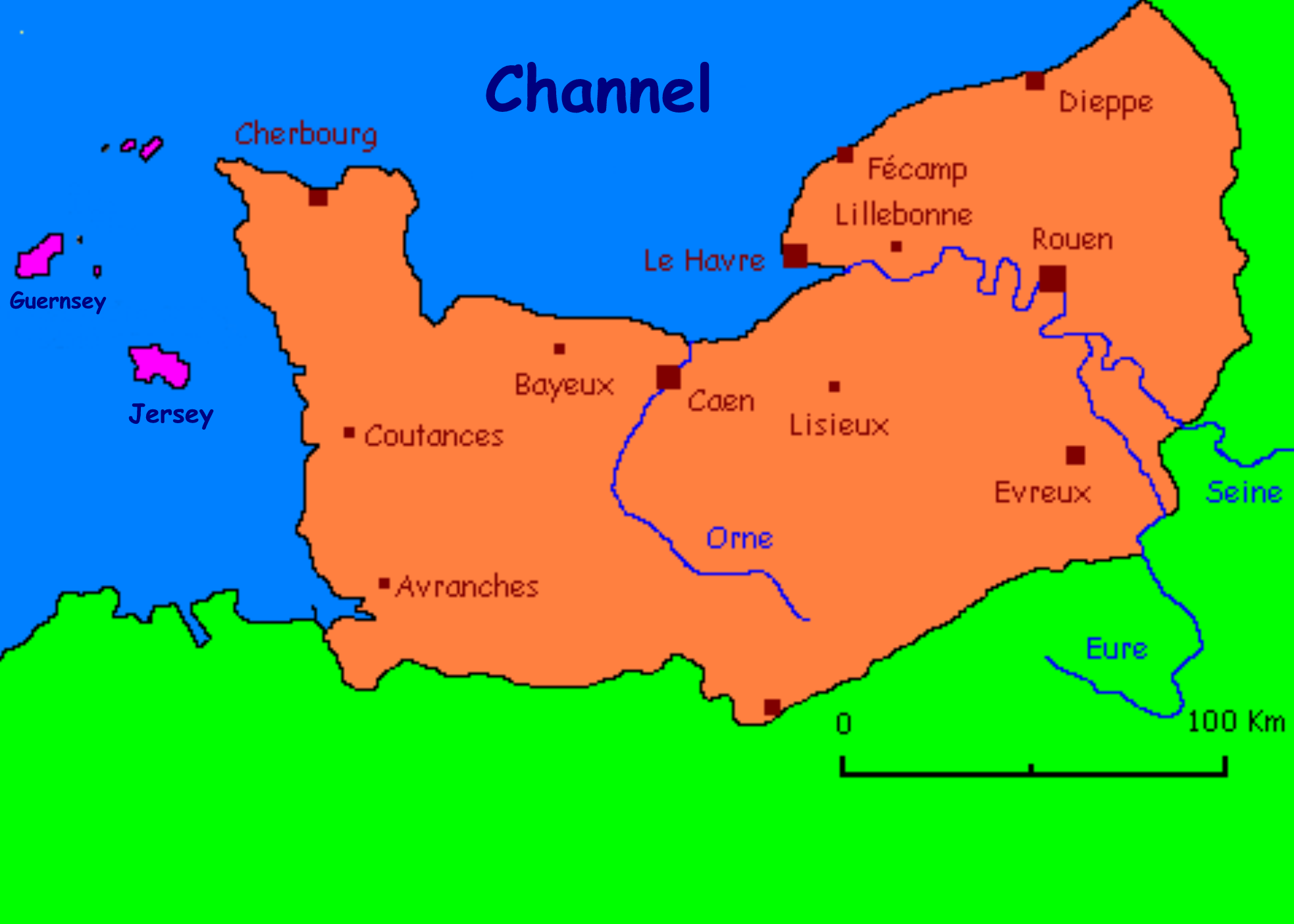
Normandy

The next British offensive, codenamed Operation Epsom, was launched by VIII Corps on 26 June, after Operation Martlet (also known as Operation Dauntless) a preliminary attack on 25 June, to secure the right flank of VIII Corps. VIII Corps advanced to the west of Caen on a 4 mi (6.4 km) front from Rauray to Carpiquet. Once across the Odon and Orne rivers, VIII Corps was to make for high ground near Bretteville-sur-Laize and encircle Caen. The Germans managed to contain the offensive by committing all their strength, including the 9th SS-Panzer Division Hohenstaufen and 10th SS-Panzer Division Frundsberg of the II SS Panzer Corps, which had been sent from the Eastern Front soon after the D-Day and had been intended for a counter-offensive against Bayeux.

On 27 June, the 8th Infantry Brigade (1st Suffolk Regiment, 2nd East Yorkshire Regiment, 1st South Lancashire Regiment) of the 3rd Infantry Division, supported by the Staffordshire Yeomanry, of the 27th Armoured Brigade, and specialist armour from the 79th Armoured Division, began Operation Mitten. The objective was to seize the German-occupied Château la Londe and Château le Landel. The initial evening assault, led by the 1st Battalion, South Lancashire Regiment was repulsed but the following morning further attacks gained the objectives and destroyed several German tanks. Operation Mitten cost at least three British tanks and 268 men. Had it succeeded quicker, the 9th Brigade, supported by the 9th Canadian Infantry Brigade, would have launched Operation Aberlour, to capture the villages of la Bijude, Épron, Galmache, St. Contest, Authie and Cussy but this follow-up operation was cancelled by Crocker. The area of the Châteaux was later called the "bloodiest square mile in Normandy".

Generalfeldmarschall Gerd von Rundstedt, supreme commander of the German forces in the west (OB West), directed on 1 July that Caen should be gradually abandoned and the bulk of the German armoured divisions be shifted to the west end of the beachhead against the US First Army but the city and its surroundings were considered by Oberkommando der Wehrmacht (OKW, Armed Forces High Command) to be fundamental to the defence of Normandy. OKW wanted an arc of defensible terrain from the English Channel to the western banks of the Orne to be held and Adolf Hitler sacked Rundstedt and replaced him with Generalfeldmarschall Günther von Kluge. Learning of this through Ultra, the Allied ground forces commander, General Bernard Montgomery, planned an offensive to capture Caen and to prevent a large redeployment of German forces from the Anglo-Canadian sector to the American front.

On 4 July, the 3rd Canadian Infantry Division conducted Operation Windsor, to seize Carpiquet and the adjacent airfield from the 12th SS-Panzer Division. Carpiquet fell on 5 July, the airfield remained in German hands.

== Prelude ==
=== Allies ===
Caen and the aiming points of the heavy bombers

Having failed to take Caen through successive flanking manoeuvres, Montgomery decided the next attack would be a frontal assault. Although Caen's strategic importance had vastly diminished since D-Day, he sought control of Bourguébus and the commanding high ground to the south. On 5 July the orders for Operation Charnwood were issued; it was to be launched at 04:20, an hour and a half before dawn on 8 July.

The objective of Charnwood was to clear Caen of its defenders up to the Orne river and if possible to secure bridgeheads in southern Caen. To achieve the latter it was planned to send an armoured column through the city to rush the bridges; it was hoped that I Corps could exploit the situation to sweep on through southern Caen towards the Bourguébus/Verrières ridge, paving the way for the British Second Army to advance towards Falaise. Historian Roger Cirillo argued the operation was designed to only clear the city of German forces; due to it being cut by both a river and a canal any attempts to make rapid progress through and beyond, were "in all probability, impossible."

Crocker's 115,000-strong I Corps was assigned the task of penetrating to the Orne and Odon rivers. The 3rd Infantry Division would attack on a one brigade front from the north-east, supported by the 33rd Armoured Brigade; the 59th (Staffordshire) Infantry Division would attack on a two brigade front from the north, supported by the 27th Armoured Brigade; and the 3rd Canadian Infantry Division would attack on a one brigade front from the northwest, supported by the 2nd Canadian Armoured Brigade. To maintain the maximum possible pressure on German forces in the sector, VIII Corps was placed on 24 hours notice to launch further attacks to the west of Caen.

In the light of lessons learned from the partial Canadian success during Operation Windsor, Charnwood was to be launched on a broad front to increase the pressure on the German defences and disperse their defensive fire. SHAEF planners had advised, on 10 June, that the best way to break a stalemate was to use air power to support an attack; this method was to be used for Charnwood as Montgomery enlisted the aid of RAF Bomber Command. Heavy bombers would attack Caen on the night preceding the assault, with 15% of the total bomb load being delayed action bombs set to explode when the ground attack was launched. A second wave of light bombers would follow the heavies and a third wave of American bombers would attack on the morning of the operation.

Additional support would be provided by rocket firing Typhoon fighter-bombers, the monitor HMS Roberts, the light cruisers HMS Belfast and HMS Emerald and the 16-inch guns of the battleship Rodney. Five divisions would contribute 656 guns for bombarding German positions to the south. In all, it was planned that 2,000 tons of bombs would be dropped on Caen before the infantry assault began. Due to the proximity of the target area to the Allied lines and the resulting risk of friendly casualties, the aiming point for the bombers was shifted 6,000 yd (3.4 mi; 5.5 km) to the south—beyond most of the main German defences screening the city. Following a long saturation bombardment, the three infantry divisions were to push through the fortified villages in their path and advance directly into Caen's northern suburbs.

=== Germans ===
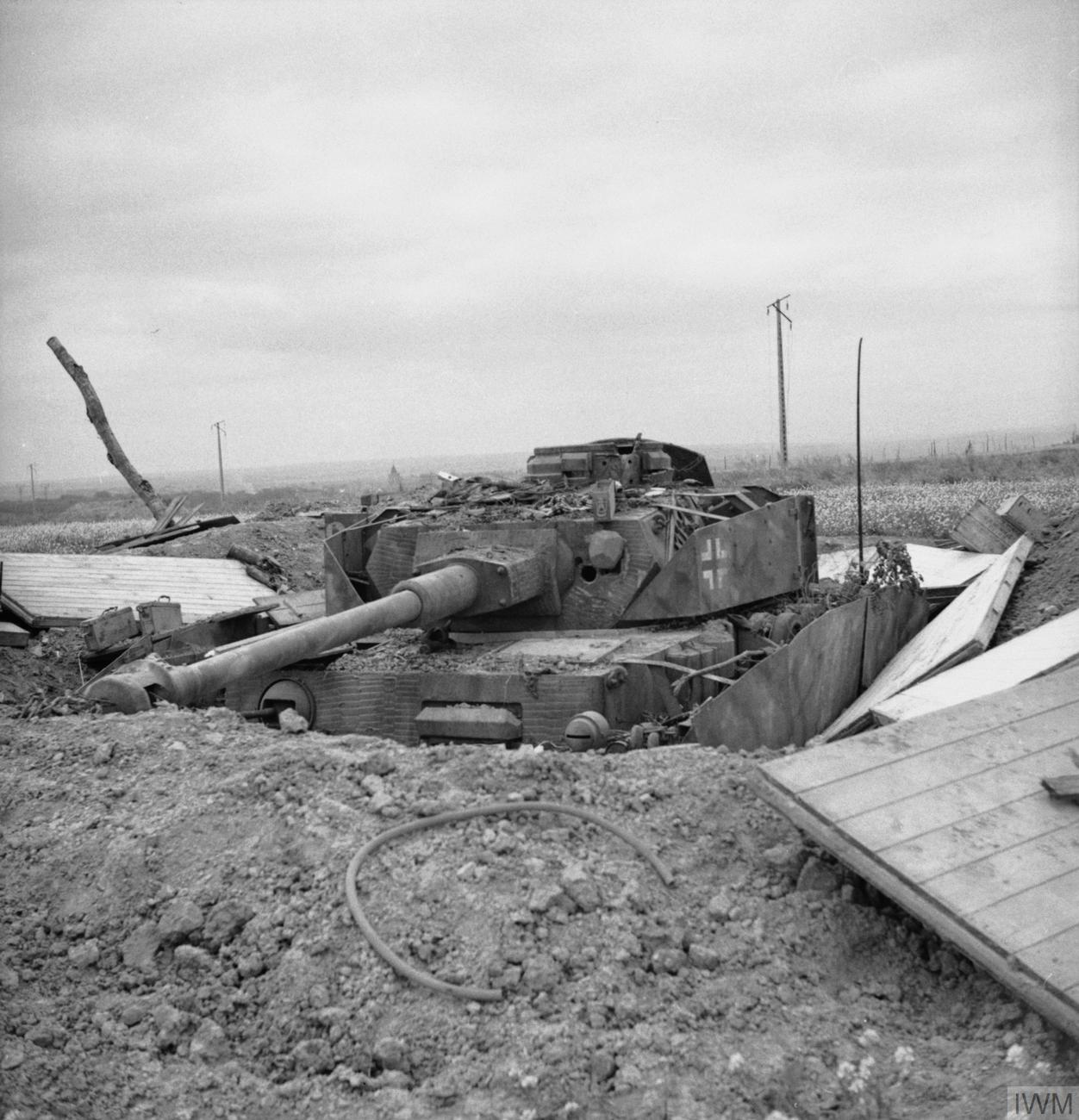
A Panzer IV of the I/22nd Panzer Regiment in a dug-in defensive position, near Lébisey

Caen's defence fell to two divisions; the 12th SS Panzer Division of I SS Panzer Corps, and the 16th Luftwaffe Field Division of LXXXVI Corps. An assault on the city was expected, and it was assumed that further attacks in the Odon valley towards the Orne river would quickly follow suit. The 12th SS Panzer Division, commanded by Kurt Meyer, consisted of three panzergrenadier regiments including one—the 1st SS Panzergrenadier Regiment—borrowed from the 1st SS Division Leibstandarte SS Adolf Hitler (1st SS Panzer Division). With its 61 surviving tanks 12th SS Panzer was holding the northwest approaches to Caen, defending the city and Carpiquet airfield from the 3rd Canadian and 59th British Infantry Divisions.

The main German defensive line, a 5.6 mi (9 km) arc of villages from the northeast to the west, was held by the 25th SS Panzergrenadier Regiment and elements of the 12th SS Panzer Regiment. Troops from the 26th SS Panzergrenadier Regiment were holding the western flank, concentrating their strength, which included mortar batteries and a few tanks, in the area around Carpiquet airfield. The 1st SS Panzergrenadier Regiment was occupying a line from Franqueville to the western end of Éterville; the villages formed mutually-supporting strongpoints with dug-in tanks and assault guns, and the defensive line was 2–3 miles (3.2–4.8 km) in depth, supplemented by anti-tank ditches, weapons pits, minefields and other obstacles. The rest of the division, with 35 tanks of the 12th SS Panzer Regiment, were held in reserve, with elements located north, west and south of the city. Most of the division's artillery had been moved back across the Orne, and the divisional command centre had been relocated from the Ardenne Abbey to Abbaye-aux-Dames in the centre of Caen.

The 16th Luftwaffe Field Division was an inexperienced infantry division that had only recently arrived in Normandy to relieve the 21st Panzer Division of its defence of Caen and its positions east of the Caen canal. The division was under-trained and lacked sufficient anti-tank weapons; to remedy the latter it was reinforced with a tank battalion from 21st Panzer. The Luftwaffe division was deployed on both sides of the Orne, with three battalions holding the villages to the immediate north of the city. (Note: Two battalions of the 31st Luftwaffe Rifles Regiment and the divisional fusilier battalion.) The 1st SS Panzer Division was roughly 5 mi (8.0 km) south of Caen with a regiment of dual purpose 88 mm guns from the III Flak Corps. The II SS Panzer Korps was to the west, with the 10th SS Panzer Division Frundsberg around 2 mi (3.2 km) south-west of the city.

=== Air attack, 7 July ===
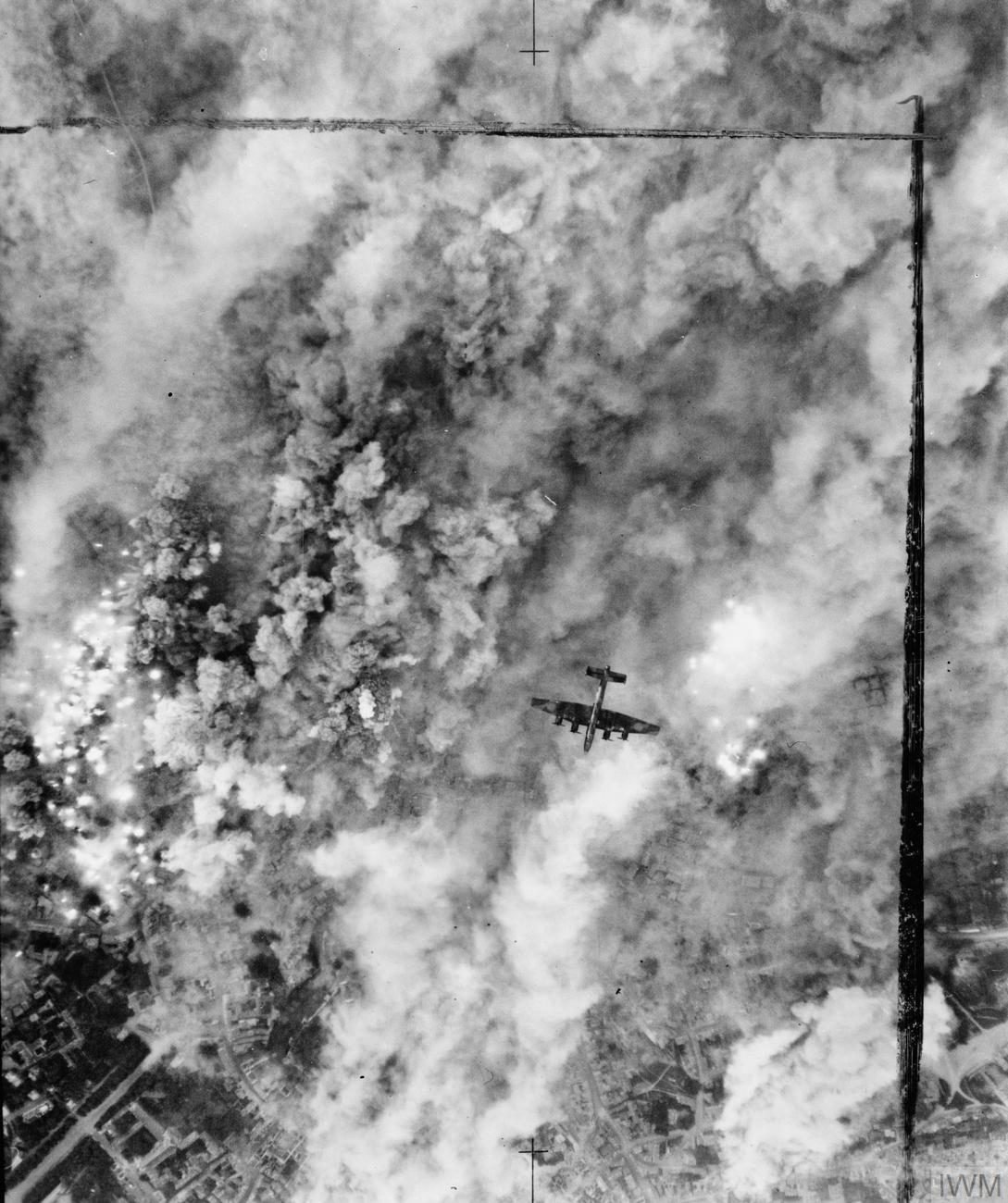
A Handley Page Halifax bomber of No. 4 Group RAF over northern Caen after the bombing of 7 July

On the night of 7 July 467 Lancaster and Halifax aircraft of RAF Bomber Command attacked Caen, dropping over 2,000 long tons (2,000 t) of bombs on the city. (Note: The quantity of munitions dropped on Caen is subject to some degree of dispute. Keegan estimates the tonnage at 2,000 long tons (2,000 t), while Cawthorne puts the figure at 2,300 long tons (2,300 t). D'Este wrote that "Bomber Command dropped some 6,000 bombs in a narrow area of northern Caen". Simon Trew wrote of 2,562 long tons (2,603 t).) Although intended mainly to facilitate the Anglo-Canadian advance and to prevent German reinforcements from reaching the battle or retreating through Caen, a secondary consideration was the suppression of the German defences. In this the bombing largely failed, the main German armour and infantry positions to the north of Caen remained intact. Several tanks were hit and temporarily disabled but only two Panzer IV of the 12th SS Panzer Division were destroyed. General Miles Dempsey, in command of the British Second Army, was more concerned with the morale-boosting effect of the bombing on his troops, than any material losses it might inflict on the Germans.

The pathfinders of 625 Squadron, dropping the target markers for the bombers, were instructed not to allow the target zone to "drift back" towards the Allied lines as had been the tendency in earlier operations. Together with the cautious shifting of the target zone during the planning stage, many of the markers were dropped too far forward, pushing the bombed zone well into Caen, further away from the German defences. By 22:00 on 7 July, the bombers had departed, leaving 80 per cent of the north of Caen destroyed. Caen University was particularly hard hit, starting chemical fires that soon spread. At 22:50, six squadrons of de Havilland Mosquito bombers attacked individual targets and ten minutes later the 636 guns of the assaulting divisions opened fire, with the battleship HMS Rodney and other ships adding their support. The bombardment was intensified by the artillery of VIII Corps against the villages north of Caen, to eliminate German strong points before the infantry assault began.

== Battle ==
=== 8 July ===
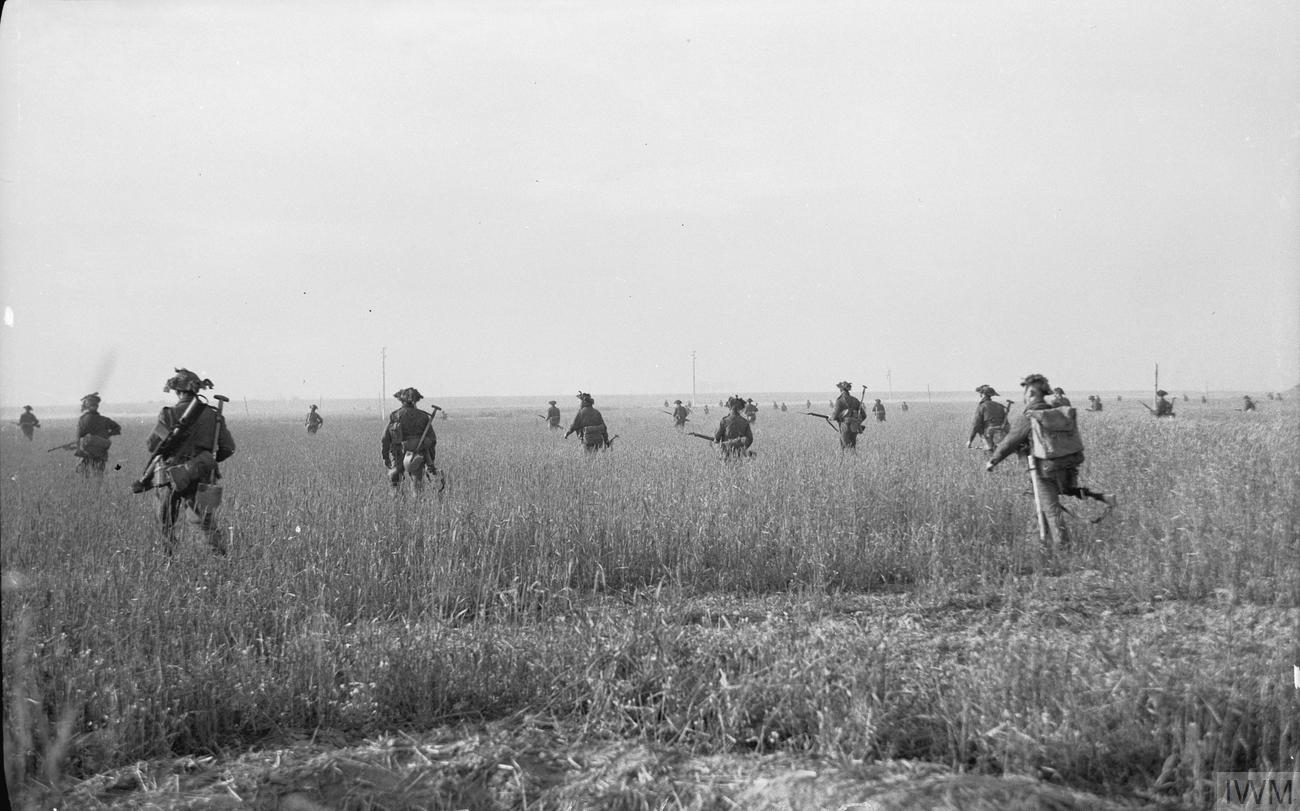
Men of the 2nd Battalion, Royal Warwickshire Regiment, of the 185th Brigade of the 3rd Infantry Division, advancing through a wheat field during the final assault on Caen.

At 04:30 on 8 July, the artillery of I and VIII Corps shifted their fire deeper into the German defensive belt, along the axes of advance of the 3rd Canadian Division and the 59th (Staffordshire) Infantry Division. As the infantry and armour moved off their start-lines, the barrage slowly crept forward, concentrating its fire on positions in front of the Anglo-Canadian troops; four battalions and two armoured regiments advancing on a two brigade front. At 07:00, 192 Marauder medium bombers arrived over the battlefield but finding it obscured by cloud only 87 aircraft were able to drop their bombs, totalling 133 long tons (135 t). Some bombs landed on the 12th SS Headquarters at Abbaye-aux-Dames.

Crocker launched the second phase of Operation Charnwood at 07:30, although neither division had yet reached its objectives. The 26th SS Panzergrenadier Regiment was still in control of high ground around the Carpiquet airfield on the right flank of the advance. On the left, facing the relatively weak defences of the 16th Luftwaffe Field Division, the 3rd Infantry Division made good progress. They attacked Lébisey and rapidly pushed through the village, although fighting intensified as the division reached Hérouville. Concerned about the state of the Luftwaffe division, General Heinrich Eberbach, in command of Panzer Group West ordered the 21st Panzer Division to redeploy north-east of Caen in support. The manoeuvre was spotted and when 21st Panzer attempted to cross the Caen Canal, a naval bombardment was directed against them. Facing the possibility of heavy losses, the move was abandoned. In the centre, the 176th Brigade of the 59th Division was encountering much stiffer resistance from the 12th SS Panzer Regiment in Galmanche and la Bijude. The 197th Brigade bypassed Galmanche and by noon had reached St-Contest.

Further to the west, the 9th Infantry Brigade of the 3rd Canadian Division had been involved in heavy fighting in Buron, which was defended by 200 men from the 12th SS. With support from the 10th Armoured Regiment (The Fort Garry Horse), by noon Buron had been taken, although the Canadian assault companies suffered 60% casualties. South of Buron, a counter-attack by Panzer IV and Panther tanks of the 12th SS Panzer Regiment was defeated by 17pdr SP Achilles self-propelled anti-tank guns and 17-pounder anti tank guns of the 245th Battery, 62nd Antitank Regiment. Thirteen German tanks were destroyed in one of the most successful antitank engagements of the campaign, for the loss of four tank destroyers and a further four damaged. Gruchy was captured with relatively less difficulty, with the 7th Canadian Infantry Brigade encountering only mortar and artillery fire in their drive to Authie. The capture of Authie facilitated the 59th Infantry Division assault on St-Contest and that village fell too, clearing the way for an advance on Caen. In Phase 3 of the operation, the 7th Brigade pushed towards the former headquarters of the 12th SS Panzer Division at Ardenne Abbey, securing the position before midnight.

The British 3rd Division brushed aside 16th Luftwaffe and approached the outskirts of Caen from the north-east. At 19:15, Meyer and Eberbach authorised the withdrawal of the 12th SS Panzer Division heavy weapons and the remnants of the Luftwaffe division across the Orne to the southern side of Caen. In the early evening, the 12th SS fought a rearguard action against elements of the 59th and 3rd Canadian divisions, as it pulled back from positions no longer considered tenable. Reports of this withdrawal came into the Anglo-Canadian command but patrols probing German positions, created a false perception that no withdrawal was taking place.

=== 9 July ===
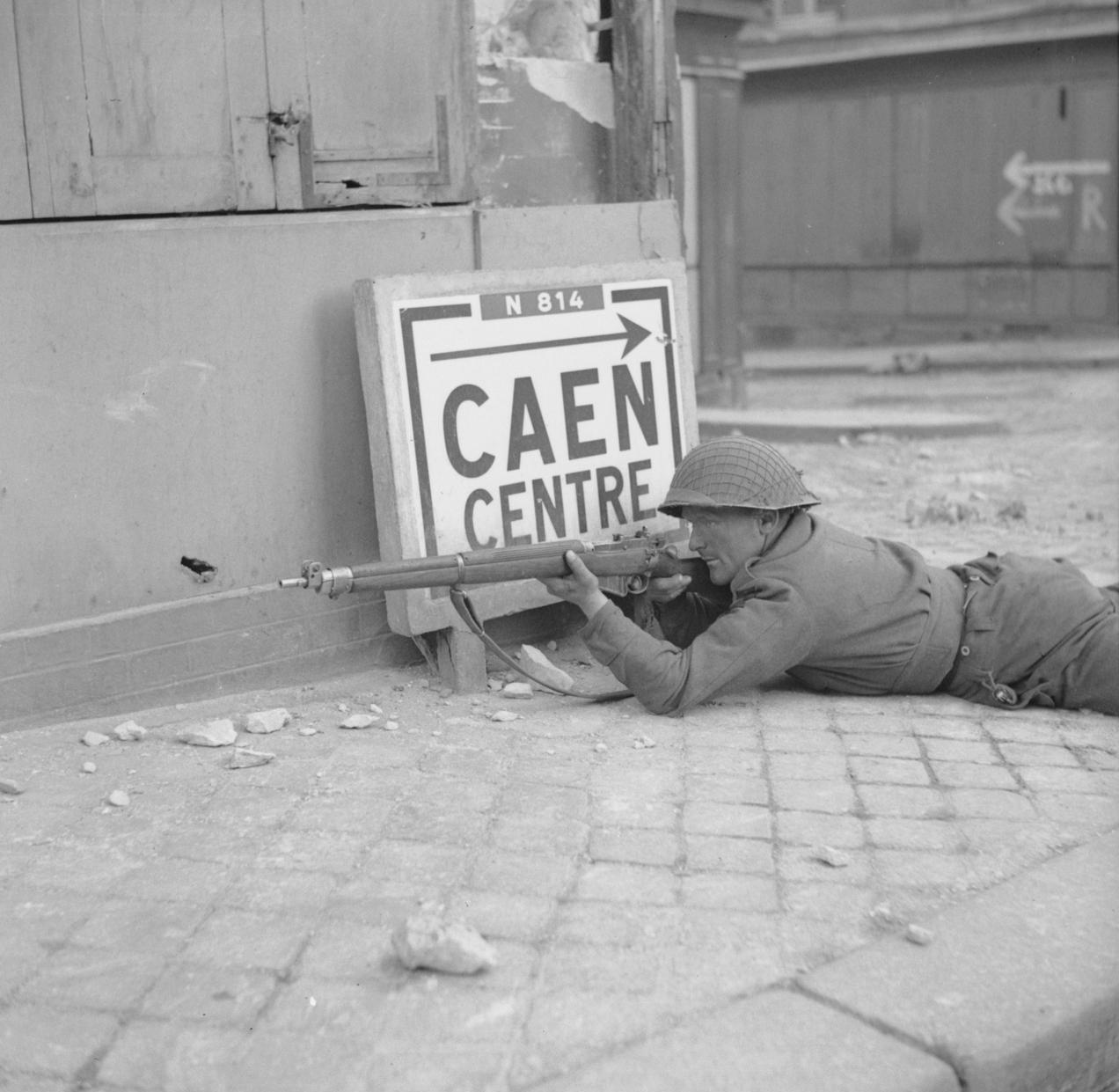
A soldier from I Corps takes cover in the streets of Caen during Operation Charnwood

British and Canadian patrols began to infiltrate the city at dawn on 9 July. The airfield at Carpiquet was captured during the early morning, when the 3rd Canadian Infantry Division discovered that the 26th SS Panzergrenadier Regiment had withdrawn during the night. With the German situation north of the river deteriorating, 21st Panzer Division battle groups and the remaining regiments of the 12th SS Panzer Division conducted a slow withdrawal across the Orne, making for the Verrières and Bourguébus Ridges.

By noon the 3rd British Infantry Division had reached the north bank of the Orne, virtually destroying the elements of the 16th Luftwaffe Field Division, west of the Orne, in the process. (Note: These elements were reported to have suffered 75 per cent losses.) A few hours later the British and Canadians met in the centre of the city and by 18:00 the northern half of Caen was firmly under Allied control; the objectives of I Corps had been achieved. A few bridges in the city were intact but these were either blocked by rubble or defended by German troops on the south bank and the 1st SS Panzer Division was placed to oppose any further advance.

The 12th SS Panzer Division (whose infantry strength had been reduced to that of a battalion by the end of Charnwood)—claimed in two days to have destroyed 103 British and Canadian tanks for the loss of 20. On entering Caen the Anglo–Canadians found it in ruins, with four-fifths of the Old City reduced to rubble by the 7 July bombings. The debris that choked the streets made it almost impossible for British armour to manoeuvre through the northern half of the city, preventing the Second Army from exploiting the I Corps victory. Without the terrain flanking the south of the city, no further gains could be made within Caen By mid-afternoon on 9 July, Operation Charnwood was over.

== Aftermath ==
=== Analysis ===
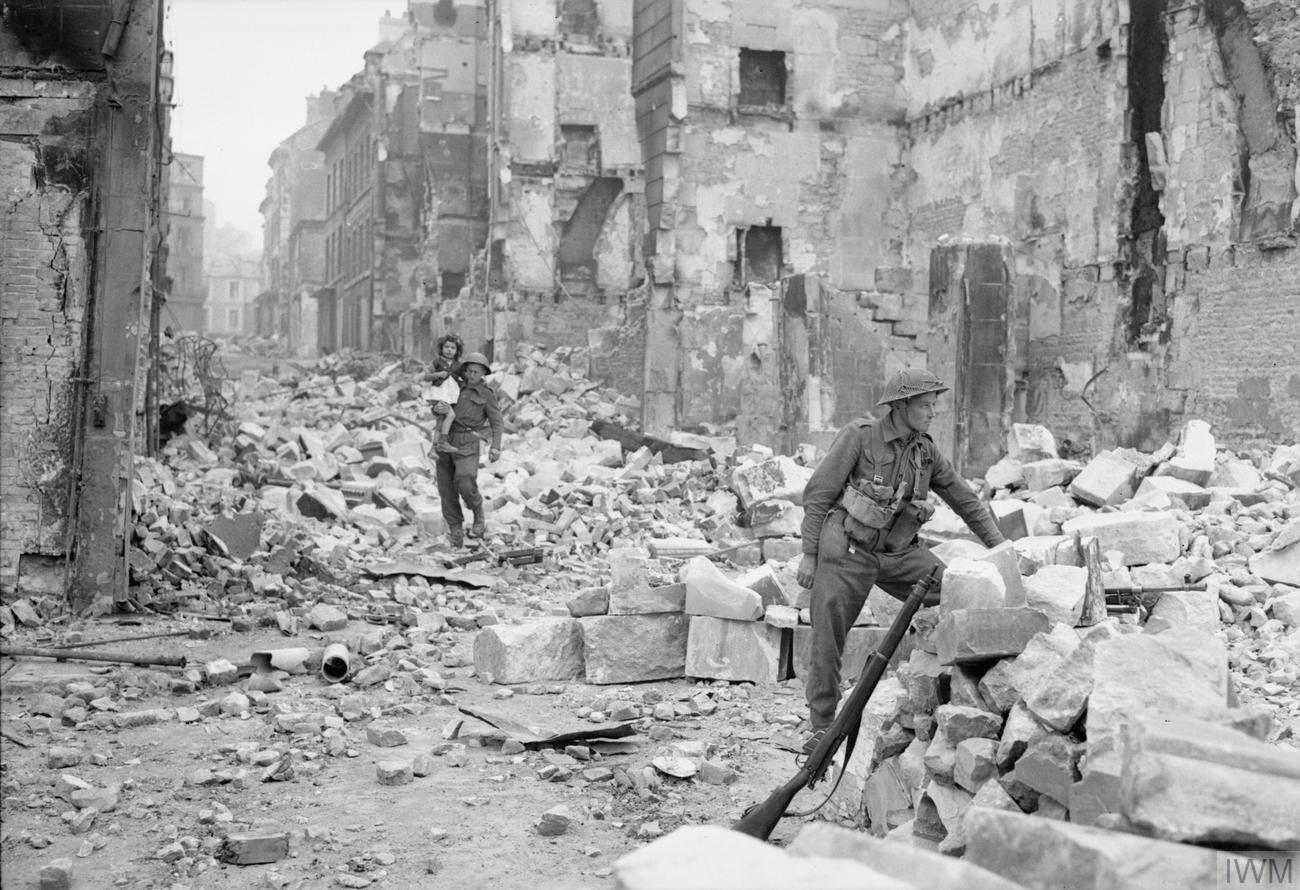
A British soldier carries a little girl through the devastation of Caen, 10 July 1944.

The Germans were forced to withdraw south of the Orne but Allied forces were unable to push beyond the river. German forces were dug-in on the south bank, blocking an advance to the south. Montgomery called off an advance beyond the Orne as further attacks would be too costly for the gains made, which had inflicted much attrition on the defenders. For French public opinion the operation was a coup; civilians now believed the liberation of France had begun.

Antony Beevor called Operation Charnwood a partial success, because although much of Caen was taken, the British and Canadians failed to secure enough ground to expand the Allied build-up; the bulk of the First Canadian Army was still waiting in the United Kingdom for transfer to Normandy. Carlo D'Este wrote that Charnwood did improve the Second Army's position but without the high ground to the south, Caen was useless, the capture of the city was too little too late and a hollow victory. Chester Wilmot wrote that for Montgomery to maintain a threat to German-occupied Paris, Caen's southern suburbs with their factories and communications network would have been a more significant prize. John Buckley and Terry Copp noted that by the time the city was captured, the Germans—weakened by the battles of late June and early July—had already established defensive positions on the high ground to the south of the Orne, which blocked the route to the Falaise plain

Copp wrote that the British Second Army won an important operational victory during Charnwood and the Society for Army Historical Research recorded that the attacks were a tactical and operational success. The Supreme Allied Commander, General Dwight D. Eisenhower expressed concern that a break-out was unlikely. Montgomery differed; the tenacity of the German defence was no barometer of its longevity. Field Marshal Erwin Rommel mentioned to Lieutenant-Colonel Caesar von Hofacker that the front line in France could only be held for another three weeks. Hofacker was a member of the German resistance and linked with the Hitler assassination plot and according to Trew, Rommel's comment led to the plot timetable being decided.

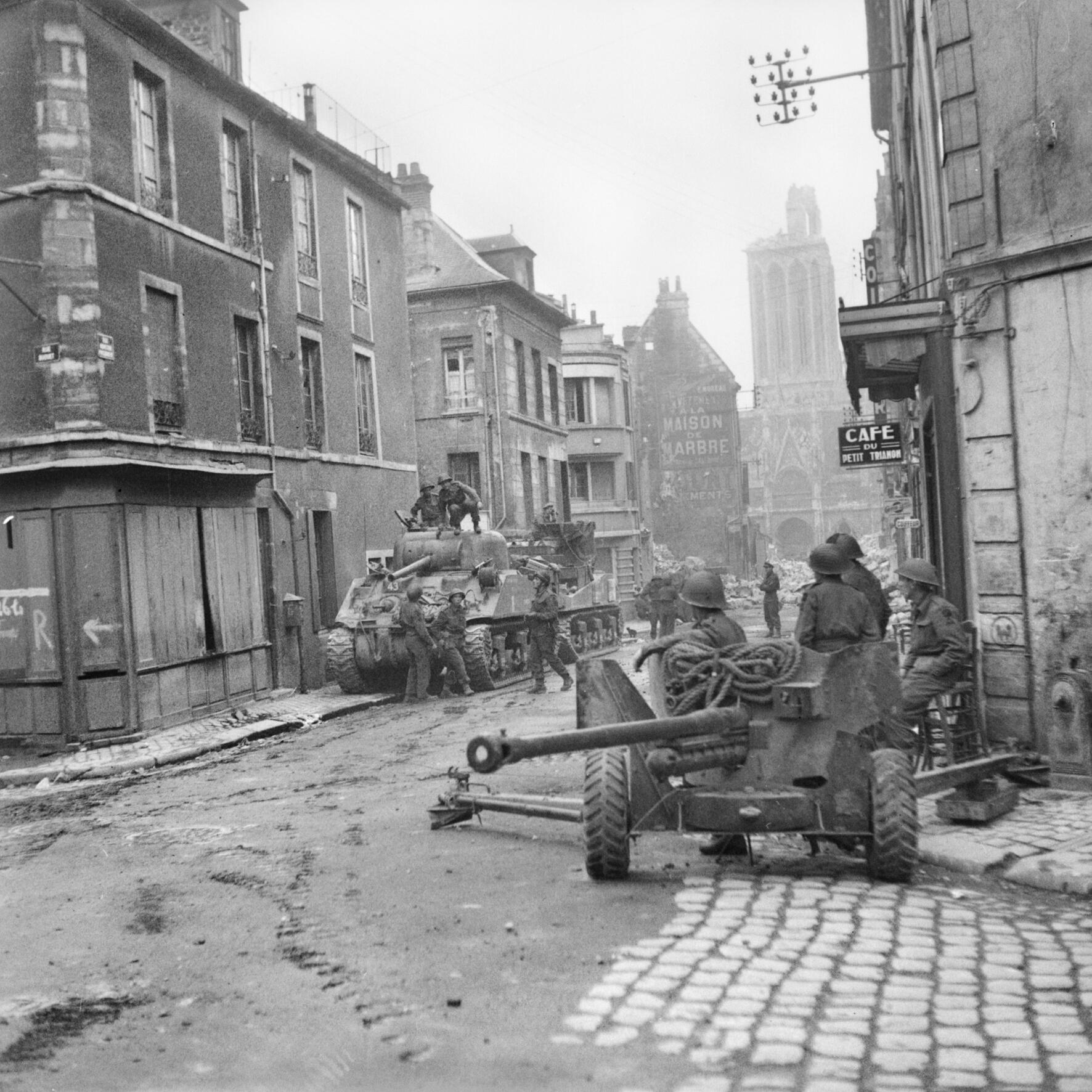
A 6-pounder anti-tank gun of the 1st Battalion, King's Own Scottish Borderers, part of the 9th Infantry Brigade of the British 3rd Division, along with two Sherman tanks near St-Pierre Church, 10 July 1944.

The cost of maintaining a static defence during June led to divisions in the German high command. On 1 July, the Panzer Group West commander, Leo Geyr von Schweppenburg, had been replaced by Heinrich Eberbach, following disagreements with Hitler over how the campaign should be conducted. Gerd von Rundstedt soon followed; that evening, in a telephone conversation with Generalfeldmarschall Wilhelm Keitel, head of OKW, Rundstedt said "Make peace, you fools". Taken to task over his endorsement of Schweppenburg's recommendation for a withdrawal, he replied "If you doubt what we're doing, get up here and take over this shambles yourself". The following morning, informed that perhaps his health was "no longer up to the task", Rundstedt resigned and was succeeded as OB West by Günther von Kluge. The costly battles in and around Caen and Saint-Lô convinced Eberbach and Kluge that their predecessors had been correct. The Germans had suffered severely, leading Hitler to order Army Group B temporarily to abandon big counter-attacks and stay on the defensive until more reinforcements could arrive.

Trew contends that the capture of northern Caen had a psychological impact on the French population, convincing them the Allies were there to stay and that the liberation of France could not be far off. By the end of Charnwood, Allied casualties since 6 June had risen to 30,000 men, excluding those who had been evacuated due to sickness and from battle exhaustion. Buckley believes Charnwood to have been a good idea but one that proved better in concept than in execution, influenced as it was by the mounting political pressure on 21st Army Group to produce results. Copp wrote that the broad front attack had worked, preventing the Germans bringing to bear superior firepower on any one formation.

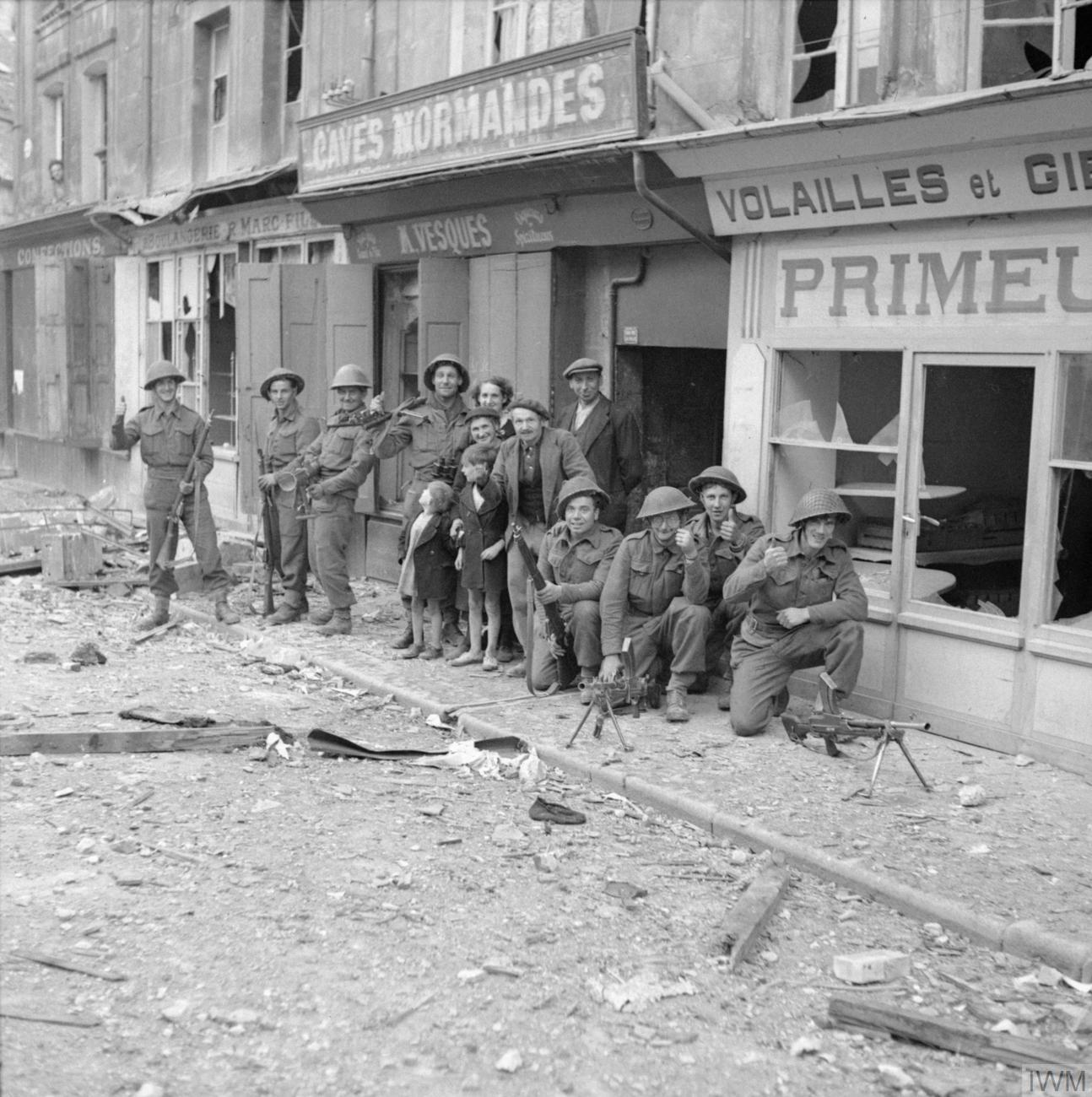
Some of the first troops to enter Caen pose with local inhabitants outside wrecked shops, 9 July 1944.

Copp wrote that Charnwood should have produced a rapid breakthrough but concedes that the battle was one of the most difficult of the campaign. Buckley singles out poor cooperation between armoured and infantry units as one of the reasons for such high Allied losses; he is critical of the habit of tanks standing off from German positions and firing the infantry onto the objective like artillery, instead of moving forward to give close support. From the German perspective, the Anglo–Canadian forces apparently lacked the desire or ability to press home their advantages, citing Kurt Meyer's opinion that during the battle the Allies allowed the opportunity to destroy the 12th SS Panzer Division to elude them. Buckley comments on the defensive power of the British and Canadian formations. The German practice of conducting immediate local counter-attacks to retake lost ground cost them many of their best troops, losses they could ill-afford. He illustrates this with a typical action during which the Germans lost 13 tanks to British self-propelled anti-tank guns.

With Caen north of the River Orne in Allied hands, mine-clearance operations began, bulldozers were set to work to clear the streets and a convoy of trucks carrying supplies for the civilian population was brought in. On 10 July, the French flag was raised over the city and three days later a parade was held in the Place Saint-Martin during which a second flag was raised to the strains of Scottish bagpipers playing La Marseillaise.

Rommel and Eberbach consolidated defensive positions in and around southern Caen, the 1st SS Panzer Division, 9th SS Panzer Division and 12th SS Panzer Division turned the Bourguébus/Verrières Ridge into a formidable barrier. Having committed all of his armoured reserves, Rommel transferred the remainder of his infantry divisions—the 708th Infantry Division, 276th Infantry Division, 277th Infantry Division and 272nd Infantry Division—to the Anglo–Canadian front. On 8 July, he released the remnants of the Panzer Lehr Division and the 2nd SS Panzer Division Das Reich to the American sector. At the start of the campaign, Panzer-Lehr was one of the most powerful armoured formations in the German army, by this stage it had been reduced to a number of battle groups and was no longer operational as a division. On 17 July, Rommel's staff car was strafed by British fighters, severely injuring the Field Marshal and confining him to hospital. Two days later Rommel was replaced as Army Group B commander by Field Marshal Günther von Kluge. Rommel never returned to Normandy; implicated in the 20 July plot against Hitler, on 14 October he was forced to commit suicide.

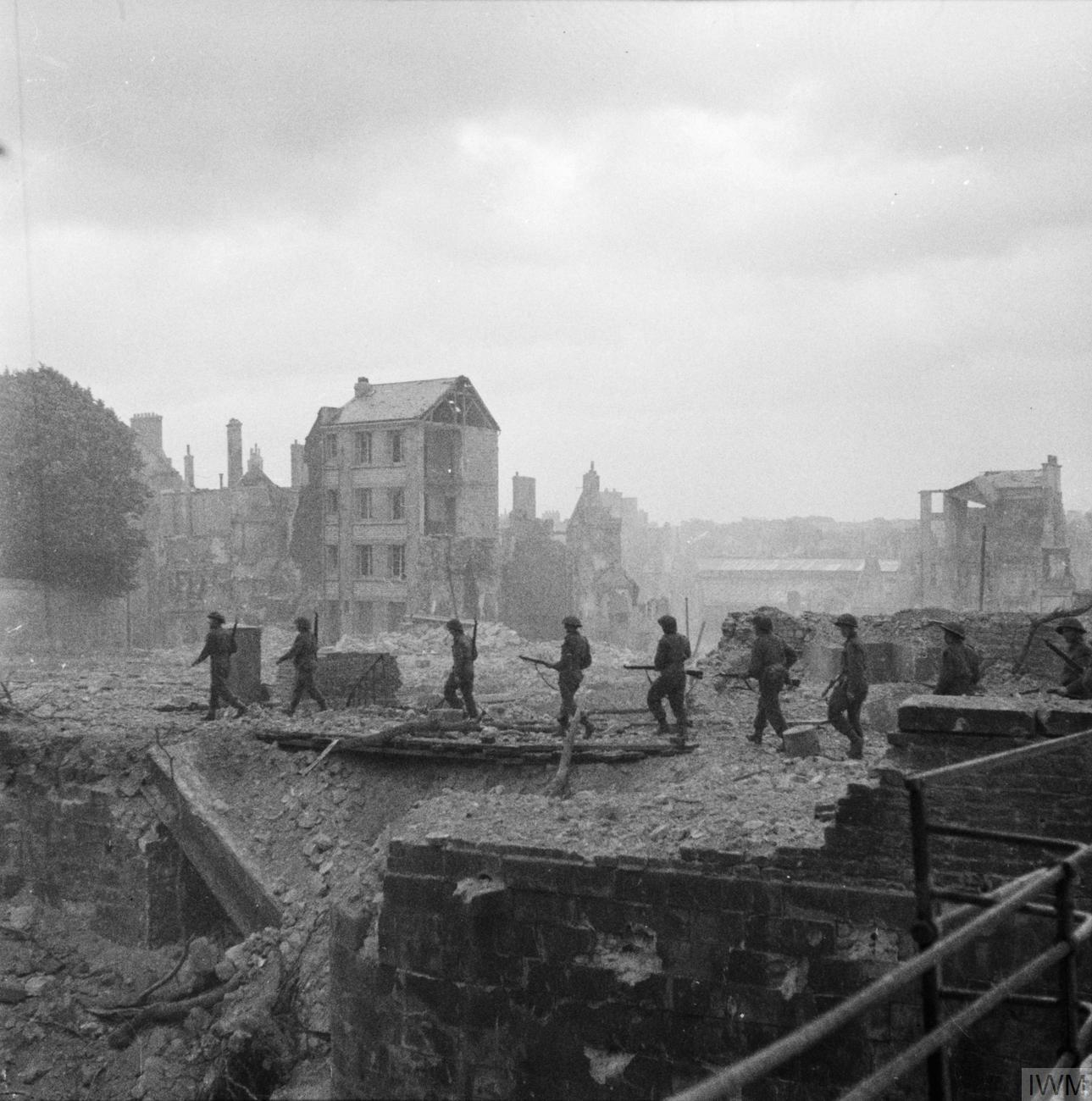
Royal Engineers move through the ruins of Caen, looking for mines and booby-traps, 10 July 1944.

Caen's partial capture allowed General Omar Bradley, commander of the First US Army, to accelerate his plans for a break-out. Shortly after Charnwood the VII US Corps attacked German positions in Saint-Lô, which the 2nd SS Panzer Division had been ordered to "hold at all costs". On 18 July, after eight days of fighting during which 95 per cent of the town was destroyed and VII Corps had more than 5,000 casualties, Saint-Lô was captured.

The same day, the Second Army began Operation Goodwood with 1,100–1,300 tanks in the largest armoured battle in British military history. VIII Corps (Lieutenant-General Richard O'Connor) spearheaded the drive towards the Bourguébus Ridge with three armoured divisions, supported by I Corps. After a preliminary attack by 1,056 heavy bombers, elements of the 11th Armoured Division, Guards Armoured Division and 7th Armoured Division assaulted the positions of LXXXVI Corps north of Bourguébus but despite early gains of around 12,000 yd (6.8 mi; 11 km), strong resistance prevented VIII Corps taking the ridge. Simultaneously the new II Canadian Corps (Lieutenant General Guy Simonds) launched Operation Atlantic an offensive on Caen north of the Orne. The II Canadian Corps ran into fierce opposition; during the later Battle of Verrières Ridge the Canadians sustained 2,800 casualties. Verrières Ridge would remain in German hands until 8 August.

=== Battle honours ===
The British and Commonwealth system of battle honours recognises the battle by the award to 55 units of the honour Caen, for participation in the capture of Caen between 4–18 July 1944. Awarded from 1956 to 1959, the recognition was accompanied by honours for taking part in Operation Charnwood. For participating in the capture of Caen between 8–9 July three units were awarded the honour Orne, nine the honour The Orne, and two the honour The Orne (Buron).

=== Bombing ===
Hastings wrote that the bombing came to be seen by many as "one of the most futile air attacks of the war" and Beevor called the attack a "disaster". Reynolds judged the results of the bombing as "pathetic" and D'Este wrote that the bombing hindered the Allied push into the city. Air Commodore E. J. Kingston-McCloughry and Solly Zuckerman conducted a survey and concluded that no targets of military value had been attacked, nor were there any gun positions, tanks or German dead in the target zone. They interviewed men of the 3rd Infantry Division, who were reportedly bewildered as to why the bombers had been employed. Norman Scarfe, the 3rd Division historian, wrote that in the wake of the air-raid the men

... for the first time for weeks breathed freely. The full support of the Air Force gave them full hearts ... and the men were encouraged.

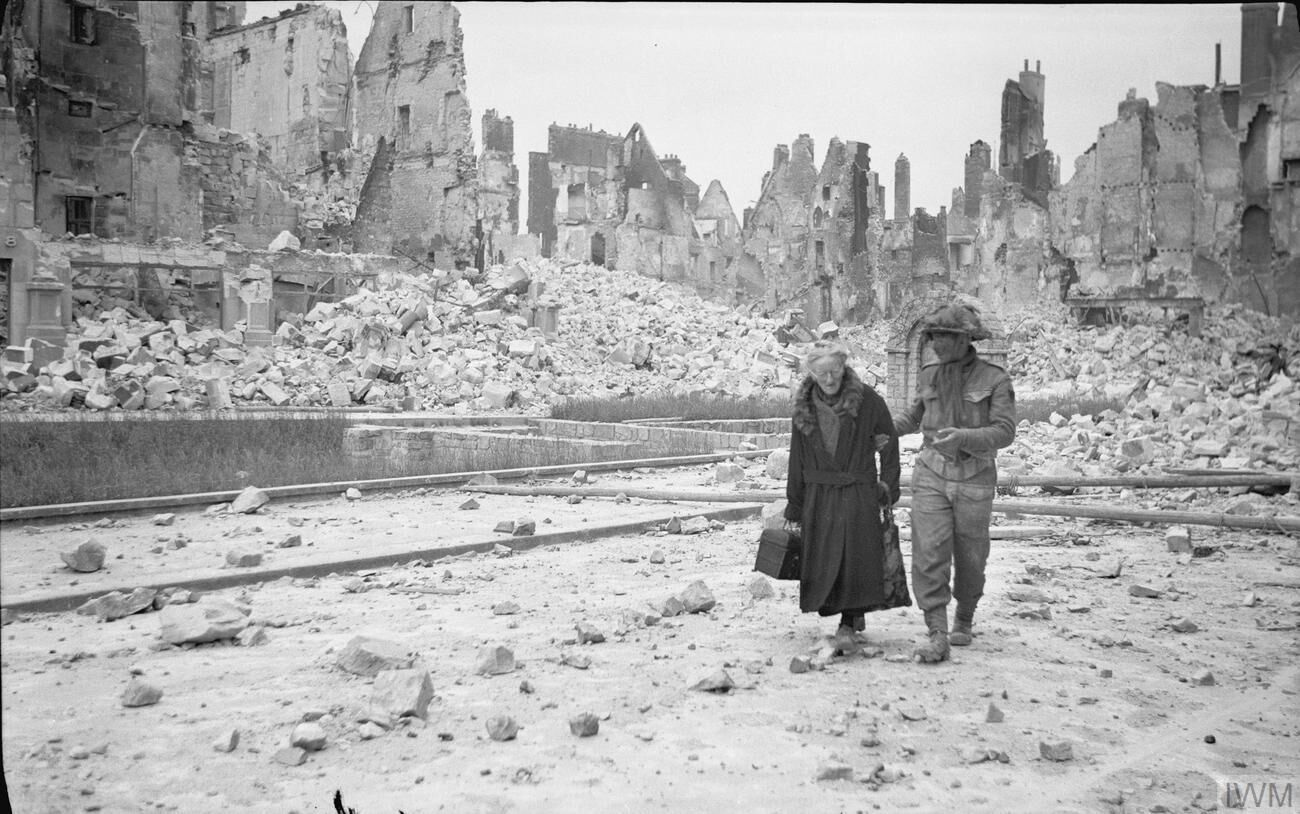
A British soldier helps an old woman through the ruins of Caen after its capture.

The Canadian Official Historian, C. P. Stacey wrote that several Canadian formations reported an increase in morale. Wilmot wrote that the bombing was essential because it raised the morale of the Second Army and depressed that of the German defenders. A 21st Army Group intelligence report, based on the interrogation of German prisoners recorded that the raid was "decisive" and had apparently destroyed the headquarters of the Luftwaffe infantry regiment based north of Caen and deprived the German troops north of the city of ammunition and rations the following morning. Gray wrote that the bombing had an effect on the morale of both sides but that this was temporary. Lionel Ellis, the British Official Historian, Simon Trew and Badsey all wrote that the raid was intended to cut off German reinforcements from the battlefield and hinder an attempt to withdraw south of the Orne river. Stacey wrote that it was "obvious and desirable" that for maximum advantage, the Allied ground forces should have advanced on the heels of the attack. Gray concluded that no-one "can[not] satisfactorily answer the question 'why'" the city was bombed.

Analysis by Operational Research Section 2 (ORS2) concluded that the bombing of the first aiming point north-west of Caen was accurate, finding that the centre of the 90 per cent zone (the area where 90 per cent of the bombs fell) was 200–300 yd (180–270 m) east of the aiming point, with some spillage to the south and west. Examination of the area, after its capture, indicated some destruction of German equipment, including the wreckage of ten of the forty trucks believed to be in the area at the time of the raid. The 48 hours that elapsed between the bombing and the Allied occupation of the area, allowed the Germans time to recover from any shock and disorientation and to salvage some damaged equipment. Examination of the second aiming point, "Northern Caen", failed to reveal a 90 per cent zone but it was noted that the obstructive effect of bombing a suburb was significant and had caused substantial delays to vehicles of both sides by cratering and blocking roads. ORS2 concluded that the success of Charnwood owed little to the bombing and made recommendations including changing to instantly fused bombs, dropping larger numbers of smaller anti-personnel bombs and rapidly following-up a bombardment with ground forces to take advantage of its main effect, which was the temporary suppression of German will to resist. In Operation Goodwood, Operation Bluecoat, Operation Cobra, Operation Totalize and Operation Tractable the 21st Army Group exploited better the effect of preparatory attacks by strategic bombers by following-up the attacks immediately.

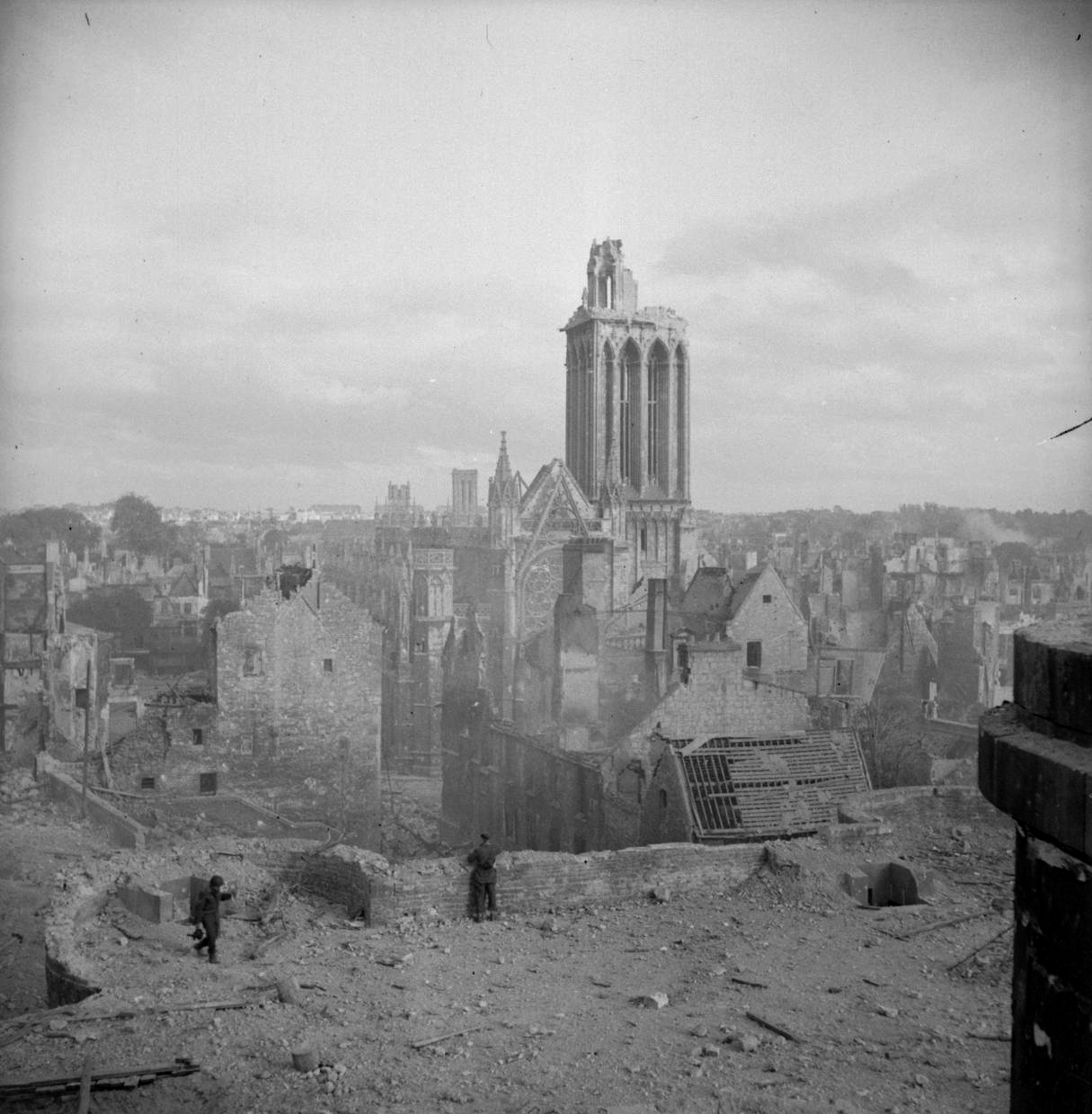
The aftermath of the bombing of Caen on 7 July 1944.

The British initially announced that around 6,000 civilians had been killed during the air-raid and a Soviet war correspondent attached to the 21st Army Group, Lieutenant-Colonel Kraminov, put the figure as high as 22,000, a claim that was used by French communists in post-war anti-British propaganda. It was later found that 300–400 civilians were killed in the raid. Caen citizens were relieved and provided their liberators with a welcome that the troops found very moving; French accounts of the time claim that "All [of] Caen was in the streets to greet them". Although Ellis called the French welcome "pathetic", no Allied unit recorded any complaints about the reception they were given. Stacey wrote that the populace were "particularly delighted to find their city freed in part by men from Canada". Beevor wrote that most of the population were numb from the shock and quoted a British soldier who recalled that "most ... women were crying, grief-stricken and anguished". As early as 12 June, the French Resistance had sent messengers to the British, informing them that refugees were gathering in the areas around the Abbaye-aux-Hommes and the Hôpital du Bon Sauveur and requested that these locations not to be bombed; British assurances were given and these locations were nearly untouched. Gray wrote that after the war, the city population regarded itself as being martyred, which could be seen on the war memorial.

== Subsequent operations ==
=== Operation Jupiter ===
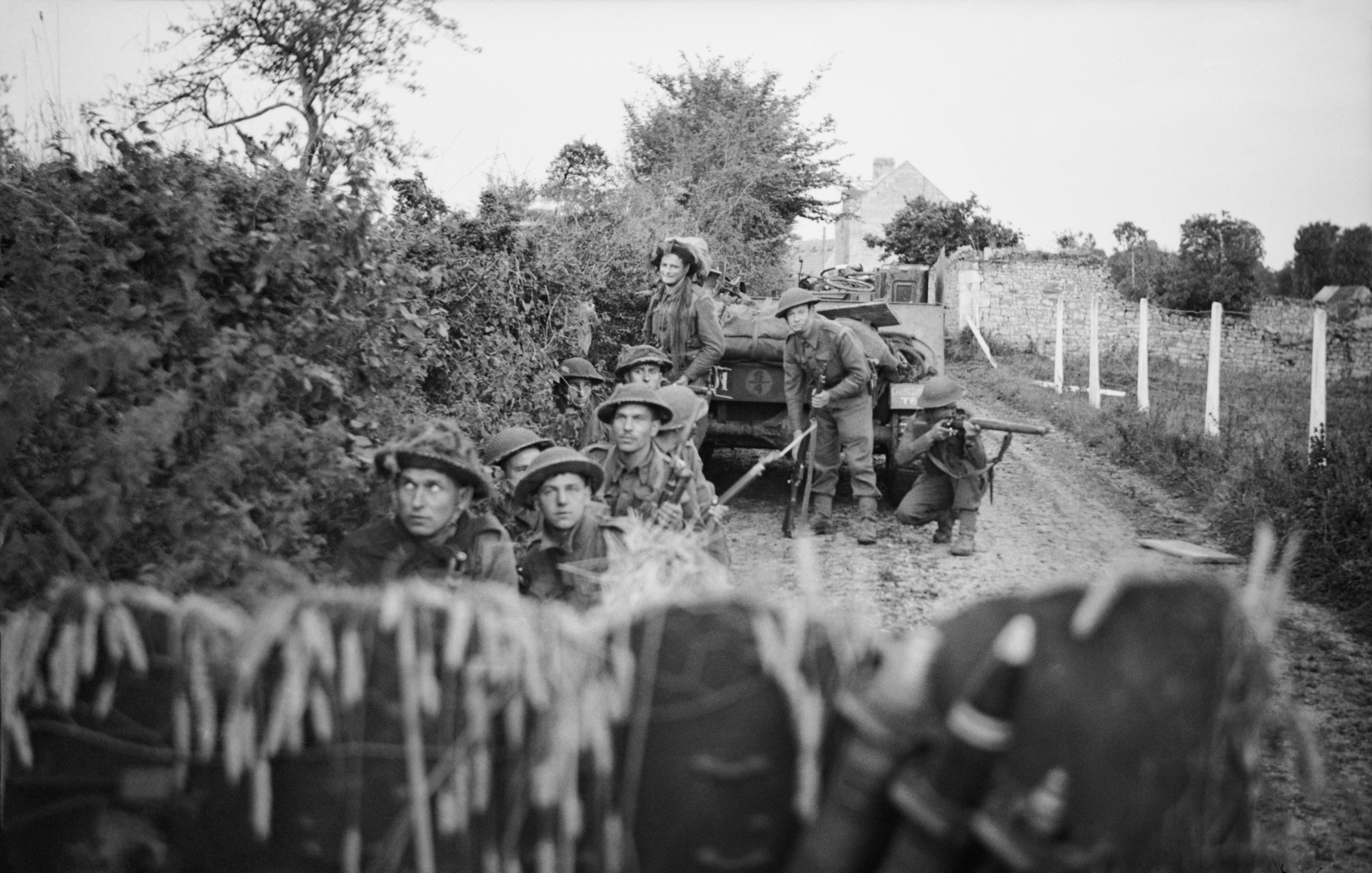
Soldiers of the 43rd (Wessex) Infantry Division take cover from German mortar fire during Jupiter

On 10 July, the 43rd (Wessex) Infantry Division attacked the positions of the 10th SS Panzer Division to the southwest of Caen on Hill 112. Preceded by a two-day bombardment that included support from naval vessels and Typhoon fighter-bombers, the assault was designed to threaten Caen from the west and push back the 10th SS Panzer Division, securing an avenue of attack. The 43rd (Wessex) Division attacked at dawn on 10 July, supported by two armoured brigades. By 08:00, British tanks and infantry were engaged with the 10th SS Panzer and "well up" the slopes of Hill 112. Eterville was taken around mid-morning; as the 4th Armoured Brigade and 43rd (Wessex) Division pressed their attack, the Panzer Group West commander, General Heinrich Eberbach, insisted that "Hill 112 is the pivotal point of the whole position West of Caen, and must therefore be held".

The 102nd SS Heavy Panzer Battalion and the 1st SS Panzer Division were committed to its defence. The 4th Armoured Brigade reached the summit but in the evening were counter-attacked by remnants of the 1st SS Panzer Division and the 12th SS Panzer Division. The British offensive resumed the following day with the support of anti-tank regiments from the Second Army; these had severe losses in a counter-attack by the 102nd SS Heavy Panzer Battalion. Hill 112 was briefly taken by a battalion of the Duke of Cornwall's Light Infantry, only to be lost to further German counter-attacks in the late afternoon. By the evening of 11 July, with both sides exhausted and having suffered severely the offensive had reached a stalemate. The 43rd (Wessex) Infantry Division and its supporting armour had suffered two thousand casualties in the two days of fighting.

== Bibliography ==
- Beevor, Antony (2009). D-Day: The Battle for Normandy. Viking. ISBN 978-0-670-88703-3.
- Buckley, John (2006) [2004]. British Armour in the Normandy Campaign 1944. Taylor & Francis. ISBN 978-0-415-40773-1.
- Buckley, John, ed. (2007) [2006]. The Normandy Campaign 1944: Sixty Years on. Routledge. ISBN 978-0-415-44942-7.
- Cawthorne, Nigel (2005). Victory in World War II. London: Capella. ISBN 978-1-84193-351-1.
- Cirillo, Roger (2001). The Market Garden Campaign: Allied Operational Command in Northwest Europe, 1944 (PhD). Cranfield University: College of Defence Technology, Department of Defence Management and Security Analysis. OCLC 59172331.
- Clark, Lloyd (2004). Operation Epsom. Battle Zone Normandy. The History Press. ISBN 978-0-7509-3008-6.
- Clay, Major Ewart W. (1950). The Path of the 50th: The story of the 50th (Northumbrian) Division in the Second World War. Aldershot: Gale and Polden. OCLC 12049041.
- Copp, Terry, ed. (2000). Montgomery's Scientists: Operational Research in Northwest Europe. The work of No.2 Operational Research Section with 21 Army Group June 1944 to July 1945. Waterloo Ontario: LCMSDS. ISBN 978-0-9697955-9-9.
- Copp, Terry (2004) [2003]. Fields of Fire: The Canadians in Normandy. Toronto: University of Toronto Press. ISBN 978-0-8020-3780-0.
- Copp, Terry (2004). A Nation at War, 1939–1945: Essays from Legion Magazine. Waterloo, Ontario: Laurier Centre for Military, Strategic and Disarmament Studies. ISBN 978-0-96887-505-6.
- Daglish, Ian (2005). Operation Goodwood. Over the Battlefield. Barnsley: Pen & Sword. ISBN 978-1-84415-153-0.
- Delaney, Douglas (2007). "A Quiet Man of Influence: General Sir John Crocker". J. Soc. Army. Hist. Res. 85 (343): 185–207. ISSN 0037-9700. JSTOR 44231490.
- Ellis, Lionel; Allen, G. R. G.; Warhurst, A. E. & Robb, James (2004) [1962]. Butler, J. R. M. (ed.). Victory in the West: The Battle of Normandy. History of the Second World War United Kingdom Military Series. Vol. I (Naval & Military Press, Uckfield ed.). London: HMSO. ISBN 978-1-84574-058-0.
- D'Este, Carlo (2004) [1983]. Decision in Normandy: The Real Story of Montgomery and the Allied Campaign. London: Penguin. ISBN 978-0-14-101761-7.
- Ford, Ken; Gerrard (Illustrator), Howard (2002). Gold and Juno Beaches. D-Day 1944. Osprey. ISBN 978-1-84176-368-2.
- Forty, George (2004). Villers Bocage. Battle Zone Normandy. Sutton Publishing. ISBN 978-0-7509-3012-3.
- Hart, Stephen Ashley (2007) [2000]. Colossal Cracks: Montgomery's 21st Army Group in Northwest Europe, 1944–45. Mechanicsburg: Stackpole Books. ISBN 978-0-8117-3383-0.
- Hastings, Max (2006) [1985]. Overlord: D-Day and the Battle for Normandy (repr. ed.). New York: Vintage Books USA. ISBN 978-0-307-27571-4.
- How, Major J. J. (2004) [1984]. Hill 112: Cornerstone of the Normandy Campaign. Winnipeg, Canada: J.J. Fedorowicz Publishing. ISBN 978-0-921991-81-6.
- Jackson, G. S. (2006) [1945]. 8 Corps: Normandy to the Baltic. Smalldale: MLRS Books. ISBN 978-1-905696-25-3.
- Keegan, John (2004) [1982]. Six Armies in Normandy: From D-Day to the Liberation at Paris. London: Pimlico. ISBN 978-1-84413-739-8.
- Meyer, Hubert (2005) [1994]. The 12th SS: The History of the Hitler Youth Panzer Division. Vol. I. Mechanicsburg: Stackpole Books. ISBN 978-0-8117-3198-0.
- Meyer, Hubert (2005). The 12th SS: The History of the Hitler Youth Panzer Division. Vol. II. Mechanicsburg: Stackpole. ISBN 978-0-8117-3199-7.
- Reynolds, Michael (2001) [1997]. Steel Inferno: I SS Panzer Corps in Normandy. Da Capo Press. ISBN 978-1-885119-44-5.
- Reynolds, Michael (2002). Sons of the Reich: The History of II SS Panzer Corps in Normandy, Arnhem, the Ardennes and on the Eastern Front. Havertown: Casemate Publishers and Book Distributors. ISBN 978-0-9711709-3-3.
- Roy, Reginald H. (1984). 1944: The Canadians in Normandy. Toronto: Macmillan of Canada. ISBN 978-0-7715-9796-1.
- Scarfe, Norman (2006) [1947]. Assault Division: A History of the 3rd Division from the Invasion of Normandy to the Surrender of Germany. Stroud: Spellmount. ISBN 978-1-86227-338-2.
- Stacey, Colonel Charles Perry; Bond, Major C. C. J. (1960). The Victory Campaign: The Operations in North-West Europe 1944–1945. Official History of the Canadian Army in the Second World War. Vol. III. The Queen's Printer and Controller of Stationery Ottawa. OCLC 256471407.
- Swanston, Alexander; Swanston, Malcolm (2007). The Historical Atlas of World War II. London: Cartographica Press. ISBN 978-1-84573-240-0.
- Taylor, Daniel (1999). Villers-Bocage Through the Lens. Old Harlow: Battle of Britain International. ISBN 978-1-870067-07-2.
- Trew, Simon; Badsey, Stephen (2004). Battle for Caen. Battle Zone Normandy. Stroud: Sutton Publishing. ISBN 978-0-7509-3010-9.
- Van Der Vat, Dan (2003). D-Day; The Greatest Invasion, A People's History. Toronto: Madison Press. ISBN 978-1-55192-586-8.
- Williams, Andrew (2004). D-Day to Berlin. London: Hodder & Stoughton. ISBN 978-0-340-83397-1.
- Wilmot, Chester; Christopher Daniel McDevitt (1997) [1952]. The Struggle For Europe (pbk. facs. repr. ed.). Ware: Wordsworth Editions. ISBN 978-1-85326-677-5.
- Wood, James A. (2007). Army of the West: The Weekly Reports of German Army Group B from Normandy to the West Wall. Mechanicsburg: Stackpole Books. ISBN 978-0-8117-3404-2.
- Zuehlke, Mark (2001). The Canadian Military Atlas: Canada's Battlefields from the French and Indian Wars to Kosovo. Toronto and Niagara Falls, New York: Stoddart. ISBN 978-0-7737-3289-6.
