= Operation Goodwood =

British offensive in the Second World War

- Part of the Battle for Caen
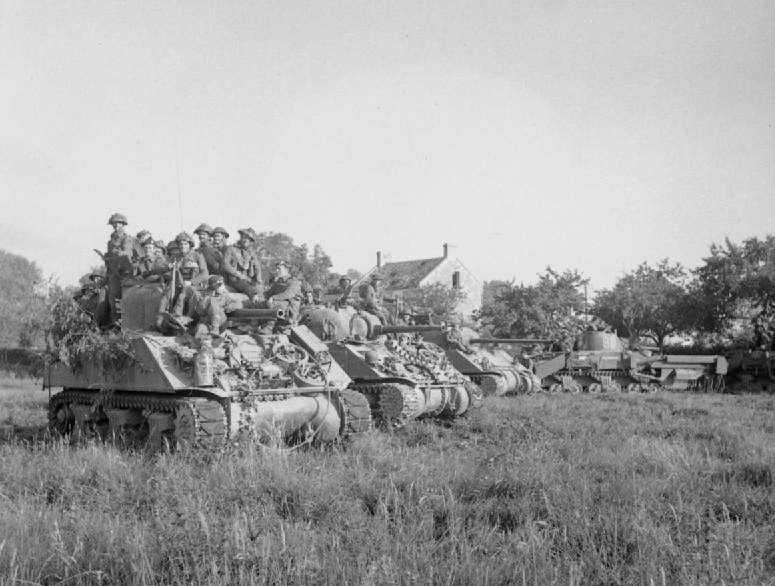
- Two M4 Sherman tanks, a Sherman Firefly carrying infantry and a Sherman Crab wait for the order to advance at the start of Operation Goodwood, 18 July
Date	18–20 July 1944
Location	Normandy, France 49°10′54″N 00°16′03″W
Result	See Aftermath section

Belligerents
United Kingdom	Germany

Commanders and leaders
Bernard Montgomery; Miles Dempsey; John Crocker; Richard O'Connor	Günther von Kluge; Heinrich Eberbach; Sepp Dietrich; Hans von Obstfelder

Strength
139,000 men 3 armoured divisions 1,369 tanks 732 guns 2 infantry divisions 1 armoured brigade	79,750 men 3 panzer divisions 2 heavy tank battalions 325 tanks 4 infantry divisions 291 guns 160 heavy A-T guns 56 Flak 88s 230 Nebelwerfer

Casualties and losses
3,474–5,000 men 400 tanks ( 253 knocked out)	6,500–7,000 casualties (incl. 2,000+ captured) (Note: German operational returns compiled by Niklas Zetterling indicate roughly 6,500–7,000 German personnel casualties across I. SS-Panzerkorps and adjacent flank formations during Operation Goodwood (18–20 July 1944), including over 2,000 prisoners captured on 18 July.); 75–100 tanks and assault guns lost

Operation Goodwood
- Operational scope: Offensive
- Planned by: Second Army
- Objective: See Aftermath section
- Executed by: Second Army, VIII Corps, supporting attacks by I Corps

Operation Goodwood was a British offensive during the Second World War, which took place between 18 and 20 July 1944 as part of the larger battle for Caen in Normandy, France. The objective of the operation was a limited attack to the south, from the Orne bridgehead, to capture the rest of Caen and the Bourguébus Ridge beyond.

Goodwood was preceded by Operations Greenline and Pomegranate in the Second Battle of the Odon west of Caen, to divert German attention from the area east of Caen. Goodwood began when the British VIII Corps, with three armoured divisions, attacked to seize the German-held Bourguébus Ridge, the area between Bretteville-sur-Laize and Vimont and to inflict maximum casualties on the Germans. On 18 July, the British I Corps conducted an attack to secure a series of villages to the east of VIII Corps; to the west, the II Canadian Corps launched Operation Atlantic, synchronised with Goodwood, to capture the Caen suburbs south of the Orne River. When the operation ended on 20 July, the armoured divisions had broken through the outer German defences and advanced 7 mi (11 km) but had been stopped short of Bourguébus Ridge, only armoured cars having penetrated further south and beyond the ridge.

While Goodwood failed in its primary aim, it forced the Germans to keep powerful formations opposite the British and Canadians on the eastern flank of the Normandy beachhead and Operation Cobra, the First US Army attack which began on 25 July, caused the weaker German defences opposite to collapse.

== Background ==
=== Caen ===
The historic Normandy town of Caen was a D-Day objective for the British 3rd Infantry Division, which landed on Sword Beach on 6 June 1944. The capture of Caen, while "ambitious", was called the most important D-Day objective assigned to I Corps (Lieutenant-General John Crocker). (Note: "The quick capture of that key city Caen and the neighbourhood of Carpiquet was the most ambitious, the most difficult and the most important task of Lieutenant-General J. T. Crocker's I Corps". Wilmot wrote that "The objectives given to Crocker's seaborne divisions were decidedly ambitious, since his troops were to land last, on the most exposed beaches, with the farthest to go, against what was potentially the greatest opposition". The Second Army (Lieutenant-General Miles Dempsey), always considered the possibility that the attack on Caen might fail.) Operation Overlord called for Second Army to secure the city and then form a front line from Caumont-l'Éventé–southeast of Caen, to acquire space for airfields and to protect the left flank of the First US Army (Lieutenant General Omar N. Bradley), while it moved on Cherbourg. Possession of Caen and its surroundings would give the Second Army a staging area for a push south to capture Falaise, which could be used as the pivot for a swing left, to advance on Argentan and then towards the Touques River. The terrain between Caen and Vimont was especially promising, being open, dry and conducive to mobile operations. Since the Allied forces greatly outnumbered the Germans in tanks and mobile units, a fluid fast-moving battle was to their advantage.

Hampered by congestion in the beachhead and forced to divert effort to attack strongly held German positions along the 9.3 mi (15.0 km) route to the town, the 3rd Infantry Division was unable to assault Caen in force and was stopped short of the outskirts. Follow-up attacks were unsuccessful as German resistance solidified; abandoning the direct approach, Operation Perch—a pincer attack by I Corps and XXX Corps—was launched on 7 June, to encircle Caen from the east and west. I Corps, striking south out of the Orne bridgehead, was halted by the 21st Panzer Division and the attack by XXX Corps bogged down in front of Tilly-sur-Seulles, west of Caen, against the Panzer Lehr Division. The 7th Armoured Division pushed through a gap in the German front line and tried to capture the town of Villers-Bocage in the German rear. The Battle of Villers-Bocage saw the vanguard of the 7th Armoured Division withdraw from the town but by 17 June, Panzer Lehr had been forced back and XXX Corps had taken Tilly-sur-Seulles. The British postponed plans for further offensive operations, including a second attack by the 7th Armoured Division, when a severe storm descended upon the English Channel on 19 June. The storm lasted for three days, significantly delaying the Allied build-up. Most of the landing craft and ships already at sea were driven back to ports in Britain; towed barges and other loads (including 2.5 mi (4.0 km) of floating roadways for the Mulberry harbours) were lost and 800 craft were stranded on the Normandy beaches, until the next high tides in July.

=== Epsom, Windsor and Charnwood ===
After a few days to recover from the storm, the British began Operation Epsom on 26 June. The newly arrived VIII Corps (Lieutenant-General Richard O'Connor), was to attack west of Caen, southwards across the Odon and Orne rivers, capture an area of high ground near Bretteville-sur-Laize, encircling the city. The attack was preceded by Operation Martlet, to secure the VIII Corps flank by capturing high ground on the right of the axis of advance. The Germans managed to contain the offensive by committing all their strength, including two panzer divisions just arrived in Normandy, earmarked for an offensive against British and American positions around Bayeux. Several days later, the Second Army made a frontal assault on Caen Operation Charnwood. The attack was preceded by Operation Windsor, to capture the airfield at Carpiquet just outside Caen. By 9 July, Caen north of the Orne and Odon rivers had been captured but German forces retained possession of the south bank and a number of important locations, including the Colombelles steel works, whose tall chimneys commanded the area.

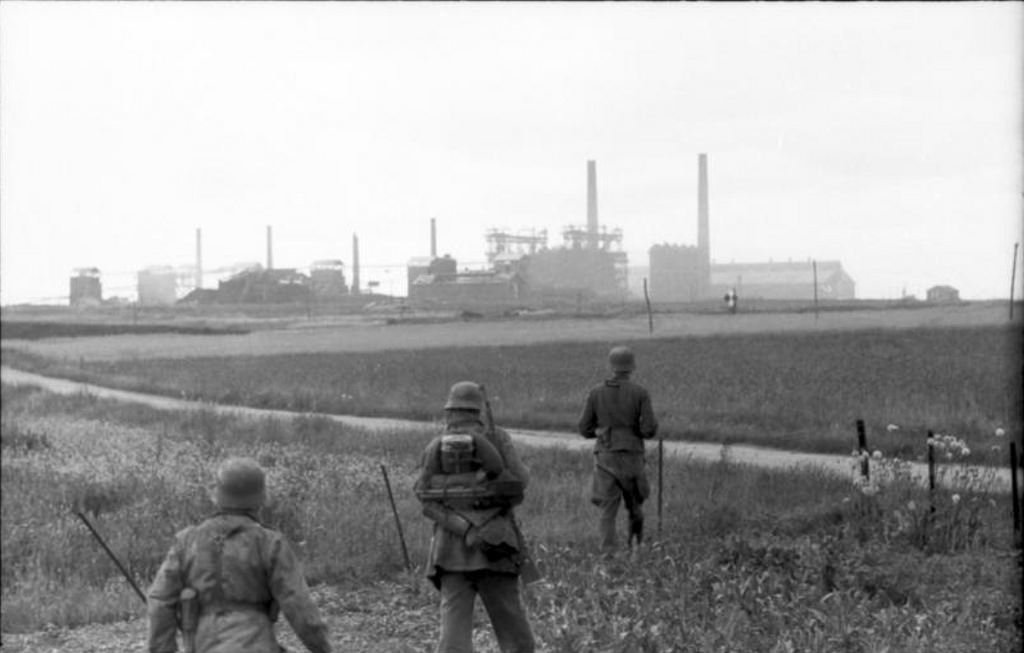
A German patrol moves towards the Colombelles factory area. Some of the tall chimneys used by German observers are visible in the distance.

Shortly after the capture of northern Caen, the British mounted a raid against the Colombelles steelworks complex to the northeast of the city, which was a failure. The factory area remained in German hands, its tall chimneys providing observation posts that overlooked the Orne bridgehead. At 01:00 on 11 July, elements of the 153rd (Highland) Infantry Brigade, supported by Sherman tanks of the 148th Regiment Royal Armoured Corps, moved against the German position. The intention was to secure the area for troops from the Royal Engineers to destroy the chimneys before retiring. At 05:00, the British force was ambushed by Tiger tanks and was forced to withdraw after losing nine tanks. The Second Army launched two preliminary operations; according to General Bernard Montgomery, their purpose was to "engage the enemy in battle unceasingly; we must 'write off' his troops; and generally we must kill Germans". Historian Terry Copp called this the moment where the Normandy campaign became a battle of attrition.

=== Montgomery ===
On 10 July, Montgomery, the commander of all the Allied ground forces in Normandy, held a meeting at his headquarters with Dempsey and Bradley. They discussed 21st Army Group operations, following the conclusion of Operation Charnwood and the failure of the First US Army break-out offensive. Montgomery approved Operation Cobra, an attack to be launched by the First US Army on 18 July. Montgomery ordered Dempsey to "go on hitting: drawing the German strength, especially the armour, onto yourself—so as to ease the way for Brad".

In early July, Montgomery had been informed by the Adjutant-General to the Forces, Ronald Adam that due to the manpower shortage in Britain, the pool of replacements to maintain his infantry strength was nearly exhausted. Dempsey proposed an attack consisting solely of armoured divisions, a concept that contradicted Montgomery's policy of never employing an unbalanced force. (Note: In Fields of Fire, Terry Copp suggested that it was Brigadier Charles Richardson, chief planning officer of 21st Army Group, who provided the starting point and inspiration for Operation Goodwood.) By mid-July, the Second Army had 2,250 medium tanks and 400 light tanks in the bridgehead, of which 500 were in reserve to replace losses. The armoured element of the Second Army consisted of the Guards Armoured Division, 7th Armoured Division and the 11th Armoured Division and the 4th Armoured Brigade, 8th Armoured Brigade, 27th Armoured Brigade and 33rd Armoured brigades, the 31st and 34th Tank brigades and the 2nd Canadian Armoured Brigade. (Note: Excluding the 79th Armoured Division, which never operated as a formation and the 6th Guards Tank Brigade still in England. The tank brigades were equipped with Churchill infantry tanks and a small number of light tanks.)

At 10:00 on 13 July, Dempsey met with Crocker, Lieutenant-General Simonds of II Canadian Corps and O'Connor. Later that day, the first written order for Operation Goodwood—named after the Glorious Goodwood race meetings—was issued. The document contained only preliminary instructions and general intentions; it was to stimulate detailed planning, and alterations were expected. The order was also sent to senior planners in the United Kingdom so that air support for the operation could be secured. When VIII Corps had assembled in Normandy in mid-June, it was suggested that the corps be used to attack out of the Orne bridgehead, to outflank Caen from the east but Operation Dreadnought was cancelled when Dempsey and O'Connor doubted the feasibility of the operation. (Note: There is some disagreement whether Montgomery or Dempsey cancelled the operation. Montgomery wrote that he cancelled the operation over O'Connor's doubts about the plan and decided to attack west of Caen, in what became Operation Epsom; while Dempsey, after the war, told Chester Wilmot that he informed Montgomery that he was going to cancel the proposed operation on 18 June.)

== Prelude ==
=== Goodwood plan ===
The planned attack for operations Atlantic and Goodwood. It shows where the Second Army knew the locations of several German divisions as well as where they believed others were.

In the outline for Goodwood, VIII Corps, with three armoured divisions, would attack southwards out of the Orne bridgehead, a pocket of ground east of the river taken by the Allies on D-Day in Operation Deadstick. The 11th Armoured Division was to advance south-west over Bourguébus Ridge and the Caen–Falaise road, aiming for Bretteville-sur-Laize. The Guards Armoured Division was to push south-east to capture Vimont and Argences and the 7th Armoured Division, starting last, was to aim south for Falaise. The 3rd Infantry Division, supported by part of the 51st (Highland) Infantry Division, was to secure the eastern flank by capturing the area around Émiéville, Touffréville and Troarn. The II Canadian Corps would simultaneously launch Operation Atlantic, a supporting attack on the VIII Corps western flank, to capture Caen south of the Orne river. The British and Canadian operations were tentatively scheduled for 18 July and Cobra was postponed for two days, to enable the First Army to secure its start line around Saint-Lô.

Detailed planning began on Friday 14 July but the next day, Montgomery issued a written directive ordering Dempsey to change the plan from a "deep break-out" to a "limited attack". Anticipating that the Germans would be forced to commit their armoured reserves, rather than risk a massed British tank breakthrough, VIII Corps was instructed to "engage the German armour in battle and 'write it down' to such an extent that it is of no further value to the Germans". He was to take any opportunity to improve the Second Army's position—the orders stated that "a victory on the eastern flank will help us to gain what we want on the western flank"—but not to endanger its role as a "firm bastion" on which the success of the forthcoming American offensive would depend. The objectives of the three armoured divisions were amended to "dominate the area Bourguébus–Vimont–Bretteville", although it was intended that "armoured cars should push far to the south towards Falaise, spread[ing] alarm and despondency". The objectives for the II Canadian Corps remained unchanged and it was stressed that these were vital, only following their achievement would VIII Corps "'crack about' as the situation demands".

The 11th Armoured Division was to lead the advance, screen Cagny and capture Bras, Hubert-Folie, Verrières and Fontenay-le-Marmion. The divisional armoured brigade was to bypass most of the German-held villages in its area, leaving them to be dealt with by follow-up waves. The 159th Infantry Brigade, was initially to act independently of the armoured brigade and capture Cuverville and Démouville. The Guards Armoured Division, advancing behind the 11th Armoured Division, was to capture Cagny and Vimont. Starting last, the 7th Armoured Division was to move south beyond the Garcelles-Secqueville ridge. Further advances by the armoured divisions were to be conducted only on Dempsey's order. The detailed orders for the II Canadian Corps were issued a day later, for the capture of Colombelles, the remaining portion of Caen and then be ready to move on the strongly held Verrières (Bourguébus) Ridge. If the German front collapsed, a deeper advance would be considered.

Second Army intelligence had formed a good estimate of the opposition Goodwood was likely to face, although the German positions beyond the first line of villages had to be inferred, mainly from inconclusive air reconnaissance. The German defensive line was believed to consist of two belts up to 4 mi (6.4 km) deep. Aware that the Germans were expecting a large attack out of the Orne bridgehead, the British anticipated meeting resistance from the 16th Luftwaffe Field Division bolstered by SS-Panzergrenadier Regiment 25 of the 12th SS Panzer Division Hitlerjugend. Signals intelligence found that the Hitler Youth had been moved into reserve and although it was slow to discover that SS-Panzergrenadier Regiment 25 was not with the 16th Luftwaffe Field Division, having also been placed into reserve, this oversight was rectified before 18 July. Battle groups of the 21st Panzer Division with around 50 Panzer IV and 34 assault guns, were expected near Route nationale 13. The 1st SS Division Leibstandarte SS Adolf Hitler was identified in reserve with an estimated 40 Panther tanks and 60 Panzer IV and the presence of two heavy tank battalions equipped with Tiger tanks was established. (Note: The 1st SS Panzer Division had 46 Panthers and 61 Panzer IV. Both battalions were erroneously placed with I SS Panzer Corps but one had been attached to the 21st Panzer Division.) German armoured strength was estimated at 230 tanks and artillery strength at 300 field and anti-tank guns. (Note: Rommel stated that German defences east of the Orne included 194 field guns and 90 anti-tank guns.) The Second Army believed that 90 guns were in the centre of the battle zone, 40 on the flanks and 20 defending the Caen–Vimont railway line. The British had also located a German gun line on the Bourguébus Ridge but its strength and gun positions were unknown.

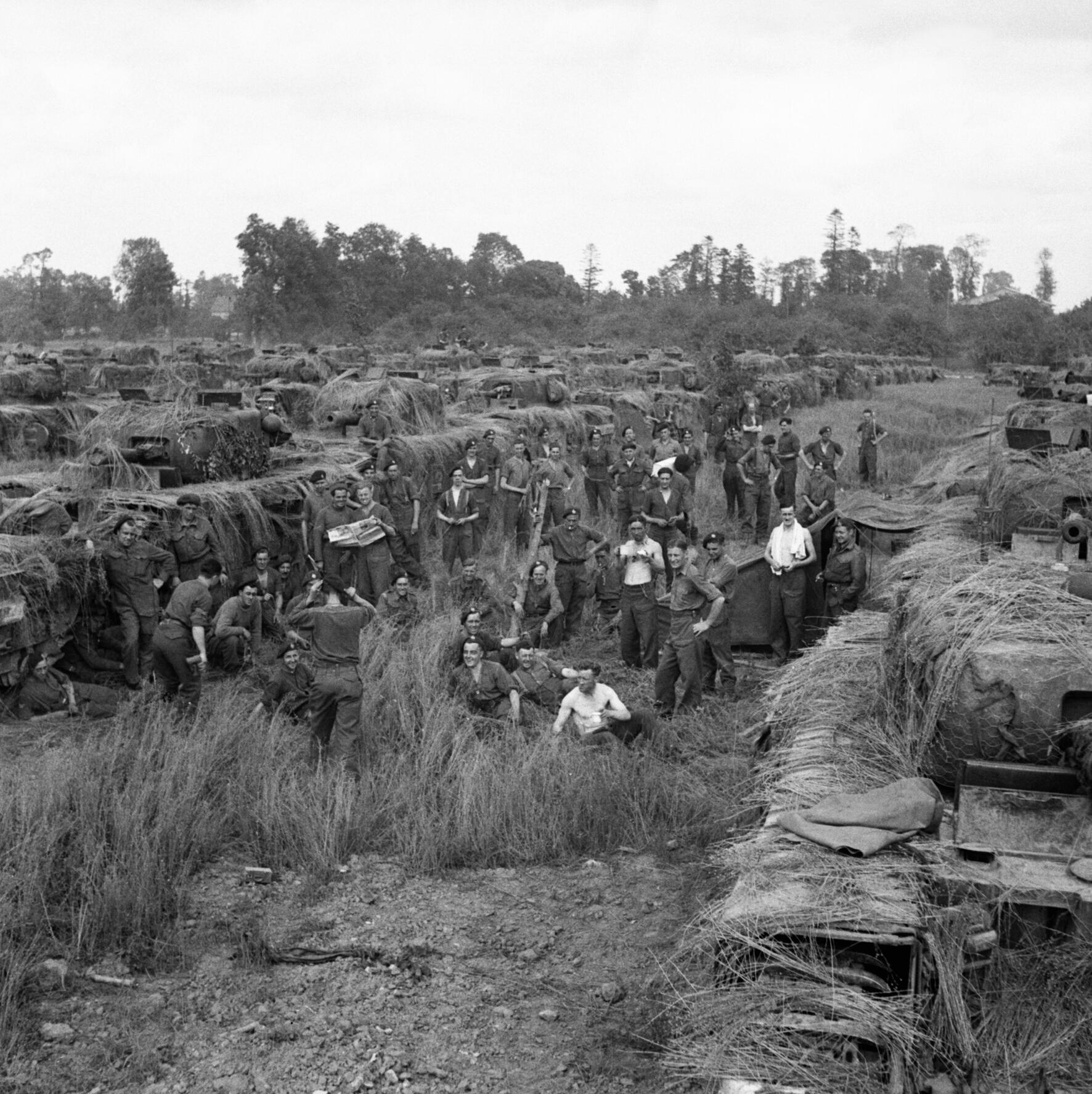
Camouflaged Churchill tanks of the 31st Tank Brigade, which did not take part in Goodwood, highlighting the efforts taken in Normandy to hide vehicles from enemy observers.

To mask the operational objectives, the Second Army initiated a deception plan that included diversionary attacks launched by XII and XXX Corps. The three armoured divisions moved to their staging positions west of the Orne only at night and in radio silence; artillery fire was used to mask the noise of the tank engines. During the hours of daylight all efforts were made to camouflage the new positions.

For artillery support, Goodwood was allocated 760 guns,with 297,600 rounds of ammunition. The artillery consisted of 456 field pieces from 19 field regiments, 208 medium guns from 13 medium regiments, 48 heavy pieces from 3 heavy regiments and 48 heavy anti-aircraft guns from two heavy anti-aircraft regiments. The artillery was provided by I, VIII, XII and II Canadian Corps as well as the 2nd Canadian Army Group Royal Artillery (AGRA) and the 4th AGRA. Each field gun had 500 rounds, each medium piece 300 rounds and each heavy gun or howitzer 150 rounds. Prior to the assault these were to attempt to suppress German anti-tank and field artillery positions. During the attack they would provide the 11th Armoured Division with a rolling barrage and anti-aircraft defence. The guns would also assist the attacks launched by the 3rd Infantry and 2nd Canadian Infantry divisions and fire on targets as requested. Additional support would be provided by three ships of the Royal Navy, whose targets were German gun batteries located near the coast in the region of Cabourg and Franceville. (Note: The monitor HMS Roberts armed with two 15-inch guns and the light cruisers HMS Mauritius and HMS Enterprise armed with twelve and seven 6-inch guns respectively.)

Cromwell tanks moving across York Bridge, a Bailey bridge built over the Caen Canal and the Orne River.

The engineering resources of the Second Army, I Corps and VIII Corps and the divisional engineers worked from 13 to 16 July to build six roads from west of the Orne River to the start lines east of the river and the Caen Canal. Engineers from I Corps strengthened bridges and built two new sets of bridges across the Orne and the canal. The engineers were also to construct another two sets of bridges by the end of the first day. (Note: These were the first of 1,500 Bailey bridges to be built by the British Army during the campaign in north-west Europe.) II Canadian Corps planned to construct up to three bridges across the Orne as quickly as possible to give I Corps and VIII Corps exclusive access to the river and the canal bridges north of Caen. Engineers from the 51st (Highland) Infantry Division, with a small detachment from the 3rd Infantry Division, were ordered to breach the German minefield in front of the Highland Division. This was largely accomplished during the night of 16/17 July, when they cleared and marked fourteen gaps. By the morning of 18 July, 19 40 ft (12 m)-wide gaps had been completed, each for one armoured regiment to pass through at a time. (Note: Following Operation Goodwood it took Royal Engineers five days, during daylight hours, to lift all the mines placed in front of the positions previously held by 51st (Highland) Infantry Division.)

The 159th Infantry Brigade (11th Armoured Division) with the divisional and 29th Armoured Brigade headquarters, crossed into the Orne bridgehead during the night of 16/17 July and the rest of the division followed the next night. The Guards and 7th Armoured divisions were held west of the river until the operation began. As the final elements of the 11th Armoured Division moved into position and the VIII Corps headquarters took up residence in Bény-sur-Mer, more gaps in the minefields were blown, the forward areas were signposted and routes to be taken marked with white tape.

==== Allied air forces ====
Augmenting the preliminary artillery bombardment, 2,077 heavy and medium bombers of the Royal Air Force (RAF) and United States Army Air Forces (USAAF) would attack in three waves, in the largest air raid launched in direct support of ground forces in the campaign so far. (Note: 1,056 heavy bombers of RAF Bomber Command, 539 heavy bombers of the USAAF Eighth Air Force and 482 medium bombers of the USAAF Ninth Air Force.) Speed was of the essence and it was hoped that the aerial bombardment would pave the way for the 11th Armoured Division, rapidly to secure the Bourguébus Ridge. Dempsey believed that if the operation were to succeed, his tanks would need to be on the ridge by the first afternoon and cancelled a second attack by heavy bombers scheduled for then although this was to be in direct support of the advance towards the ridge, he was concerned that the 11th Armoured Division should not have to wait for it. Close air support for Goodwood would be provided by 83 Group RAF, to neutralise German positions on the flanks of VIII Corps, strong points such as the village of Cagny, attacking German gun and reserve positions and the interdiction of German troop movements. Each of the VIII Corps brigade headquarters was allocated a Forward Air Control Post.

=== German preparations ===
The Germans considered the Caen area to be the foundation of their position in Normandy and were determined to maintain a defensive arc from the English Channel to the west bank of the Orne. On 15 July, German military intelligence warned Panzer Group West that from 17 July, a British attack out of the Orne bridgehead was likely. It was thought that the British would push south-east towards Paris. General Heinrich Eberbach, the commanding officer of Panzer Group West, designed a defensive plan, with its details worked out by his two corps and six divisional commanders. A belt of at least 10 miles (16 km) depth was constructed, organised into four defence lines. Villages within the belt were fortified and anti-tank guns placed along its southern and eastern edges. To allow tanks to move freely within the belt, the Germans decided not to establish anti-tank minefields between each defensive line. On 16 July, several reconnaissance flights were mounted over the British front but most of these were driven off by anti-aircraft fire. As dark fell, camera-equipped aircraft managed to bring back photographs taken by the light of flares, which revealed a one-way flow of traffic over the Orne into the British bridgehead. Later that day, a British Spitfire was shot down over German lines while photographing defences; British artillery and fighters attempted to destroy the crashed aircraft without success.

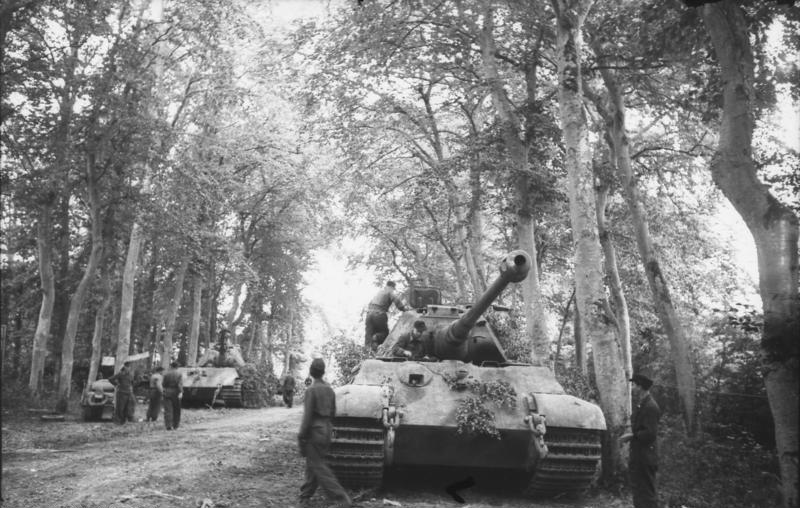
King Tigers belonging to the 503rd heavy tank battalion, hide from Allied aerial reconnaissance.

LXXXVI Corps, reinforced by much artillery, held the front line. The 346th Infantry Division was dug in from the coast to the north of Touffreville and the depleted 16th Luftwaffe Field Division held the next section from Touffreville to Colombelles. Kampfgruppe von Luck, a battle group formed around the 21st Panzer Division 125th Panzergrenadier Regiment, was placed behind these forces with around 30 assault guns. The 21st Panzer Division armoured elements, reinforced with the 503rd Heavy Panzer Battalion, which included ten King Tigers, were north-east of Cagny in a position to support Luck's men and to act as a general reserve and the rest of the divisional panzergrenadiers, with towed anti-tank guns and assault guns, were dug in amongst the villages of the Caen plain. The 21st Panzer Division reconnaissance and pioneer battalions, were positioned on the Bourguébus Ridge to protect the corps artillery, which consisted of around 48 field and medium guns with an equal number of Nebelwerfer rocket launchers. The LXXXVI Corps had 194 artillery pieces, 272 Nebelwerfers and 78 anti-aircraft and anti-tank 88 mm guns. One battery of four 88 mm anti-aircraft guns from the 2nd Flak-Sturm Regiment, was positioned in Cagny, while in the villages along the Bourguébus Ridge there was a screen of 44 x 88 mm anti-tank guns from the 200th Tank Destroyer Battalion. (Note: Trew wrote that there were only around 36 anti-tank guns in the rear positions, including no more than 8–16 pieces on the ridge itself.) Most of the LXXXVI Corps artillery was beyond the ridge covering the Caen–Falaise road.

Facing Caen to the west of the Caen–Falaise road was the I SS Panzer Corps. On 14 July, elements of the 272nd Infantry Division took over the defence of Vaucelles from the 1st SS Division Leibstandarte SS Adolf Hitler, who moved into local reserve between the village of Ifs and the east bank of the Orne. The following day the 12th SS Panzer Division was placed in Oberkommando der Wehrmacht (OKW) reserve to rest and refit and—on Hitler's orders—to be in a position to meet a feared second Allied landing between the Orne and Seine rivers. The divisional artillery regiment and anti-aircraft battalion remained behind to support the 272nd Infantry Division and two battle groups were detached from the division. Kampfgruppe Waldmüller was moved close to Falaise and Kampfgruppe Wünsche to Lisieux, 40 kilometres (25 mi) east of Caen. Although Kampfgruppe Waldmüller was later ordered to rejoin the rest of the division at Lisieux, on 17 July Eberbach halted this move.

=== Preliminary operations ===
==== Operation Greenline ====
Operation Greenline was launched by XII Corps during the evening of 15 July, with the 15th (Scottish) Infantry Division reinforced by a brigade of 53rd (Welsh) Infantry Division, the 34th Tank Brigade, 43rd (Wessex) Infantry Division and the 53rd (Welsh) Infantry Division, minus one brigade. Greenline was intended to convince the German command that the main British assault would be launched west of the Orne, through the positions held by XII Corps and to tie down the 9th and 10th SS Panzer divisions, so that they could not oppose Goodwood or Cobra. Supported by 450 guns, the British attack made use of artificial moonlight and started well despite disruption caused by German artillery fire. (Note: "Artificial moonlight" or "Monty's moonlight" was the term given to the technique of providing illumination at night by reflecting searchlight beams off the cloud layer.) By dawn XII Corps had captured several of its objectives including the important height of Hill 113, although the much-contested Hill 112 remained in German hands. By committing the 9th SS Panzer Division, the Germans managed by the end of the day to largely restore their line, although a counter-attack against Hill 113 failed. Attacks next day by XII Corps gained no further ground and during the evening of 17 July, the operation was closed down and the British force on Hill 113 withdrawn.

==== Operation Pomegranate ====
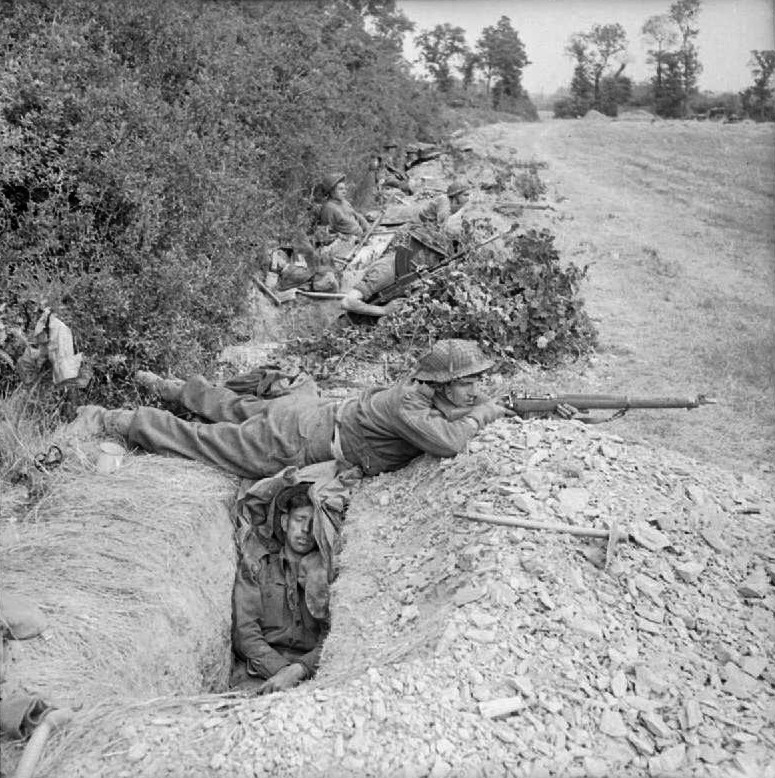
British Infantry occupy slit trenches between Hill 112 and Hill 113 on 16 July 1944.

Operation Pomegranate began on 16 July, in which XXX Corps was to capture several important villages. On the first day British infantry seized a key objective and took 300 prisoners but the next day there was much inconclusive fighting on the outskirts of Noyers-Bocage and Elements of the 9th SS Panzer Division were committed to the village defence. Although the British took control of the railway station and an area of high ground outside the village, Noyers-Bocage itself remained in German hands.

The preliminary operations cost Second Army 3,500 casualties for no significant territorial gains but Greenline and Pomegranate were strategically successful. Reacting to the threats in the Odon Valley, the Germans retained the 2nd Panzer and 10th SS Panzer divisions in the front line and recalled the 9th SS Panzer Division from Corps reserve. The Germans suffered around 2,000 casualties. Terry Copp wrote that the fighting was "one of the bloodiest encounters of the campaign". During the late afternoon of 17 July, a patrolling Spitfire spotted a German staff car on the road near the village of Sainte-Foy-de-Montgommery. The fighter made a strafing attack driving the car off the road. Among its occupants was Field Marshal Erwin Rommel, the commander of Army Group B, who was seriously wounded, leaving Army Group B temporarily leaderless.

== Battle ==
=== 18 July ===
"For forty-five minutes the procession of bombers came on unbroken and when they'd gone, the thunder of the guns swelled up and filled the air, as the artillery carried on the bombardment"

— Chester Wilmot, describing the opening of Operation Goodwood

Shortly before dawn on 18 July, the Highland infantry in the south of the Orne bridgehead, quietly retired 0.5 mi (0.80 km) from the front line. At 05:45, 1,056 Halifax and Lancaster heavy bombers flying at 3,000 ft (910 m) dropped 4,800 long tons (4,900 t) of high explosive bombs around Colombelles, the steelworks, on the positions of the 21st Panzer Division and on the village of Cagny, reducing half of it to rubble. At 06:40 the British artillery opened fire and twenty minutes later, the second wave of bombers arrived. From 10,000–13,000 ft (3,000–4,000 m), American Marauders released 563 long tons (572 t) of fragmentation bombs on the 16th Luftwaffe Field Division, as fighter-bombers attacked German strong points and gun positions. During the 45-minute bombardment, the troops and tanks of the 11th Armoured Division moved out of their concentration areas towards the start line. H Hour was set for 07:45 and on schedule, the artillery switched to a creeping barrage, which moved ahead of the 11th Armoured Division.

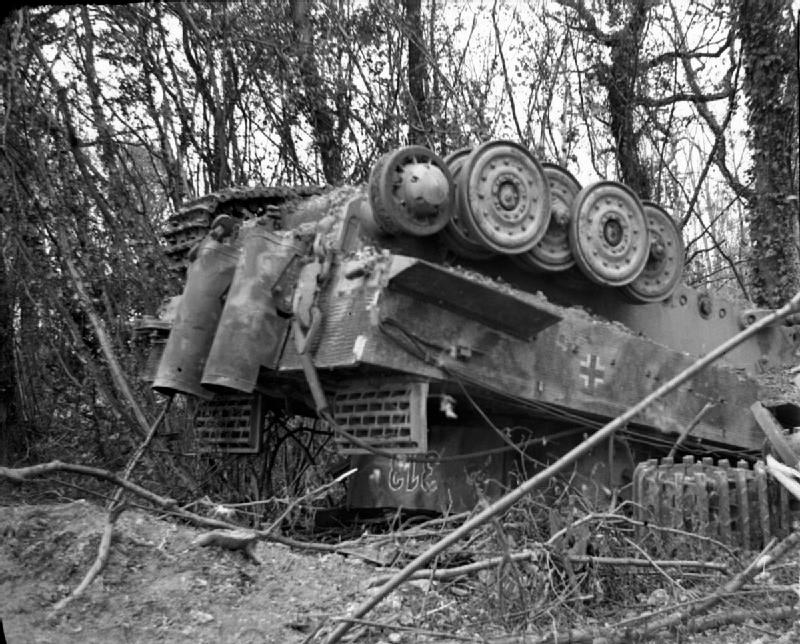
A Tiger I of 3./s.Pz.Abt. 503 (3rd Company 503rd Heavy Tank Battalion) overturned at Manneville by the bombing. Three men survived.

As the division moved off, more artillery opened fire on Cuverville, Demouville, Giberville, Liberville, Cagny and Émiéville and dropped harassing fire on targets as far south as Garcelles-Secqueville and Secqueville la Campagne. Fifteen minutes later, American heavy bombers dropped 1,340 long tons (1,360 t) of fragmentation bombs in the Troarn area and on the main German gun line on the Bourguébus Ridge. Only 25 bombers in the three waves were lost, all to German anti aircraft fire. Aerial support for the operation was then handed over to 800 fighter-bombers of 83 Group and 84 Group.

The bombing put the 22nd Panzer Regiment and the III Company, 503rd Heavy Panzer Battalion temporarily out of action, causing varying degrees of damage to their tanks. Some were overturned, some were destroyed and twenty were later found abandoned in bomb craters. Most of the German front line positions had been neutralised, with the survivors left "dazed and incoherent". Dust and smoke had impaired the ability of the bomber crews to identify all their targets and others on the periphery of the bombing zones had remained untouched. Cagny and Émiéville were extensively bombed but most of the defenders were unscathed and recovered in time to meet the British advance, both places having clear lines of fire on the route the British were to take. The 503rd Heavy Tank Battalion rallied rapidly and got to work digging out their tanks. On Bourguébus Ridge, a number of guns were destroyed by the bombing but most of the artillery and anti-tank guns remained intact.

"It was Hell and I am still astonished that I ever survived it. I was unconscious for a while after a bomb had exploded just front of my tank, almost burying me alive."

— Freiherr von Rosen describing the bombing, which he survived by taking cover under his tank.

By 08:05, the 2nd Fife and Forfar Yeomanry and the 3rd Royal Tank Regiment of the 29th Armoured Brigade had navigated minefields to reach the Caen–Troarn railway line. The first phase of the rolling barrage ended at 08:30, by which time large numbers of prisoners from the 16th Luftwaffe Division had been taken. By the time the artillery resumed firing at 08:50, only the first armoured regiment and a portion of the second had crossed the line. Although opposition was still minimal and more prisoners were taken, the two regiments struggled to keep up with the barrage and were moving out of supporting range of their reserves. On schedule, at 09:00, the barrage lifted and 35 minutes later, the lead squadrons reached the Caen–Vimont railway. In reserve, the 23rd Hussars had managed to clear the first railway line only to become embroiled in a 1 1/2-hour engagement with a battery of self-propelled guns of the 200th Assault Gun Battalion, that had been mistaken for Tiger tanks.

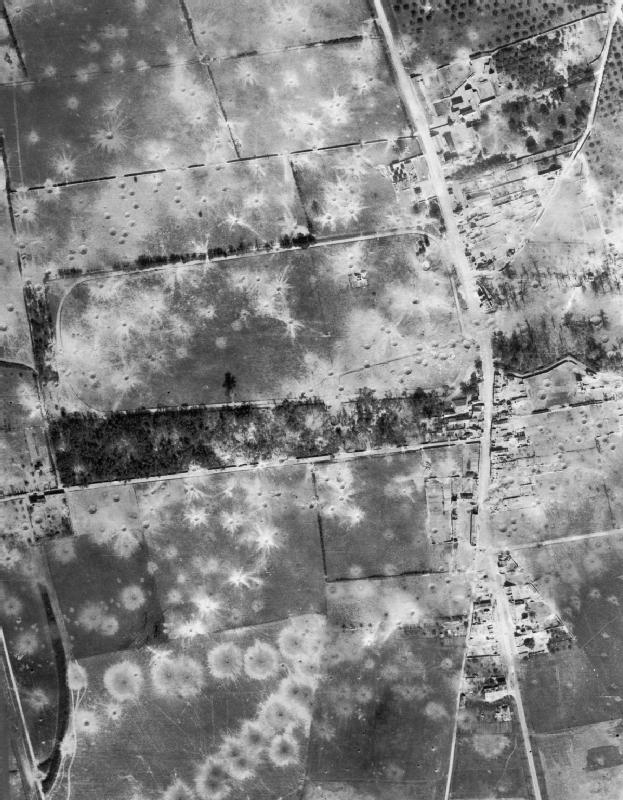
Cagny on 18 July following the Allied bombing raids.

As the 2nd Fife and Forfar Yeomanry advanced past Cagny, they were engaged by anti-tank guns in Cagny to the east. Within a few minutes at least twelve tanks were disabled. The Yeomanry pressed their advance south and were engaged by the main German gun line on the ridge, while the 3rd Royal Tank Regiment, having shifted westward and exchanged fire with the German garrison in Grentheville, moved around the village and advanced along the southern outskirts of Caen, towards Bras and Hubert-Folie. What had been conceived as an attack towards the Bourguébus Ridge by three armoured divisions, had become an unsupported advance by two tank regiments, out of sight of one other, against massed German fire. By 11:15, the British had reached the ridge and the villages of Bras and Bourguébus. Some losses were inflicted on the German tanks but attempts to advance further were met by determined opposition, including fire from the rear from pockets of resistance that had been bypassed.

General Eberbach ordered a counter-attack, "not a defensive move but a full armoured charge". The 1st SS Panzer Division was to attack across the ridge, while in the Cagny area the 21st Panzer Division was to recover the lost ground. German tanks started to arrive on the ridge around noon and the British tank crews were soon reporting German tanks and guns everywhere. Hawker Typhoon fighter-bombers, carrying RP-3 rockets, were directed onto the ridge during the afternoon, delaying and eventually breaking up the 1st SS Panzer Division counter-attack. A final attempt to storm the ridge resulted in the loss of 16 British tanks and a small counter-attack during the afternoon was driven off, with the destruction of six German Panthers.

Just before 10:00, the Guards Armoured Division caught up with the 11th Armoured Division and pressed on towards Cagny. By 12:00 the leading elements were halted, engaged in fighting. A German counter-attack against the 2nd Armoured Grenadier Guards by 19 tanks from the 21st Panzer Division and the Tigers of the 503rd Heavy Panzer Battalion, failed when the German tanks came under fire from their own guns and two Tigers were knocked out. An isolated Tiger II (King Tiger) attempting to manoeuvre out of danger, was caught by an Irish Guards Sherman tank that had also become detached from its unit. The Sherman crew fired into the Tiger and then rammed it; anti-tank fire from other British units then penetrated the Tiger's armour. Both crews abandoned their vehicles and most of the German crew was captured. The 503rd Heavy Panzer Battalion later attacked the Coldstream Guards but was forced to withdraw by massed anti-tank fire. It took the Guards the rest of the day to capture Cagny, which was found abandoned when infantry entered the village. Attempts to resume the advance were met by determined German resistance. Starting last, the only element of the 7th Armoured Division to enter the battle was the 5th Royal Tank Regiment (5th RTR). At 17:00 near Cuverville it knocked out two Panzer IVs for the loss of four tanks and then cleared Grentheville, bypassed earlier in the day by the 3rd RTR, taking several prisoners. A German counter-attack by six tanks petered out after two tanks each were destroyed.

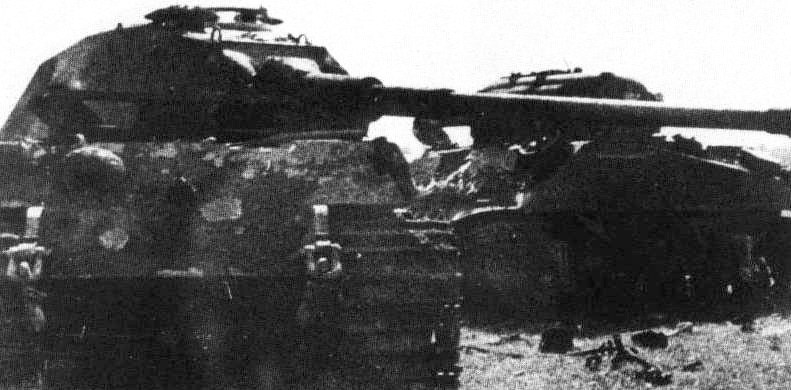
A Sherman (right) of the 2nd Armoured Irish Guards after ramming a King Tiger (left) during the fighting near Cagny.

The 11th Armoured Division pulled back to the Caen–Vimont railway line for the evening and replacement tanks were brought forward for all divisions, with the 11th Armoured receiving priority. German recovery teams went forward to recover as many of their tanks as possible, as few replacements were available. Unnoticed by the British, a gap had been created between Emièville and Troan. This was closed during the night by the 12th SS Panzer Division, which had lost ten tanks, en route, to air attacks. A number of minor German counter-attacks were launched from the ridge; one at dusk was broken up by British artillery and anti-tank fire, which destroyed a Panther and Tiger, another after dark, led by a captured Sherman as a ruse, was repulsed after the Sherman and two Panthers were knocked out by a British anti-tank battery. During the night, German bombers dropped flares over the Orne bridges, which then came under aerial attack. One bridge was slightly damaged and the headquarters of the 11th Armoured Division was hit, as were some tank crews who had survived the fighting.

In their fighting around Cagny, the Guards Armoured Division lost fifteen tanks destroyed and 45 tanks damaged. The 11th Armoured Division lost 126 tanks, forty of which were write-offs; the rest were damaged or had broken down. (The loss of 126 tanks of the 219–244 tanks that crossed the start line has been a common feature of accounts of Goodwood but the divisional commander, the VIII Corps historian and Chester Wilmot gave 126 tank losses. Michael Reynolds gave "...at least 125" and Christopher Dunphie 128 losses.) The armoured divisions suffered 521 casualties during the day, Guards Armoured Division suffered 127 casualties, the 7th Armoured Division had 48 casualties and the 11th Armoured Division had 336 casualties. I Corps was to attack along the left flank of the main armoured thrust. The 3rd Division moved forward at 07:45 hours, supported by 27th Armoured Brigade.

The reaction of the troops of the 346th Infantry Division and the 16th Luftwaffe Field Division was varied; the villages of Sannerville and Banneville la Campagne had been well hit by the preliminary attack by RAF Bomber Command and both were in 3rd Infantry Division hands by noon. Touffreville was on the edge of the Bomber Command aiming point and held out until evening. There was much fighting in the mined and broken country through which the road ran to Troarn. Attacking by that route and from Sannerville, the 3rd Infantry Division found Troarn strongly defended and at nightfall was still about a mile short of the town. Between Manneville and Guillerville, south of the Troarn–Caen road, there was determined fighting against the German infantry of the 711th Infantry Division, rushed up by bicycle from the coast, supported by some Tiger tanks. It was midnight when both villages were cleared. The capture of its objectives, save for Troarn, cost the British 500 casualties and 18 tanks.

=== Operation Atlantic ===
On the Canadian front, Operation Atlantic began at 08:15, with a rolling barrage and infantry and tanks crossed their start line twenty minutes later. At 08:40, British infantry from the 159th Infantry Brigade entered Cuverville; the village and its surrounding area were secured by 10:30 but patrols found Demouville firmly held and attempts to capture this second objective were delayed while the infantry reorganised. The rest of the day saw a slow southward advance, as numerous German positions were cleared. Linking up with their armoured support by nightfall, the infantry dug in around le Mesnil-Frèmentel.

=== 19–20 July ===
The German armour counter-attacked late in the afternoon and fighting continued along the high ground and around Hubert-Folie on 19 July and 20 July, bringing the attack to a halt. On 21 July, Dempsey started to secure his gains by substituting infantry for armour.

== Aftermath ==
=== Analysis ===
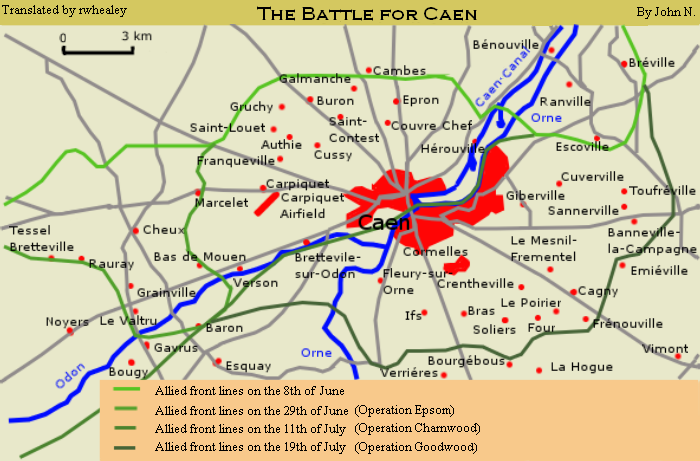
Territory gained in Operations Atlantic and Goodwood

Tactically, the Germans contained the offensive, holding many of their main positions and preventing an Allied breakthrough but they had been startled by the weight of the attack and preliminary aerial bombardment. It was clear that any defensive system less than 5 mi (8.0 km) deep could be overwhelmed at a stroke and the Germans could afford to man their defences in such depth only in the sector south of Caen. Goodwood resulted in the British extending the front line by 7 mi (11 km) to the east of Caen, with the penetration being as much as 12,000 yd (11 km; 6.8 mi) in some places; the southern suburbs of Caen were captured by the Canadians during Operation Atlantic.

The attack reinforced the German view that the greatest danger was on the eastern flank. As German armoured reinforcements arrived in Normandy, they were drawn into defensive battles in the east and worn down. By the end of July only one and a half panzer divisions were facing American forces at the western end of the front, compared with six and a half facing the British and Canadians at the eastern end of the bridgehead. The German defence of Normandy was close to collapse when Operation Cobra breached the thin German defensive 'crust' in the west and few German mechanised units were available to counter-attack. Martin Blumenson, the American official historian, wrote after the war that had Goodwood created a breakthrough, "Cobra would probably have been unnecessary". Goodwood inflicted substantial losses on the German defenders but not a shattering blow. The effect on the morale of the German commanders was greater and added to the loss of Rommel, who was wounded in an RAF air attack. Kluge lost his early optimism on being appointed to replace Rundstedt and wrote to Hitler on 21 July predicting an imminent collapse.

Operation Goodwood was launched at a time of great frustration in the higher command of the Allies, which contributed to the controversy surrounding the operation. The Allied bridgehead was about 20 per cent of the planned size, which led to congestion and some fear of a stalemate. Allied commanders had not been able to exploit their potentially decisive advantages in mobility during June and early July 1944. Much of the controversy surrounding the objectives of the battle originates from the conflicting messages given by Montgomery. He talked up the objectives of Goodwood to the press on the first day, later saying that this was propaganda to encourage the Germans to keep powerful units at the east end of the battlefield.

In the planning of Goodwood, Montgomery appeared to promise that the attack would be a breakthrough and that when the VIII Corps failed to break-out, by some accounts the Supreme Commander, US General Dwight D. Eisenhower, felt he had been misled. While his intermittent communications to Supreme Headquarters Allied Expeditionary Force (SHAEF) appeared to promise a breakthrough, Montgomery was writing orders to his subordinates for a limited attack. Copies of orders forwarded to SHAEF called for an armoured division to take Falaise, a town far in the German rear. Three days prior to the attack, Montgomery revised the orders, eliminating Falaise as an objective but neglected to forward copies of the revision; Eisenhower was later furious at the result, which dogged Montgomery, as it allowed his detractors, especially Air Marshal Arthur Tedder, to imply that the operation was a failure.

Stephen Biddle wrote that Goodwood was a significant tactical setback for Montgomery. Despite having preponderant force and air superiority, British progress was slow and ultimately failed to break through. Montgomery chose an unusually narrow spearhead of just 2 km (1.2 mi), which created a congested line of advance. British infantry was lacking in suitable junior officers and non-commissioned officers, which inhibited small-unit tactics. In Biddle's analysis,

The British systematically failed to coordinate movement and suppressive fires after about mid-morning of the opening day. ... The attack had by then moved beyond the reach of the British batteries on the northern side of the Orne River and the congestion in the march columns had kept the artillery from moving forward into supporting range. ... The net result was thus an exposed, massed, nearly pure-tank assault pressing forward rapidly without supporting infantry or supporting suppressive fires.

— Biddle

The Germans, by contrast, made great efforts to conceal their forces—moving under cover of dark, off the main roads, in small units and under radio silence.

=== Casualties ===
Colonel Charles Stacey, the Canadian official historian, gave casualties of all Canadian units in Europe, for the four days' fighting of 1,965 in all categories; 441 men were killed or died of wounds. In 2001, Michael Reynolds quoted the 21st Army Group war diary of casualties in I and VIII Corps of 3,474 men. In 2004, Simon Trew wrote that "the first estimates of Allied losses for Operation Goodwood appeared horrific, that Second Army had lost 4,011 men ...", "no conclusive assessment can ever be made" in regards to the losses of both sides. In 2006, G. S. Jackson gave casualties in the armoured divisions from 18 to 19 July of 1,020 men. Terry Copp wrote in 2007 that Operation Atlantic cost the Canadians from 1,349 to 1,965 casualties. In 2014, John Buckley gave a figure of 5,500 casualties during Goodwood and Atlantic.

Over 2,000 German prisoners were taken and c. 100 tanks were destroyed. Jackson also wrote of c. 100 German tank losses. In the official history, Major Lionel Ellis, wrote that the 1st SS and 21st Panzer divisions lost 109 tanks on the first day of the battle. Reynolds recorded 77 German tanks or assault guns knocked out or damaged during the operation and that the claim of 75 tanks or assault guns destroyed—as stated in a post-war interview, by the commanding officer of the 11th Armoured Division, for a British staff college training film on the operation—"can be accepted as accurate". Michael Tamelander wrote in 2004 that Panzergruppe West recorded the loss of 75 tanks during the period from 16 to 21 July.

British tank losses during Goodwood have been debated, with the loss ranging from 218 to 500. In addition to VIII Corps losses, about twenty tanks were lost in the flanking operations. Reynolds wrote that study of the records suggests that the maximum number of tanks lost during Operation Goodwood was 253, most of which were damaged rather than write-offs. Tamelander and Zetterling wrote that during Goodwood 469 tanks were lost by the armoured divisions (including 131 tanks on 19 July and 68 on 20 July) but that the majority could be repaired. Trew rejected those figures and wrote that after much investigation, VIII Corps losses amounted to 197 tanks on 18 July, 99 tanks on 19 July and 18 tanks on 20 July, "for a total of 314, of which 130 were completely destroyed". Trew wrote that "the tank strength returns for VIII Corps 18–21 July show a loss of 218 tanks (that could not be repaired or immediately replaced), including 145 tanks from 11th Armoured Division". In 2014 John Buckley wrote that 400 British tanks were knocked out and that many were recovered and put back into service, although the morale of some of the crews deteriorated.
