= National Fitness Council =

The National Fitness Council in the UK (1937 - 1939) was a government organisation to promote fitness set up according to the Physical Training and Recreation Act, 1937.

The Secretary was Lionel Ellis.

The National Fitness Council consisted of an Advisory Committee for England and Wales and a Grant Committee. There were 22 Area Committees to review existing facilities, to encourage local schemes, to consider applications for grant and to forward these applications with their recommendations to the Grants Committee.

It provided grants towards the provision of playing fields, boys' clubs, youth hostels, gymnasia, swimming baths and expert leadership. Over 865 schemes were funded fully, or in part during the Council's existence although there was debate over its effectiveness. The grants were intended to improve facilities in poorer regions of the country.

The Council was suspended at the start of the Second World War and was not continued post-war, transferring its activities to the Ministry of Education.
