= Simon Trew =

British historian (born 1965)

- Born: 1965
- Occupation: Military historian

Academic background
- Education: Keele University
- Alma mater: Keele University (B.A.) (PhD)
- Thesis: No Pity Distilled: Britain, Mihailovic and the Chetniks, 1941-2 (1991)

Academic work
- Discipline: History
- Sub-discipline: Military history, Yugoslav history
- Institutions: Royal Military Academy Sandhurst; Keele University
- Main interests: Second World War in Europe; Normandy campaign; Balkans campaign

Simon Trew (born 1965) is a British military historian and author, specialising in D-Day and the Normandy Campaign. Trew served as a senior lecturer in the Department of War Studies at the Royal Military Academy Sandhurst for nearly three decades, also serving at times as deputy and acting head. Trew has been featured in various television historical documentaries and live broadcasts, and has received a nomination for an Emmy award in 2009 for his contributions as a historical consultant.

== Early life and education ==
Born in 1965, Trew earned a First Class Honours Bachelor's degree in International Relations from Keele University in 1986, before completing his PhD in History in 1992. His doctoral dissertation No Pity Distilled: Britain, Mihailovic and the Chetniks, 1941-2 focused on British relations with the Yugoslav Chetnik resistance movement during the Second World War.

== Career ==
Trew lectured at the University of Keele before joining Royal Military Academy Sandhurst where he served as a senior lecturer in the Department of War Studies from 1993 to 2022. During this time, he also held roles as deputy head of department from 2002 to 2012 and acting head from 2013 to 2014. Recognised as an expert on D-Day and the Normandy Campaign, Trew has made numerous appearances in television historical documentaries and live broadcasts, including the BBC's commemorative anniversary broadcasts from Normandy.

In 2004, the 13-part series Battle Zone Normandy, that he edited and contributed to, was selected in The Times D Day: Essential reading by the organisers of the Imperial War Museum’s D-Day exhibition. In 2009 he was nominated for an Emmy award for his work as historical consultant on the BBC documentary D-Day: The True Story of Omaha Beach.

== Select bibliography ==
- Trew, S. (2012). D-Day and the Battle of Normandy: The Photographic History. Haynes Publishing UK. ISBN 978-1-84425-868-0.
- Battle Zone Normandy: Gold Beach. Sutton Publishing. 2016. ISBN 978-0-7509-3011-6.
- With Stephen Badsey: Trew, S.; Badsey, S. (2004). Battle for Caen. Battle zone Normandy. Sutton. ISBN 978-0-7509-3010-9.
- In: Badsey, S.; Latawski, P. (2004). "Yugoslav Quagmires: The Image of the Past and the Fear of Intervention". Britain, NATO and the Lessons of the Balkan Conflicts, 1991 -1999. The Sandhurst Conference Series. Taylor & Francis. ISBN 978-1-135-76407-4.
- In: Badsey, S. (2000). "The Battle for Crete 1941 - The Pyrrhic Victory; The Battle of Berlin 1945 - The Final Battle". The Hutchinson Atlas of World War II Battle Plans: Before and After. Routledge. ISBN 978-1-315-06324-9.
- Trew, S.; King's College London (1998). Britain, Mihailović, and the Chetniks, 1941-42. Studies in military and strategic history. St. Martin's Press in association with King's College, London. ISBN 978-0-312-17757-7.
- With Bob Carruthers: Carruthers, B.; Trew, S. (2000). The Normandy Battles. Cassell. ISBN 978-0-304-35396-5.
- With Gary Sheffield: Trew, S.; Sheffield, G. (2000). 100 Years of Conflict, 1900-2000. Sutton. ISBN 978-0-7509-2170-1.
- As editor: Reynolds, A.; Trew, S. (2019). To War Without Arms: The D-Day Diary of an Army Chaplain. Sabrestorm Publishing. ISBN 978-1-78122-014-6.
- As editor: Carruthers, B.; Trew, S. (2004). Servants of Evil: New First-Hand Accounts of the Second World War from Survivors of Hitler's Armed Forces. MBI Publishing Company LLC. ISBN 978-0-7603-2171-3.
- Trew, S. No pity distilled: Britain and the Chetniks, 1941 - 1942. British thesis. British Libr. Document Supply Centre.

== Television appearances ==
- BBC Timewatch Bloody Omaha: with Richard Hammond
- BBC One Britain at War - The Road To Victory
