= Lionel Ellis =

British military historian (1885–1970)

Lionel Frederic Ellis CVO CBE DSO MC (13 May 1885 – 19 October 1970) was a British Army officer and military historian, author of three volumes of the official History of the Second World War.

Between the two World Wars, he was General Secretary of the National Council of Social Service (1919–1937) and then Secretary of the National Fitness Council (1937–1939). In the 1950s he was an Associate Warden of Toynbee Hall.

== Career ==
Born in Nottingham, in 1916 Ellis was commissioned into the Welsh Guards from the Inns of Court Officers' Training Corps and saw service in the First World War. Ellis was awarded a Military Cross, the citation for which reads:

For conspicuous gallantry and resource while commanding the leading company in an attack. When the troops on his left lost direction, he went across and gave the officer in charge his correct bearing. On reaching the first objective the leading waves were thrown back by machine-gun fire. He at once went forward, reorganised them, and succeeded in taking the position. It was due to his fine leadership that the objectives were gained.

In 1919 he was awarded the Distinguished Service Order for gallantry and devotion to duty, in the advance south of Bavai in the days before the Armistice of 11 November 1918. The medal's citation reads:

For conspicuous gallantry and devotion to duty in the advance south of Bavai on 6th November, 1918. When the whole battalion was held up at the railway, he brought his company headquarters up to reinforce his company, and, calling on his men to follow him, rushed across the railway bank, surprising and routing the enemy, whom he followed up on a spur, until held up by a fresh machine-gun position. His energy and resource encouraged his men to overcome all difficulties, and resulted in the capture of Prihart Farm. He subsequently reorganised the company on his left, which was in difficulties, and finally brought up and posted a support company, securing the left flank of the division.

He returned to civilian life and became the first General Secretary of the new National Council of Social Service, a position he held from 1919 to 1937, then the first Secretary of the new National Fitness Council, 1937 to 1939, working with Lord Aberdare, the first chairman. In the 1930 Birthday Honours, Ellis was appointed a Commander of the Order of the British Empire "for services in connection with the Coalfields Distress Fund" and in 1937 a Commander of the Royal Victorian Order.

On 18 September 1939, shortly after the beginning of the Second World War, Ellis returned to the Welsh Guards and was later appointed as an official historian, contributing three volumes to the History of the Second World War. After the war, he was an Associate Warden of Toynbee Hall.

His The War in France and Flanders (1954) begins with the Phoney War of 1939–1940 and deals with the failed attempts of the British Expeditionary Force to defend Belgium and France from the German invasion of May and June 1940. It ends with the confusion of the Belgian surrender, the British failure to defend the Somme and the decision to evacuate British forces from Dunkirk. His later volumes dealt with the Normandy Campaign and the defeat of Germany.

== Private life ==
In 1916, Ellis married Jane Richmond (died 1953) in the Southwark district and they had a son, Christopher St John Ellis (1920–1997), who served in the Royal Naval Volunteer Reserve during the Second World War and became a schoolmaster and also one daughter. Ellis died at Harlington, Middlesex, on 19 October 1970. Ellis was a painter and a friend of Rex Whistler, who was stationed with him during the Second World War.

== Major publications ==
- Welsh Guards at War (1946)
- History of the Second World War, United Kingdom Military Series: The War in France and Flanders 1939–1940 (London: HM Stationery Office, 1954)
- History of the Second World War, United Kingdom Military Series: Victory in the West: The Battle of Normandy by L. F. Ellis, with G. R. G. Allen, A. E. Warhurst, and Sir James Robb (London, H.M. Stationery Office, 1962)
- History of the Second World War, United Kingdom Military Series: Victory in the West: The Defeat of Germany (1968)
