= Banneville-la-Campagne =

- Commune
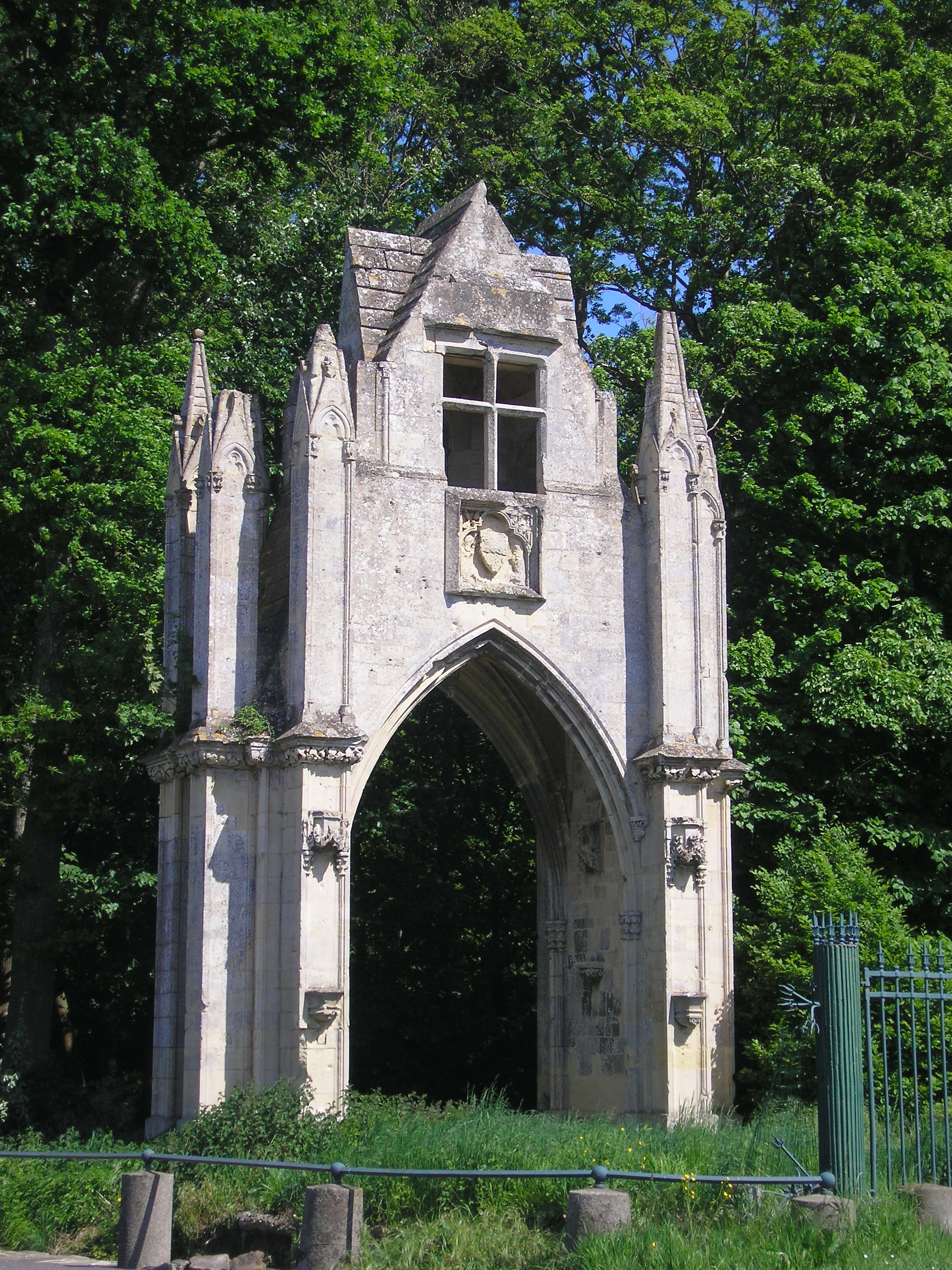
- Entrance to the Abbey of Saint Martin of Troarn
- Location of Banneville-la-Campagne
- Location within France Location within Normandy
- Coordinates: 49°10′09″N 0°13′07″W
- Country: France
- Region: Normandy
- Department: Calvados
- Arrondissement: Caen
- Canton: Troarn
- Intercommunality: CC Val ès Dunes

Government
  - Mayor (2020–2026): Anne Baugas
- Area^{1}: 6.44 km^{2} (2.49 sq mi)
- Elevation: 10 m (33 ft)
- Highest elevation: 24 m (79 ft)
- Lowest elevation: 3 m (9.8 ft)
- Population (2023): 187
  - Density: 29.0/km^{2} (75.2/sq mi)
- Time zone: UTC+01:00 (CET)
  - Summer (DST): UTC+02:00 (CEST)
- INSEE/Postal code: 14036 /14940
- ^{1} French Land Register data, which excludes lakes, ponds, glaciers > 1 km^{2} (0.386 sq mi or 247 acres) and river estuaries.

Banneville-la-Campagne (French pronunciation: [banvil la kɑ̃paɲ]) is a commune in the Calvados department in the Normandy region of north-western France.

== Geography ==
Banneville-la Campagne is located some 8 km east of the centre of Caen just south of Sannerville. Access to the commune is by the D675 from Caen which forms the northern border of the commune as it goes east to Troarn. The D227 comes from Sannerville in the north and goes south through the village then continues to join the D225 south of the commune. The D225 comes from Troarn in the east and passes south-west through the eastern part of the commune and continues south to Émiéville. The A13 autoroute (Autoroute de Normandie: Caen to Paris) passes through the heart of the commune and the village from west to east with the intersection with the A813 autoroute (Banneville-la-Campagne to Frénouville) on the south-western border of the commune. The nearest exit is Exit 30 to the D675 just east of the commune. Apart from the village there are the hamlets of Manneville in the south-west and Le Havre in the south-east. The commune is almost entirely farmland.

The Ruisseau du Pont Bâle forms most of the eastern border of the commune as it flows north to join the Fosse du Val on the northern border of the commune. The Ruisseau de Banneville rises in the commune and flows east to join the Ruisseau du Pont Bâle as does the Cours de Guillerville in the south-east where it forms part of the southern border of the commune.

== Toponymy ==
The name Banneville was attested as Magnevilla in 1198.

The suffix -ville means in the old sense "rural domain" (cf. vilain), preceded by the Old Norse personal surname Norse Barn meaning "child".

The name is a homonym with all the Barnevilles in Normandy.

The complementary determinant -la-Campagne was attested from 1371 and refers to the campagne de Caen (the Caen Plain). This term belongs to the Northern Norman dialect and equivalent to the central French champagne. The Norman-Picard word campagne (Rural area) has been incorporated in standard French.

The name allows it to be distinguished from Banneville-sur-Ajon, another town in Calvados. It is uncertain that it shares the same etymology. The form Barneville sur Ajon was already mentioned in 1371.

== History ==
In 1828 Banneville-la-Campagne (30 inhabitants in 1821) absorbed Guillerville (100 inhabitants in the southeast of the territory) and Manneville (47 inhabitants in the south-west).

During the Invasion of Normandy Guillerville was attacked on 19 July 1944 by the British 3rd Infantry Division as part of Operation Goodwood as part of the taking of the town of Troarn to the east. British tanks of the 27th Armoured Brigade faced the tanks of the Wehrmacht 21st Panzer Division and Tiger I tanks of the 503rd battalion of heavy tanks. Guillerville was finally liberated in the operation but not Troarn.

== Administration ==
List of Successive Mayors

| From | To | Name |
|---|---|---|
| 2001 | 2008 | Robert Barron |
| 2008 | 2014 | Ann Drevon |
| 2014 | 2026 | Anne Baugas |

== Demography ==
The inhabitants of the commune are known as Bannevillais or Bannevillaises in French.

Historical population

| Year | Pop. | ±% p.a. |
|---|---|---|
| 1793 | 53 | — |
| 1821 | 30 | −2.01% |
| 1846 | 149 | +6.62% |
| 1872 | 133 | −0.44% |
| 1901 | 123 | −0.27% |
| 1926 | 119 | −0.13% |
| 1946 | 70 | −2.62% |
| 1962 | 117 | +3.26% |
| 1968 | 118 | +0.14% |

| Year | Pop. | ±% p.a. |
|---|---|---|
| 1975 | 89 | −3.95% |
| 1982 | 84 | −0.82% |
| 1990 | 76 | −1.24% |
| 1999 | 88 | +1.64% |
| 2007 | 112 | +3.06% |
| 2012 | 139 | +4.41% |
| 2017 | 173 | +4.47% |
| 2023 | 187 | +1.31% |

Source: EHESS and INSEE

== Sites and monuments ==
- A Chateau Gateway (14th century) is registered as an historical monument. It is the old gateway of the Abbey of Saint-Martin of Troarn which was removed in 1843 for the construction of the road from Troarn to Saint-Samson. It was re-erected, at the request of Gaston-Robert, Marquis de Banneville, in the commune of Banneville where it now serves as the entrance to the chateau.

== See also ==
- Communes of the Calvados department
