= Argences =

- Commune
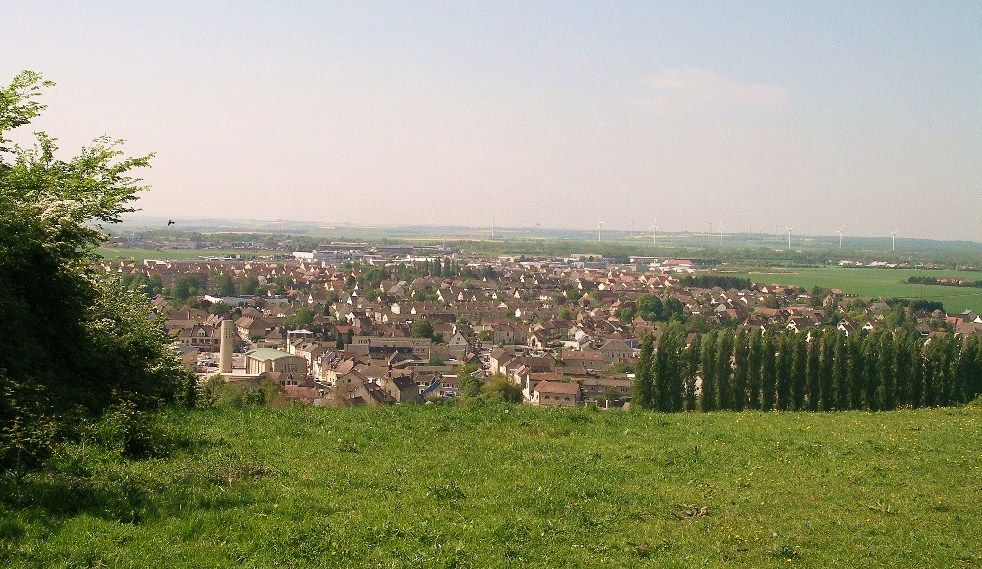
- General view of Argences

- Coat of arms
- Location of Argences
- Location within France Location within Normandy
- Coordinates: 49°07′37″N 0°09′59″W
- Country: France
- Region: Normandy
- Department: Calvados
- Arrondissement: Caen
- Canton: Troarn
- Intercommunality: CC Val ès Dunes

Government
  - Mayor (2023–2026): Marie-Françoise Isabel
- Area^{1}: 9.76 km^{2} (3.77 sq mi)
- Elevation: 44 m (144 ft)
- Highest elevation: 74 m (243 ft)
- Lowest elevation: 2 m (6.6 ft)
- Population (2023): 3,959
  - Density: 406/km^{2} (1,050/sq mi)
- Time zone: UTC+01:00 (CET)
  - Summer (DST): UTC+02:00 (CEST)
- INSEE/Postal code: 14020 /14370
- ^{1} French Land Register data, which excludes lakes, ponds, glaciers > 1 km^{2} (0.386 sq mi or 247 acres) and river estuaries.

Argences (French pronunciation: [aʁʒɑ̃s]) is a commune in the Calvados department in the Normandy region of north-western France. It is in the urban area of Caen, 15 kilometres from the city.

The commune has been awarded one flower by the National Council of Towns and Villages in Bloom in the Competition of cities and villages in Bloom.

== Geography ==
Argences is some 15 km south-east of Caen and 1 km north of Moult. Access to the commune is by the D37 road from Saint-Pair in the north passing through the commune and the town and continuing to Moult in the south. The D41 road goes east from the town to join the D613 to Caen at Vimont. The D80 road also goes north-east from the town to Saint-Pierre-du-Jonquet. Apart from the town there are also the hamlets of Le Fresne to the north, Le Mesnil in the north-east, and Le Croix de Moult south of the town. The commune consists of a large residential area in the town with a large forest in the north-east (the Bois de Saint-Gilles) with small scattered forests but mostly farmland.

The Muane river flows through the town and the commune from south to north.

== History ==
In 989, Richard I of Normandy donated land to the Abbey of Fécamp for the curates of Mondeville and Argences. From that date, the domain of Mondeville was managed as an ecclesiastical fief by the Barony of Argences. During the ducal era the wines of Argences were highly regarded.

In 1912, the large tile factory at Fresne built a railway line 4 km long connecting Argences to Moult-Argences Station in Moult on the Paris-Cherbourg line. The line from Argences was closed in 1931 and the nearest station is now Moult-Argences (TER Basse-Normandie).

On 16 April 1942, a group of resistance fighters derailed a Maastricht-Cherbourg train two kilometres from Moult-Argences station in Airan commune causing 28 dead and 19 wounded - all German soldiers. On 30 April of that year, in revenge for German retaliation, a new derailment of the same train killed 10 German soldiers and wounded 22 others.

=== Heraldry ===
Arms of Argences	Blazon: Gules, 3 laurel branches Vert, 1 pale in chief, 2 stems in base saltirewise between 3 mitres of Or the fanons of the one in base debruised by the laurel leaves.

== Administration ==
List of Mayors

Mayors from the French Revolution to 1929

From	To	Name	Party	Position
1790	1791	Pierre Michel Gouget		
1791	1792	André Pierre Duval-Destin		
1792	1794	Robert Lesage		
1794	1795	Nicolas Guillaume Moulin		
1795	1796	Pierre Robert Caillouie		
1796	1797	Joseph Bornet		
1797	1798	Jean Mathieu Duport		
1798	1799	Joseph Bornet		
1799	1799	Nicolas Guillaume Moulin		
1799	1800	André Halbique		
1800	1806	Pierre Duval-Destin		
1806	1808	Pierre Robert Cailloue		
1808	1812	François Huillard		
1812	1815	Ferdinand Desessarts		
1815	1826	Nicolas Moulin		
1826	1828	Jean Baptiste Honore		
1828	1830	Jean Duport		
1830	1840	Modeste Ancelle		
1840	1841	Germain Lecharpertier		
1841	1843	Jean Doublet		
1843	1859	Modeste Ancelle		
1859	1871	Armand Laville		
1871	1874	Germain Lecharpertier		
1874	1874	Armand Laville		
1874	1896	Dominique Lecomte		
1896	1908	Joseph Dalgot		
1908	1912	Désiré Lepetit		
1912	1921	André Gourmez		
1921	1929	Clément Michel		

Mayors from 1929

From	To	Name	Party	Position
1929	1945	Jean Hamel		
1945	1947	Albert Frilley		
1947	1953	Jean Hamel		
1953	1954	René Maginier		
1954	1965	André Plantain		
1965	1970	Michel Jourdan		
1970	1971	Georges Lemesle		
1971	1979	Alfred Rouillard		
1979	1989	Gilbert Deru		
1989	1995	Jean-François Hamel		
1995	2001	Gilbert Deru		
2001	2008	Bernard Dufour		Retired ETF officer
2008	2023	Dominique Delivet	LREM	Headmaster
2023	2026	Marie-Françoise Isabel		

== Population ==
The inhabitants of the commune are known as Argençais or Argençaises in French.

Historical population
Year	Pop.	±% p.a.
1968	1,802	—
1975	2,215	+2.99%
1982	3,000	+4.43%
1990	3,048	+0.20%
1999	3,241	+0.68%
2007	3,495	+0.95%
2012	3,596	+0.57%
2017	3,718	+0.67%
2023	3,959	+1.05%
Source: INSEE

== Economy ==
The newspaper L'Echo de la Muance was published in Argences from 1896 to 1897.

== Sites and monuments ==
- The Chateau of Fresne (1651) is registered as a Monument historique.
- The Church of Saint-Jean was destroyed by bombing in 1944 and only the wall of the apse remains.
- The Moulin de la Porte (Mill of the door) where the wheel is powered by the Muance.
- The Lavoir (Public laundry) in the Rue de la Morte eau.
- The old Tuileries de Beauvais tile factory.

=== Argences picture gallery ===
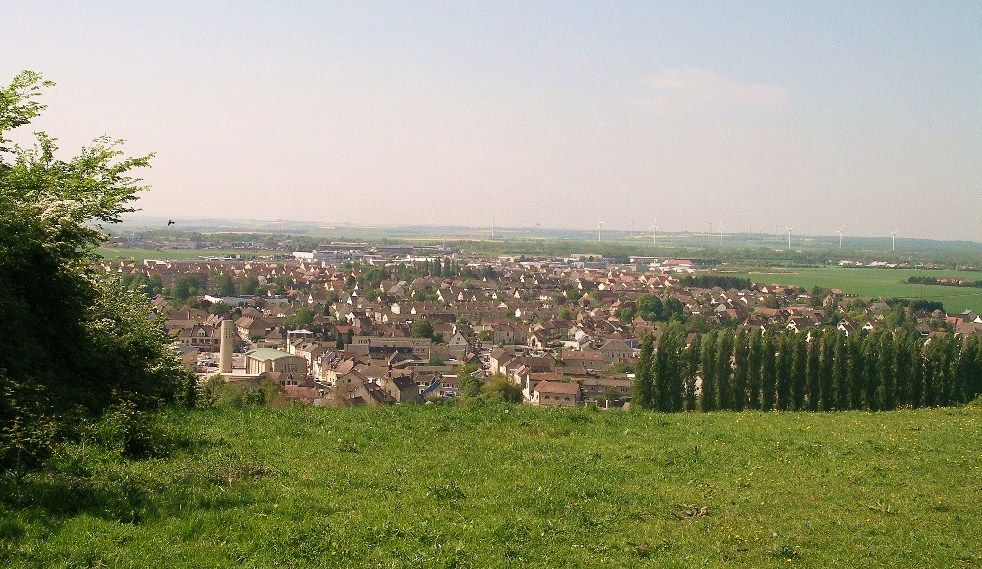
General view of Argences

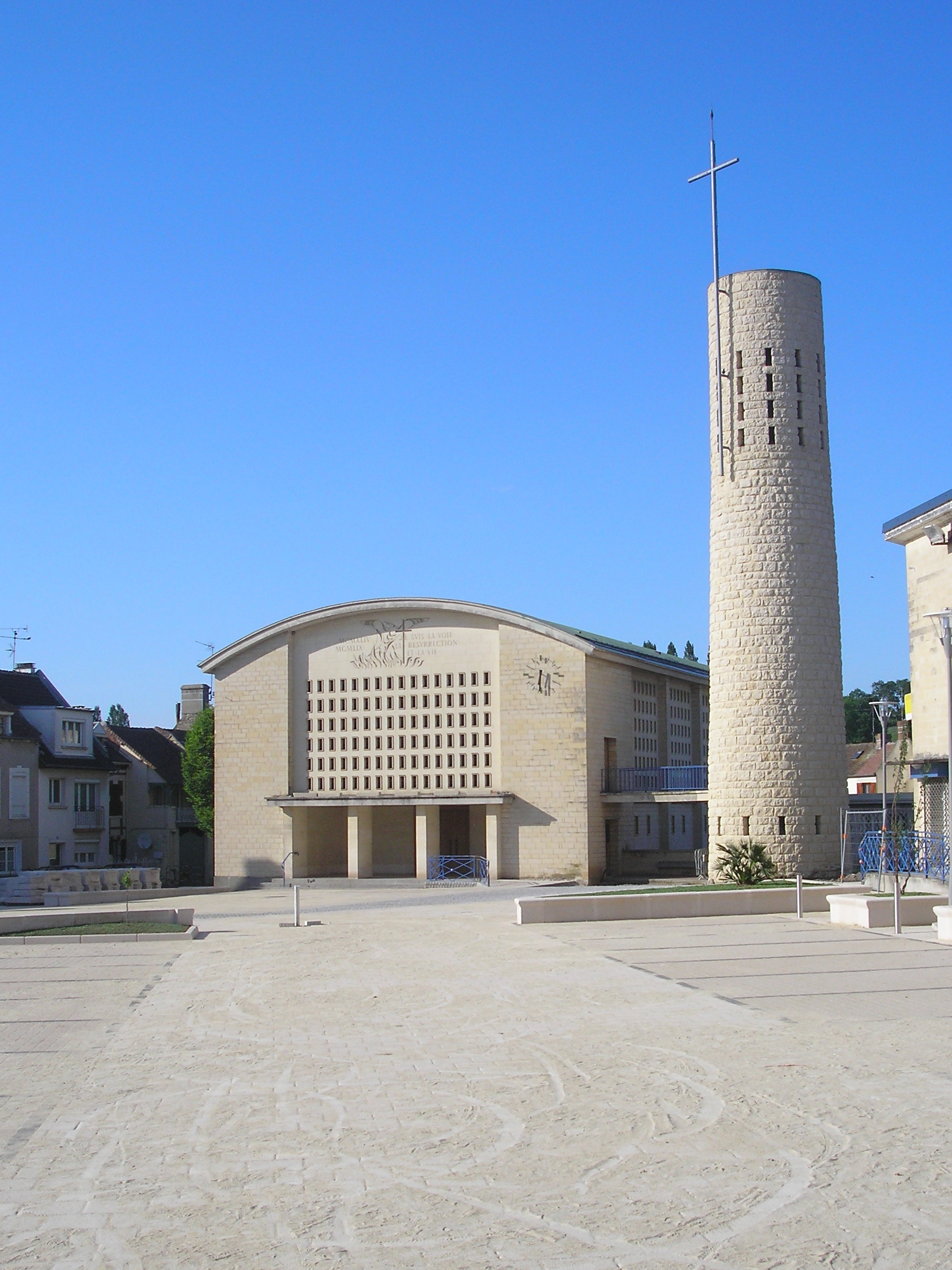
General Leclerc Square and the church

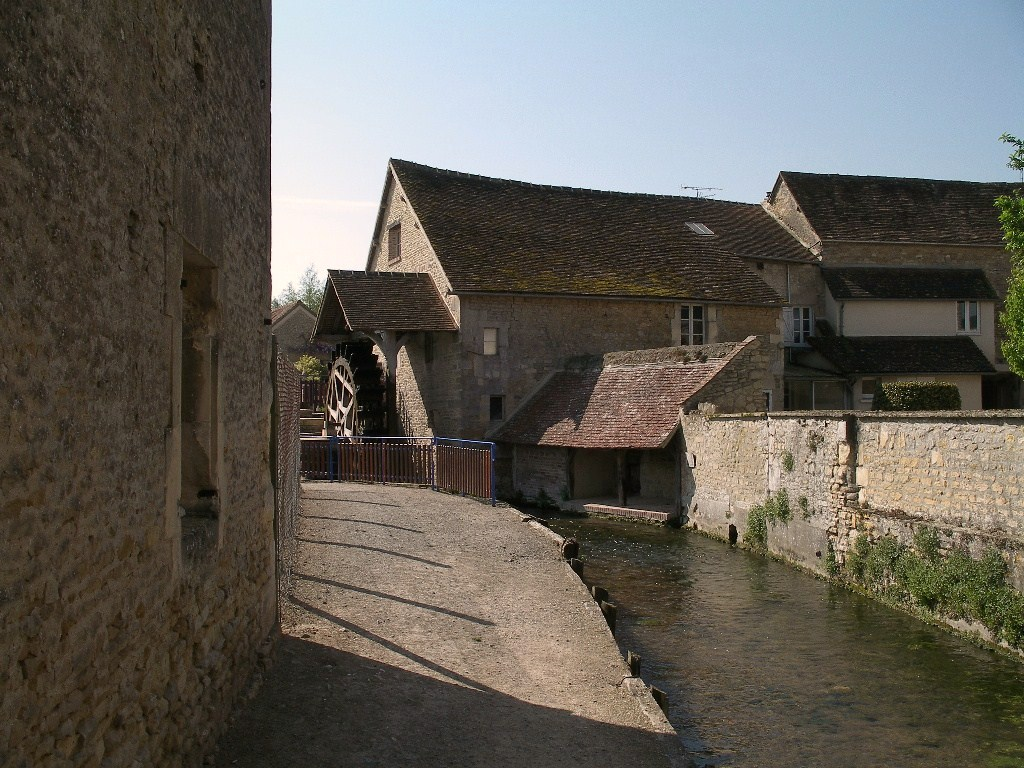
The Moulin de la Porte

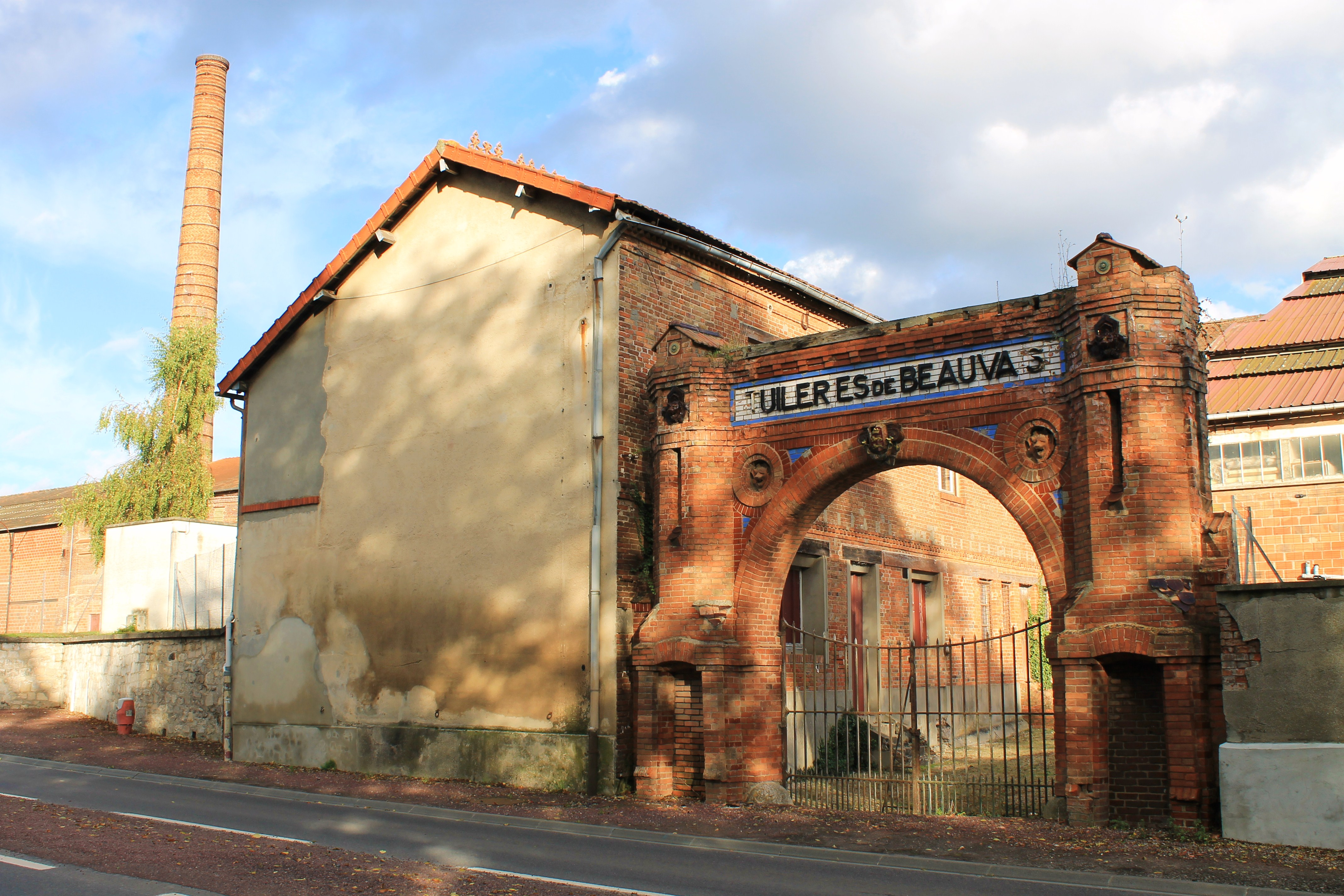
The entrance to the Tuileries de Beauvais

== Activities and events ==
The association of rural families organizes dance classes for children and adults (beginners, modern dance, Fit'n dance).

== Notable people linked to the commune ==
- Dominique Lemesle (1951-2007): Assistant Football Referee - 1st French Division (1979-1982)
- François Fayt (1946-): composer.
- Yohann Eudeline (1982-), French footballer who played at the local football club until 2000.

== See also ==
- Communes of the Calvados department
