= Operation Cobra =

American offensive in the Western Theater of World War II

- Part of Operation Overlord
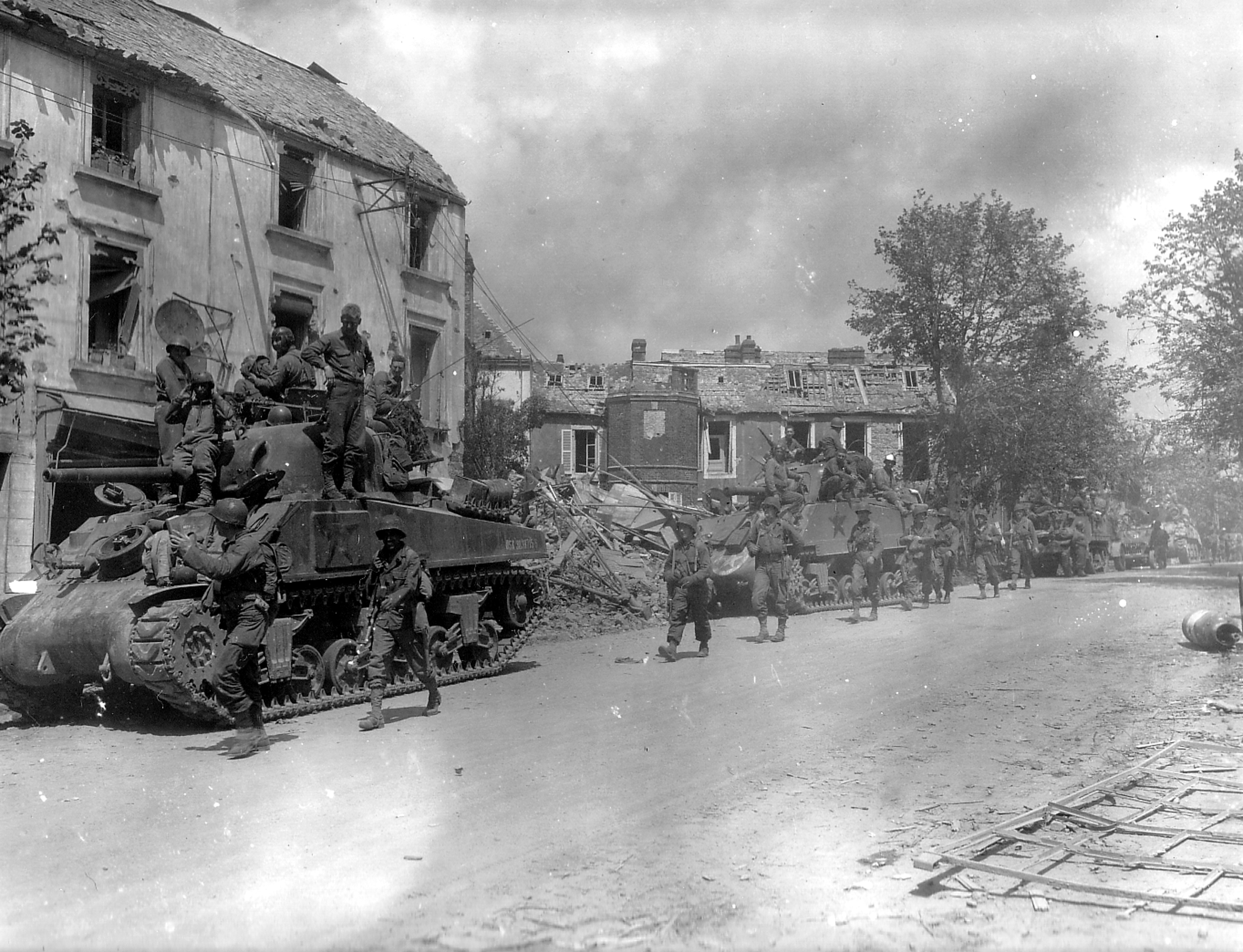
- M4 Sherman tanks and infantrymen of the U.S. 4th Armored Division in Coutances
Date	25–31 July 1944
Location	Saint-Lô, Normandy, France 49°06′55″N 1°05′25″W
Result	Allied victory

Belligerents
United States; United Kingdom	Germany

Commanders and leaders
(United Kingdom) Bernard Montgomery (United States) Omar Bradley	(Nazi Germany) Günther von Kluge (Nazi Germany) Paul Hausser

Units involved
First Army: VII Corps; 2nd Armored Div.; 3rd Armored Div.; 1st Infantry Div.; 9th Infantry Div.; 30th Infantry Div.; VIII Corps; 4th Armored Div.; 6th Armored Div.	(Nazi Germany) Seventh Army: (Nazi Germany) II Para. Corps; 5th Para. Div.; 2nd Panzer Div.; Panzer Lehr Div.; (Nazi Germany) LXXXIV Corps; 2nd SS Pz. Div.; 17th SS Pzgr. Div.; 116th Panzer Div.; 352nd Inf. Div.

Strength
8 infantry divisions 3 armored divisions 2,451 tanks and tank destroyers	2 infantry divisions 1 parachute division 4 understrength Panzer divisions 1 Panzergrenadier division 190 tanks and assault guns

Casualties and losses
18,450 casualties (5,020+ killed) at least 109 medium tanks destroyed or damaged unknown number of light tanks and tank destroyers	25 July: 2,500+ killed 26-30 July: 1,500 killed, wounded, missing; 4,000 captured 144 tanks & self-propelled guns destroyed/abandoned 2,447 soft-skinned vehicles destroyed/abandoned 252 artillery pieces destroyed/abandoned

Operation Cobra was an offensive launched by the First United States Army under Lieutenant General Omar Bradley seven weeks after the D-Day landings, during the Normandy campaign of World War II. The intention was to take advantage of the distraction of the Germans by the sustained British and Canadian attacks around Caen, and thereby break through the German defenses that were penning in their forces, while the Germans were unbalanced. Once a corridor had been created, the First Army would then be able to advance into Brittany, rolling up the German flanks once free of the constraints of the bocage country. After a slow start, the offensive gathered momentum and German resistance collapsed as scattered remnants of broken units fought to escape to the Seine. Lacking the resources to cope with the situation, the German response was ineffectual and the entire Normandy front soon collapsed. Operation Cobra, together with concurrent offensives by the British Second Army and the Canadian First Army, was decisive in securing an Allied victory in the Normandy campaign.

Having been delayed several times by poor weather, Operation Cobra commenced on 25 July 1944, with a concentrated aerial bombardment from thousands of Allied aircraft. The bombardments resulted in friendly fire casualties, including Lieutenant General Lesley J. McNair who was on the front line as an observer. Supporting offensives had drawn the bulk of German armored reserves toward the British and Canadian sector and, coupled with the general lack of men and materiel available to the Germans, it was impossible for them to form successive lines of defense. Units of the U.S. VII Corps led the initial two-division assault, while other First U.S. Army corps mounted supporting attacks designed to pin German units in place. Progress was slow on the first day but opposition started to crumble once the defensive crust had been broken. By 27 July, most organized resistance had been overcome and the VII and VIII Corps advanced rapidly, isolating the Cotentin Peninsula.

By 31 July, XIX Corps had destroyed the last forces opposing the First Army, which emerged from the bocage and liberated Avranches. Reinforcements were moved west by Field Marshal Günther von Kluge and employed in various counterattacks, the largest of which, Unternehmen Lüttich (Operation Liège), was launched on 7 August between Mortain and Avranches. Although this led to the bloodiest phase of the battle, it was mounted by already exhausted and understrength units and was a costly failure. On 8 August, troops of the newly activated Third United States Army captured the city of Le Mans, formerly the German 7th Army headquarters. Operation Cobra transformed the high-intensity infantry combat of Normandy into rapid maneuver warfare and led to the creation of the Falaise pocket and the loss of the German strategic position in northwestern France.

== Background ==
Following the successful Allied invasion of Normandy on 6 June 1944, progress inland was slow. To facilitate the Allied build-up in France and to secure room for further expansion, the deep water port of Cherbourg on the western flank of the U.S. sector and the historic town of Caen in the British and Canadian sector to the east, were early objectives. The original plan for the Normandy campaign envisioned strong offensive efforts in both sectors, in which the Second Army (Lieutenant-General Sir Miles Dempsey) would secure Caen and the area south of it and the First U.S. Army (Lieutenant General Omar Bradley) would "wheel round" to the Loire valley.

General Sir Bernard Montgomery—commanding all Allied ground forces in Normandy—intended Caen to be taken on D-Day, while Cherbourg was expected to fall 15 days later. The Second Army was to seize Caen and then form a front to the southeast, extending to Caumont-l'Éventé, to acquire airfields and protect the left flank of the First U.S. Army as it moved on Cherbourg. Possession of Caen and its surroundings—desirable for open terrain that would permit maneuver warfare—would also give the Second Army a suitable staging area for a push south to capture Falaise, which could be used as the pivot for a swing east to advance on Argentan and then the Touques River. The capture of Caen has been described by the British official historian Lionel Ellis as the most important D-Day objective assigned to the British I Corps (Lieutenant-General John Crocker). Ellis and Chester Wilmot called the Allied plan "ambitious" since the Caen sector contained the strongest defenses in Normandy. (Note: "The quick capture of that key city [Caen] and the neighborhood of Carpiquet was the most ambitious, the most difficult and the most important task of Lieutenant-General J. T. Crocker's I Corps". Wilmot wrote "The objectives given to Crocker's seaborne divisions were decidedly ambitious, since his troops were to land last, on the most exposed beaches, with the farthest to go, against what was potentially the greatest opposition".)

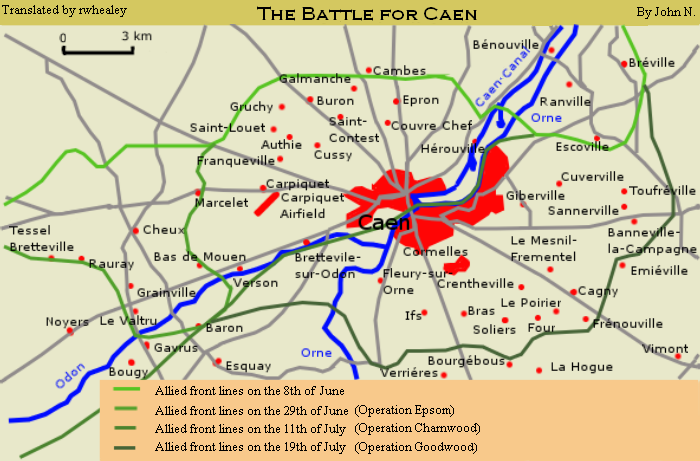
Anglo-Canadian offensives in the Caen area after D-Day

The initial attempt by I Corps to reach the city on D-Day was blocked by elements of the 21st Panzer Division and with the Germans committing most of the reinforcements sent to meet the invasion to the defense of Caen, the Anglo-Canadian front rapidly congealed short of the Second Army's objectives. (Note: These included the bulk of the available armored reserves: the 1st SS Panzer Division Leibstandarte SS Adolf Hitler, the 12th SS Panzer Division Hitlerjugend and the Panzer-Lehr-Division.) Operation Perch in the week following D-Day and Operation Epsom (26–30 June) brought some territorial gains and depleted its defenders but Caen remained in German hands until Operation Charnwood (7–9 July), when the Second Army managed to take the northern part of the city up to the River Orne in a frontal assault.

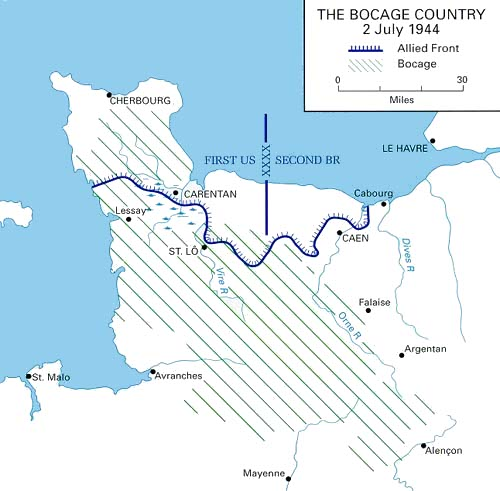
Overview of relative locations of upcoming Anglo-Canadian operations Goodwood and Atlantic at Caen, drawing German troops and ordnance, and the area of upcoming Operation Cobra at St-Lo

The successive Anglo-Canadian offensives around Caen kept the best of the German forces in Normandy, including most of the armor, to the eastern end of the Allied lodgement but even so the First U.S. Army made slow progress against dogged German resistance. In part, operations were slow due to the constraints of the bocage landscape of densely packed banked hedgerows, sunken lanes and small woods, for which U.S. units had not trained. With no ports in Allied hands, all reinforcement and supply had to take place over the beaches via the two Mulberry harbors and were at the mercy of the weather.

On 19 June, a severe storm descended on the English Channel, lasting for three days and causing significant delays to the Allied build-up and the cancellation of some operations. The First U.S. Army advance in the western sector was eventually halted by Bradley before the town of Saint-Lô, to concentrate on the seizure of Cherbourg. The defense of Cherbourg consisted largely of four German battlegroups formed from the remnants of units that had retreated up the Cotentin Peninsula, but the port defenses had been designed principally to meet an attack from the sea. Organized German resistance finally ended on 27 June, when the U.S. 9th Infantry Division managed to reduce the defenses of Cap de la Hague, north-west of the port. Within four days, VII Corps (Major General J. Lawton Collins) resumed the offensive toward Saint-Lô, alongside XIX Corps and VIII Corps, causing the Germans to move more armor into the U.S. sector.

== Planning ==
The originator of the idea for Operation Cobra is disputed. According to Montgomery's official biographer, the foundation of Operation Cobra was laid on 13 June. Planning was immensely aided by detailed Ultra intelligence which supplied up-to-date decodes of communications between Oberkommando der Wehrmacht (OKW, the German armed forces high command) and Hitler's generals. Montgomery's plan at that time called for the U.S. First Army to take Saint-Lô and Coutances and then make two southward thrusts; one from Caumont toward Vire and Mortain and the other from Saint-Lô toward Villedieu and Avranches. Although pressure was to be kept up along the Cotentin Peninsula towards La Haye-du-Puits and Valognes, the capture of Cherbourg was not the priority. With the capture of Cherbourg by VII Corps on 27 June, Montgomery's initial timetable was overtaken by events and the thrust from Caumont was never adopted.

The month of July saw the Normandy front in deadlock as two German armies faced of with two Allied armies. The Germans spent the start of July in turmoil as a comprehensive reshuffling of command was underway and casualties doubled. The Wehrmacht could scarcely replace it mounting losses compared to the Allies.

Following the conclusion of Operation Charnwood and the cancellation of the First Army offensive towards Saint-Lô, Montgomery met with Bradley and Dempsey on 10 July to discuss plans for the 21st Army Group. Bradley said that progress on the western flank was very slow but that plans had been laid for another breakout attempt, codenamed Operation Cobra, to be launched by the First Army on 18 July. (Note: By 10 July, Bradley had become concerned enough to write that the Allies faced the possibility of a World War I-type stalemate in the campaign.) Montgomery approved the plan and that the strategy would remain the diversion of German attention from the First Army to the British and Canadian sector. Dempsey was instructed to "go on hitting, drawing the German strength, especially the armour, onto yourself—so as to ease the way for Brad". To accomplish this, Operation Goodwood was planned and Eisenhower ensured that both operations would have the support of the Allied strategic bombers.

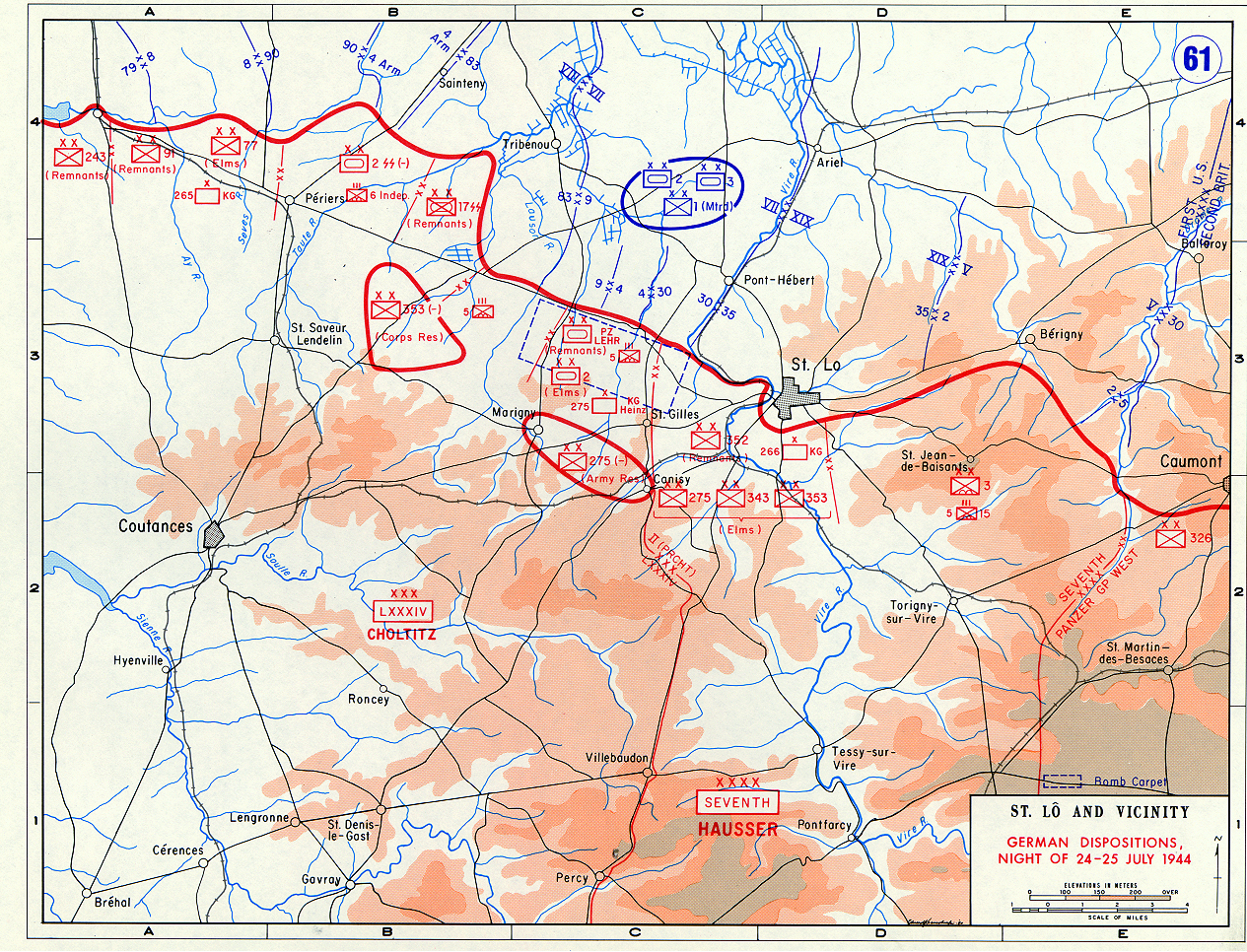
German dispositions, night of 24–25 July 1944

On 12 July, Bradley briefed his commanders on the Cobra plan, which consisted of three phases. The main effort would be under the control of VII Corps. In the first phase, the breakthrough attack would be conducted by the 9th Infantry Division (Major General Manton S. Eddy) and the 30th Infantry Division (Major General Leland Hobbs), which would break into the German defensive zone and then hold the flanks of the penetration while the 1st Infantry Division (Major General Clarence Huebner) and 2nd Armored Division (Major General Edward H. Brooks) pushed into the depth of the position until resistance collapsed. The 1st Infantry Division "was to take Marigny, with this objective exploited by a stream of General Watson's 3rd Armored Division armor that would move south toward Coutances". The 2nd Armored Division—part of "Collins' exploitation force" of the 2nd Armored Division in the east of the VII Corps sector and the "1st Infantry Division reinforced by Combat Command B (CCB) of the 3rd Armored division in the west"—would "pass through the 30th Infantry Division sector ... and guard the overall American left flank." If VII Corps succeeded, the western German position would become untenable, permitting a relatively easy advance to the southwest end of the bocage to cut off and seize the Brittany peninsula. First Army intelligence estimated that no German counterattack would occur in the first few days after Cobra's launch and that if they did later, they would be no more than battalion-sized operations.

Cobra was to be a concentrated attack on a 6,400 m (7,000 yd) front, unlike previous U.S. broad front offensives and would have a mass of air support. Fighter-bombers would concentrate on hitting forward German defenses in a 230 m (250 yd) belt immediately south of the Saint-Lô–Periers road, while General Spaatz's heavy bombers would bomb to a depth of 2,300 m (2,500 yd) behind the German main line of resistance. It was anticipated that the physical destruction and shock value of a short, intense preliminary bombardment would greatly weaken the German defense so in addition to divisional artillery, Army- and Corps-level units would provide support, including nine heavy, five medium and seven light artillery battalions. More than a thousand divisional and corps artillery pieces were committed to the offensive and approximately 140,000 artillery rounds were allocated to the operation in VII Corps, with another 27,000 for VIII Corps.

To overcome the constraints of the bocage that had made attacks so difficult and costly for both sides, Rhino modifications were made to some M4 Sherman, M5A1 Stuart tanks and M10 tank destroyers, by fitting them with hedge-breaching 'tusks' that could force a path through hedgerows. German tanks remained restricted to the roads but U.S. armored vehicles could maneuver more freely, although the effectiveness of the devices was exaggerated. By the eve of Cobra, 60 percent of the tanks of the First Army had the rhino modification. To preserve operational security, Bradley forbade their use until Cobra was launched. In all, 1,269 M4 medium tanks, 694 M5A1 light tanks and 288 M10 tank destroyers were available.

=== Supporting operations ===
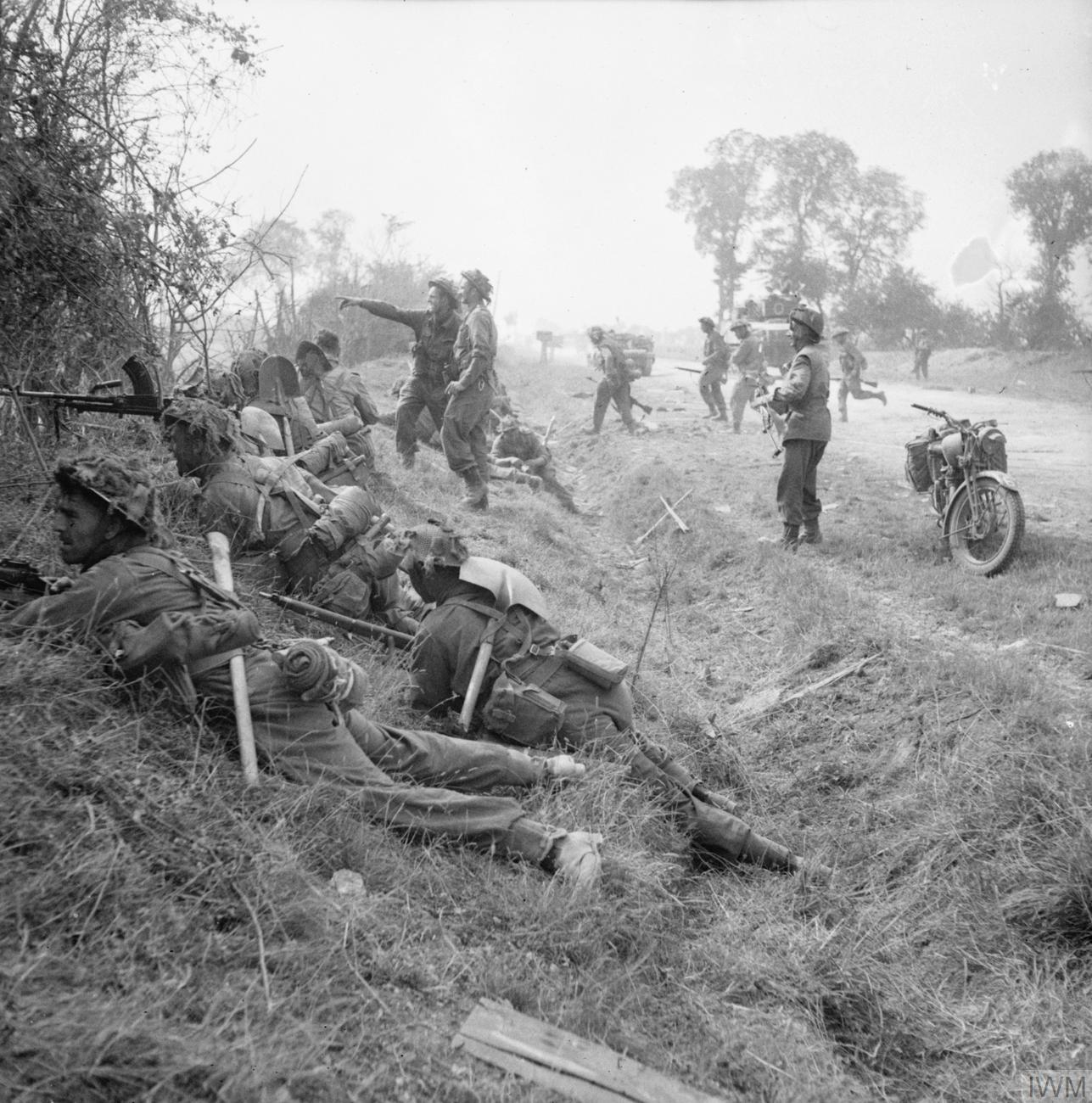
Men of the 1st Battalion, Welsh Guards, part of the 32nd Guards Brigade of the Guards Armoured Division, in action near Cagny, 19 July 1944

On 18 July, the British VIII and I Corps—to the east of Caen—launched Operation Goodwood. The offensive began with the largest air bombardment in support of ground forces yet, with more than 1,000 aircraft dropping 6,000 short tons (5,400 t) of high explosive and fragmentation bombs from low altitude. German positions to the east of Caen were shelled by 400 artillery pieces and many villages were reduced to rubble but German artillery further to the south, on the Bourguébus Ridge, was outside the range of the British artillery and the defenders of Cagny and Émiéville were largely unscathed by the bombardment. This contributed to the losses suffered by Second Army, which sustained over 4,800 casualties. (Note: I Corps suffered 3,817 casualties and VIII Corps suffered 1,020 casualties.) Principally an armored offensive in order to conserve infantry manpower, between 250 and 400 British tanks were put out of action, (Note: Reynolds claims that a careful study of the relevant documents indicate a maximum tank loss of 253 tanks during Goodwood, most of which were repairable but Buckley claims 21st Army Group lost around 400 tanks during the operation, although he too notes that most were eventually recovered.) although recent examination suggests that only 140 were completely destroyed with an additional 174 damaged. The operation remains the largest tank battle ever fought by the British Army and resulted in the expansion of the Orne bridgehead and the capture of the portion of Caen on the south bank of the Orne.

Simultaneously, the II Canadian Corps on the western flank of Goodwood began Operation Atlantic to strengthen the Allied foothold along the banks of the Orne river and take Verrières Ridge to the south of Caen. Atlantic made initial gains but ran out of steam as casualties mounted. Having cost the Canadians 1,349 men and with the heavily defended ridge firmly in German hands, Atlantic was closed down on 20 July. At Montgomery's urging, "strongly underlined in the Supreme Commander's communications to Montgomery", the II Canadian Corps commander, Lieutenant-General Guy Simonds, began a second offensive a few days later, codenamed Operation Spring. This offensive, which began the same day that Operation Cobra was launched (25 July), had the limited but important aim of tying down German units to prevent them from being transferred to the U.S. sector, although Simonds took the opportunity to make another bid for Verrières Ridge. Again the fighting for Verrières Ridge proved extremely bloody for the Canadians, with 25 July marking the costliest day for a Canadian battalion—The Black Watch (Royal Highland Regiment) of Canada—since the Dieppe Raid of 1942. A counterstroke by two German divisions pushed the Canadians back past their start lines and Simonds had to commit reinforcements to stabilize the front.

Operations Goodwood, Atlantic, and Spring caused the Germans to commit most of their armor and reinforcements to the eastern sector. In particular, Operation Spring, despite its cost, drew the 9th SS Panzer Division away from the U.S. sector on the eve of Operation Cobra. Only two Panzer divisions with 190 tanks now faced the U.S. First Army. Seven Panzer divisions with 750 tanks were around Caen, far away from Operation Cobra, as were all the heavy Tiger tank battalions and the three Nebelwerfer brigades in Normandy. According to American military historian Robert M. Citino, British and Canadian troops had been instrumental in enabling the US army to conduct Cobra as their "seemingly endless series of offensives toward Caen twisted the German defenses into an unbalanced, even distorted shape. Even in failure Montgomery kept the vast majority of the German Panzers away from the Americans."

== Allied offensive ==
=== Preliminary attacks ===
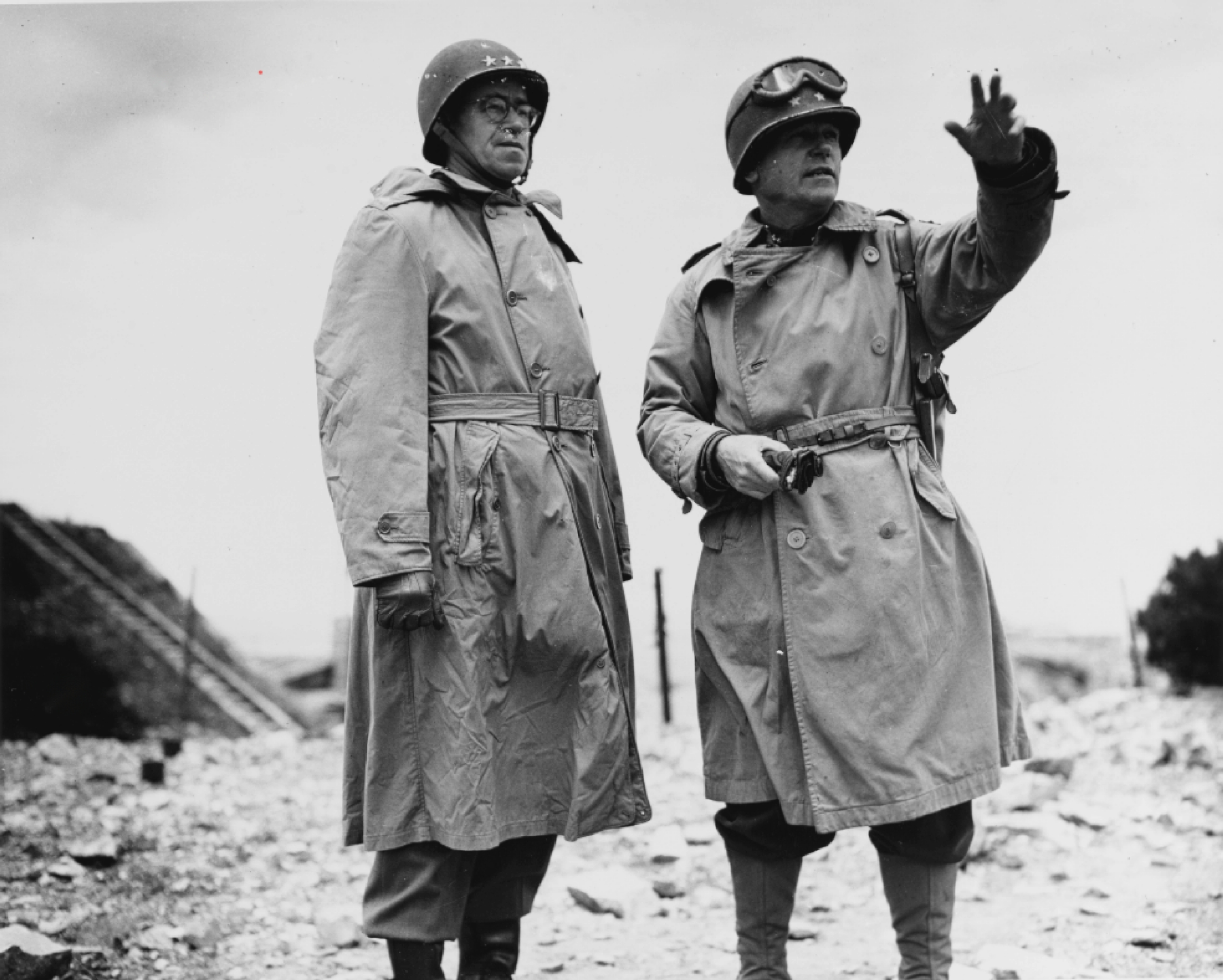
Bradley and Collins near Cherbourg

To gain good terrain for Operation Cobra, Bradley and Collins conceived a plan to push forward to the Saint-Lô–Periers road, along which VII and VIII Corps were securing jumping-off positions. On 18 July, at a cost of 5,000 casualties, the U.S. 29th and 35th Infantry Divisions managed to gain the vital heights of Saint-Lô, driving back General der Fallschirmtruppen Eugen Meindl's II Parachute Corps. Meindl's paratroopers, together with the 352nd Infantry Division (which had been in action since its D-Day defense of Omaha Beach) were now in ruins, and the stage for the main offensive was set. Due to poor weather conditions that had also been hampering Goodwood and Atlantic, Bradley decided to postpone Cobra for a few days—a decision that worried Montgomery, as the British and Canadian operations had been launched to support a breakout attempt that was failing to materialize. By 24 July the skies had cleared enough for the start order to be given, and 1,600 Allied aircraft took off for Normandy. However, the weather closed in again over the battlefield. Under poor visibility conditions, more than 25 Americans were killed and 130 wounded in the bombing before the air support operation was postponed until the following day. Some enraged soldiers opened fire on their own aircraft, a not uncommon practice in Normandy when suffering from friendly fire.

=== Main attack and breakthrough 25–27 July ===
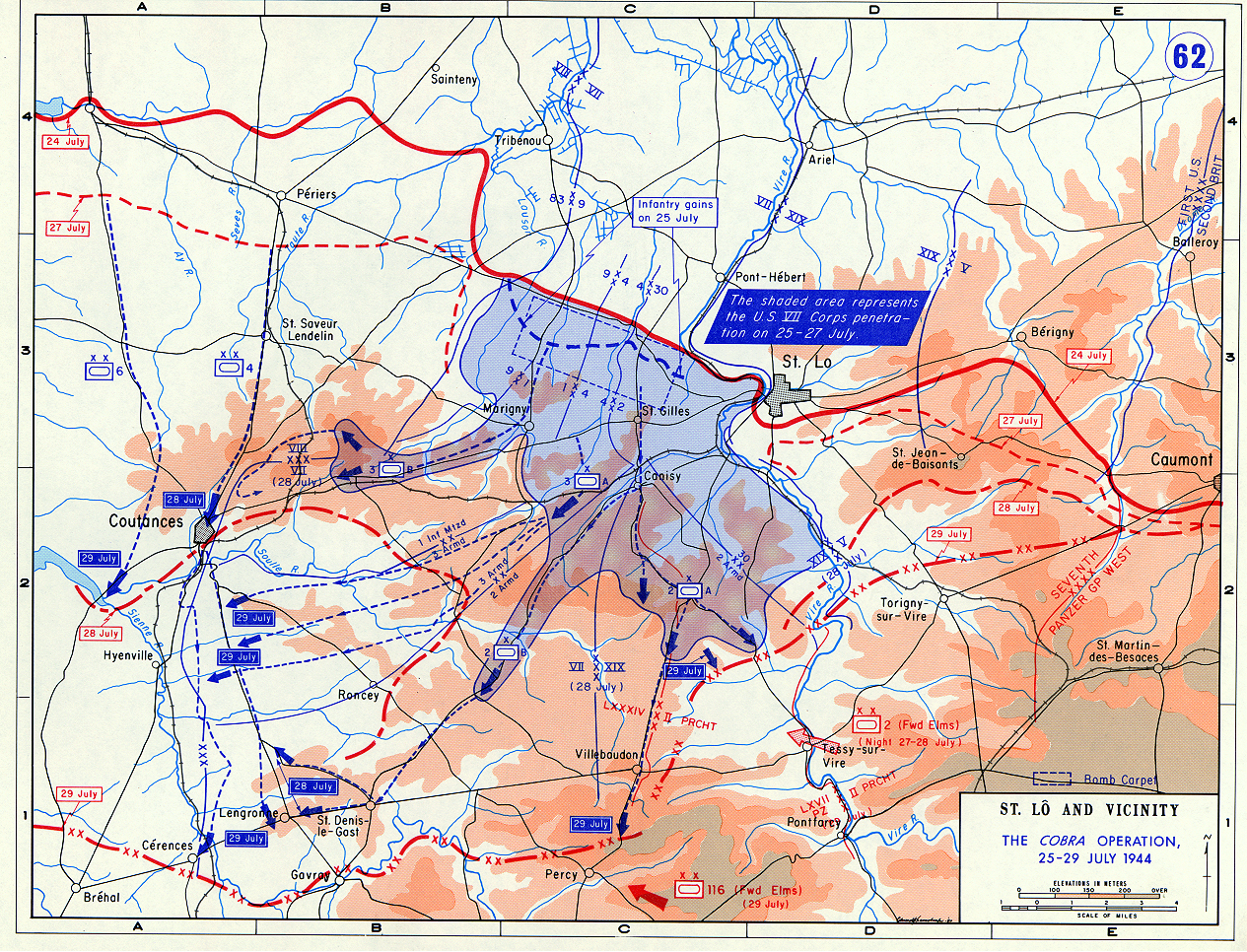
Operation Cobra, 25–29 July 1944

Propaganda leaflets during the attack on Marigny on 25 July, 1944

After the one-day postponement, Cobra got underway at 09:38 on 25 July, when around 600 Allied fighter-bombers attacked strongpoints and enemy artillery along a 270 m (300 yd)-wide strip of ground located in the St. Lô area. For the next hour, 1,800 heavy bombers of the U.S. Eighth Air Force saturated a 6,000 yd × 2,200 yd (3.4 mi × 1.3 mi; 5.5 km × 2.0 km) area on the Saint-Lô–Periers road, succeeded by a third and final wave of medium bombers. Approximately 3,000 U.S. aircraft carpet-bombed a narrow section of the front, with the Panzer-Lehr-Division taking the brunt of the attack. However, once again not all the casualties were German; Bradley had specifically requested that the bombers approach the target from the east, out of the sun and parallel to the Saint-Lô–Periers road, in order to minimize the risk of friendly losses, but most of the airmen instead came in from the north, perpendicular to the front line. Bradley, however, had apparently misunderstood explanations from the heavy bomber commanders that a parallel approach was impossible because of the time and space constraints Bradley had set. Additionally, a parallel approach would not in any event have assured that all bombs would fall behind German lines because of deflection errors or obscured aim points due to dust and smoke. Despite efforts by U.S. units to identify their positions, inaccurate bombing by the Eighth Air Force killed 111 men and wounded 490. The dead included Lieutenant General Lesley McNair, who was with the 2nd Battalion, 120th Infantry as an observer as part of the deception plan Operation Quicksilver. McNair was the highest-ranking U.S. soldier to be killed in action in the European Theater of Operations.

By 11:00, the infantry began to move forward, advancing from crater to crater beyond what had been the German outpost line. Although no serious opposition was forecast, the remnants of Fritz Bayerlein's Panzer Lehr—consisting of roughly 2,200 men and 45 armored vehicles—had regrouped and were prepared to meet the advancing U.S. troops, and to the west of Panzer Lehr the German 5th Parachute Division had escaped the bombing almost intact. Collins' VII Corps were quite disheartened to meet fierce enemy artillery fire, which they expected to have been suppressed by the bombing. Several U.S. units found themselves entangled in fights against strongpoints held by a handful of German tanks, supporting infantry and 88 mm (3.46 in) guns—VII Corps gained only 2,000 m (2,200 yd) during the rest of the day. However, if the first day's results had been disappointing, General Collins found cause for encouragement; although the Germans were fiercely holding their positions, these did not seem to form a continuous line and were susceptible to being outflanked or bypassed. Even with prior warning of the U.S. offensive, the British and Canadian actions around Caen had convinced the Germans that the real threat lay there, and tied down their available forces to such an extent that a succession of meticulously prepared defensive positions in depth, as encountered during Goodwood and Atlantic, were not created to meet Cobra.

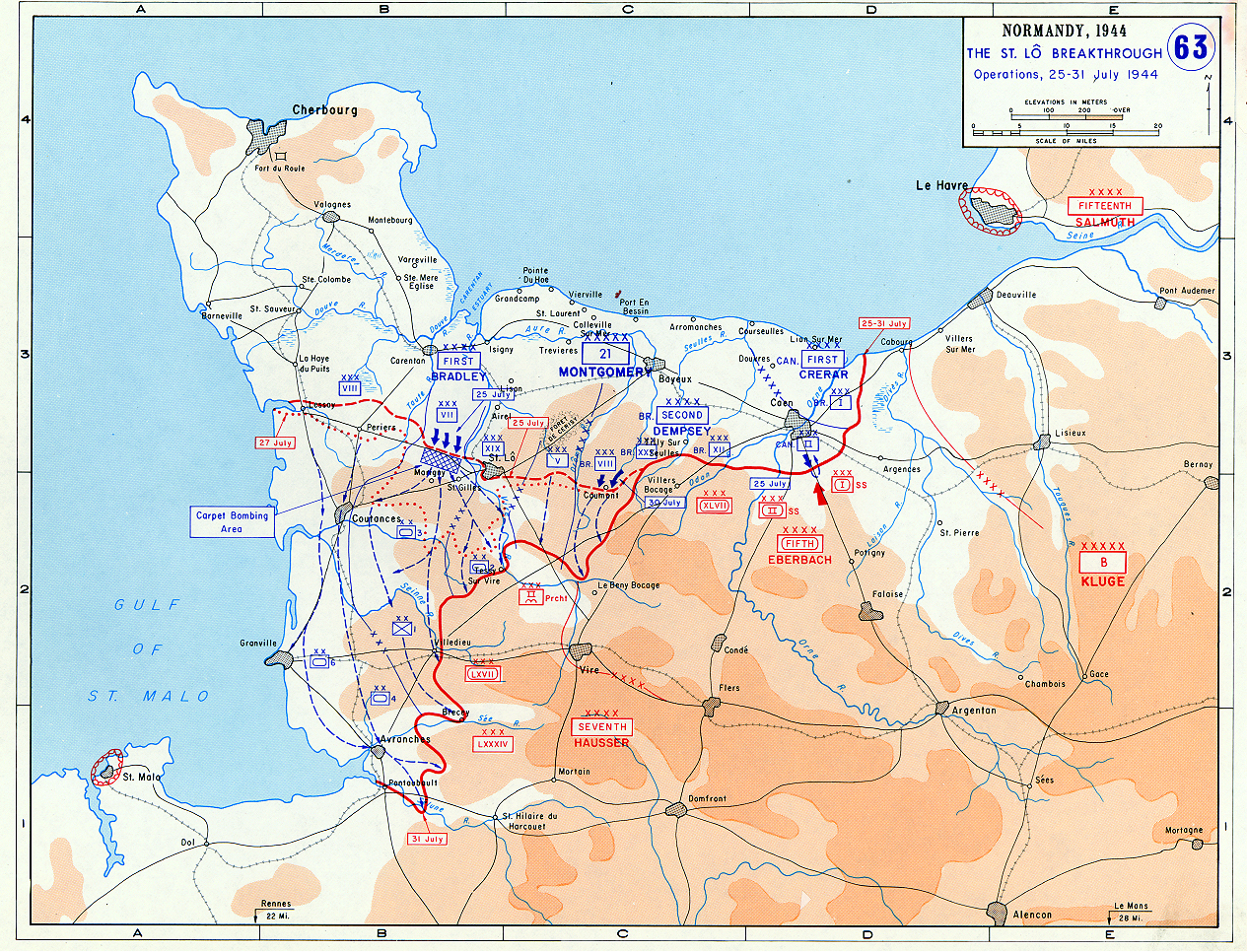
The St. Lô breakthrough, 25–31 July

On the morning of 26 July, the U.S. 2nd Armored Division and the 1st Infantry Division joined the attack as planned, reaching one of Cobra's first objectives—a road junction north of Le Mesnil-Herman—the following day. Also on 26 July, VIII Corps (Major General Troy H. Middleton) entered the battle, led by the 8th U.S. Infantry Division and 90th U.S. Infantry Division. Despite clear paths of advance through the floods and swamps across their front, both divisions initially disappointed the First Army by failing to gain significant ground but first light the next morning revealed that the Germans had been compelled to retreat by their crumbling left flank, leaving only immense minefields to delay VIII Corps. By noon on 27 July, the U.S. 9th Infantry Division was also clear of any organized German resistance and was advancing rapidly.

=== Breakout and advance 28–30 July ===
By 28 July, the German defenses across the U.S. front had largely collapsed under the full weight of the VII and VIII Corps advance and resistance was disorganized and patchy. The 4th Armored Division (VIII Corps)—entering combat for the first time—captured Coutances but met stiff opposition east of the town and U.S. units penetrating into the depth of the German positions were counter-attacked by elements of the 2nd SS Panzer Division, 17th SS Panzergrenadier Division and the 353rd Infantry Division, seeking to escape entrapment. Around Roncey, P-47 Thunderbolts of the 405th Fighter Group destroyed a German column of 122 tanks, 259 other vehicles and 11 artillery pieces. An attack by British Hawker Typhoon fighter-bombers close to La Baleine destroyed nine tanks, eight other armored vehicles and twenty other vehicles. German remnants mounted a counter-attack against the U.S. 2nd Armored Division but this was a disaster and the Germans abandoned their vehicles and fled on foot. Two columns of the 2nd SS Panzer Division were mauled by the U.S. 2nd Armored Division. A column around La Chapelle was bombarded at point blank range by 2nd Armored Division artillery. In two hours, U.S. artillery fired over 700 rounds, into the column. The Germans suffered the loss of 50 dead, 60 wounded and 197 taken prisoner. Material losses were over 260 German combat vehicles destroyed. Beyond the town another 1,150 German soldiers were killed and the Germans lost 96 armored combat vehicles and trucks. The U.S. 2nd Armored Division destroyed 64 German tanks and 538 other German combat vehicles during Operation Cobra. The U.S. 2nd Armored Division suffered 49 tank losses in the process. The 2nd Armored Division also inflicted over 7,370 casualties on the Germans while suffering 914 casualties.

At the beginning of Operation Cobra the German Panzer Lehr Division had only 2,200 combat troops, 12 Panzer IV and 16 Panthers fit for action and 30 tanks in various states of repair behind the lines. Panzer Lehr was in the path of Allied bombing that consisted of 1,500 bombers. The division suffered about 1,000 casualties during this bombardment. An exhausted and demoralized Bayerlein reported that his Panzer Lehr Division, which had been ground down in the fighting against the British in June and before moving to the American front and suffering further losses around St Lo at start of July, was "finally annihilated", with its armor wiped out, its personnel either casualties or missing and all headquarters records lost.

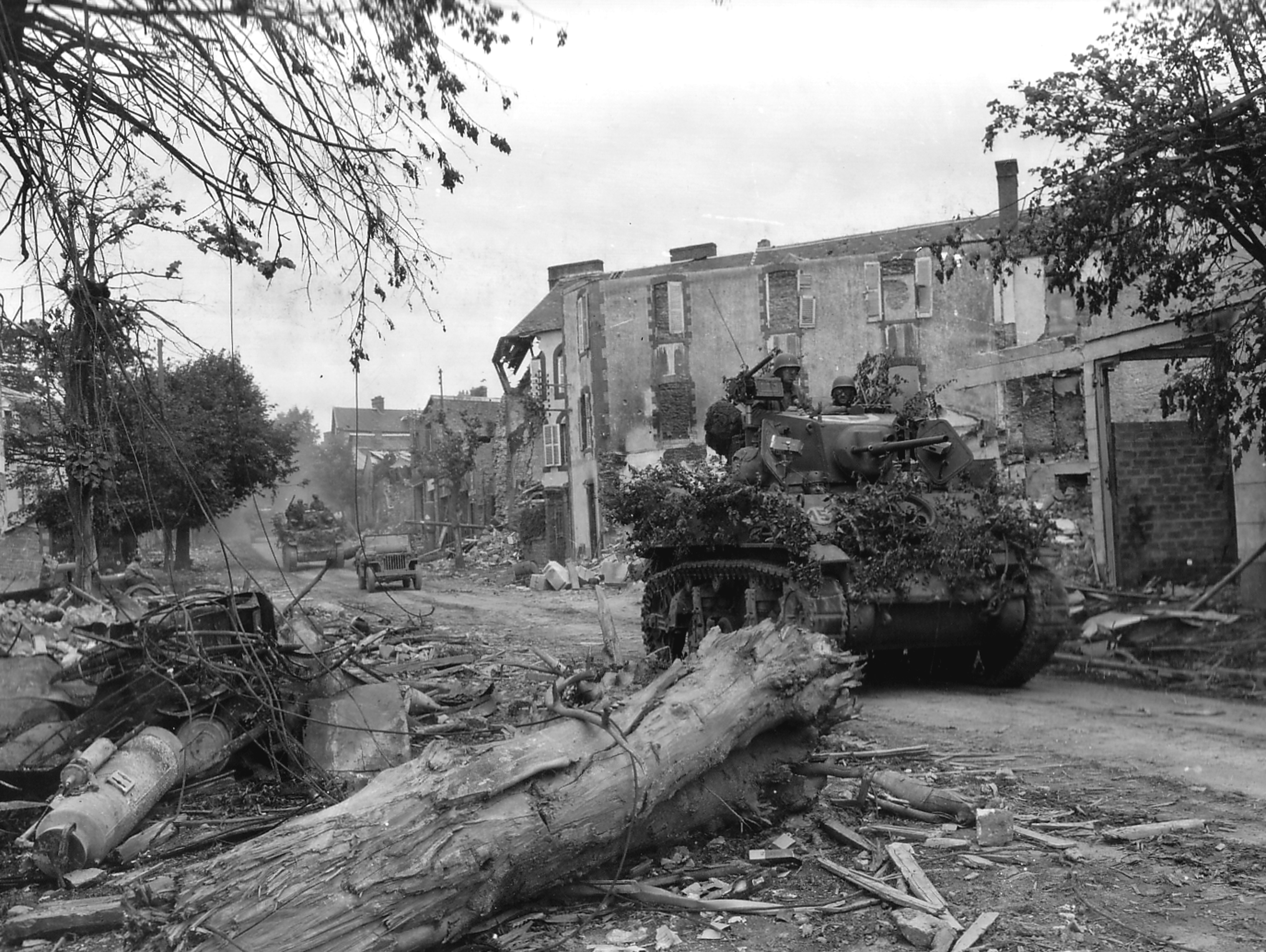
U.S. M5A1 Stuart light tank of the 4th Armored Division (VIII Corps) in Coutances

Field Marshal Günther von Kluge Oberbefehlshaber West (commander of German forces on the Western Front) was mustering reinforcements, and elements of the 2nd Panzer Division and the 116th Panzer Division were approaching the battlefield. The U.S. XIX Corps (Major General Charles H. Corlett) entered the battle on 28 July on the left of VII Corps and between 28 and 31 July became embroiled with these reinforcements in the fiercest fighting since Cobra began. During the night of 29/30 July near Saint-Denis-le-Gast, to the east of Coutances, elements of the 2nd Armored Division found themselves fighting for their lives against a German column from the 2nd SS Panzer Division and 17th SS Panzergrenadier Division, which passed through the U.S. lines in the darkness. Other elements of the 2nd Armored Division were attacked near Cambry and fought for six hours; Bradley and his commanders knew that they were dominating the battlefield and such desperate assaults were no threat to the U.S. position. When ordered to concentrate his division, Colonel Heinz Günther Guderian the senior staff officer of the 116th Panzer Division was frustrated by the high level of Allied fighter-bomber activity. Without receiving direct support from the 2nd Panzer Division as promised, Guderian stated that his panzergrenadiers could not succeed in a counterattack against the Americans. Advancing southward along the coast, later that day, the U.S. VIII Corps seized the town of Avranches—described by historian Andrew Williams as "the gateway to Brittany and southern Normandy"—and by 31 July XIX Corps had thrown back the last German counterattacks after fierce fighting, inflicting heavy losses in men and tanks. The U.S. advance was now relentless, and the First Army was finally free of the bocage.

=== Operation Bluecoat, 30 July – 7 August ===
On 30 July, to protect Cobra's flank and prevent the disengagement and relocation of further German forces, VIII Corps and XXX Corps of the British Second Army began Operation Bluecoat southwards from Caumont toward Vire and Mont Pinçon. Bluecoat kept German armored units fixed on the British eastern front and continued the wearing down of the strength of German armored formations in the area. The breakthrough in the center of the Allied front surprised the Germans, when they were distracted by the Allied attacks at both ends of the Normandy bridgehead. By the time of the U.S. breakout at Avranches, there was little to no reserve strength left for Unternehmen Lüttich, which had been defeated by 12 August, leaving the 7th Army with no choice but to retire rapidly east of the Orne river, with a rearguard of the remaining armored and motorized units, to allow time for the surviving infantry to reach the Seine. After the first stage of the withdrawal beyond the Orne, the maneuver collapsed for a lack of fuel, Allied air attacks and the constant pressure of the Allied armies, culminating in the encirclement of German forces in the Falaise pocket.

== Aftermath ==
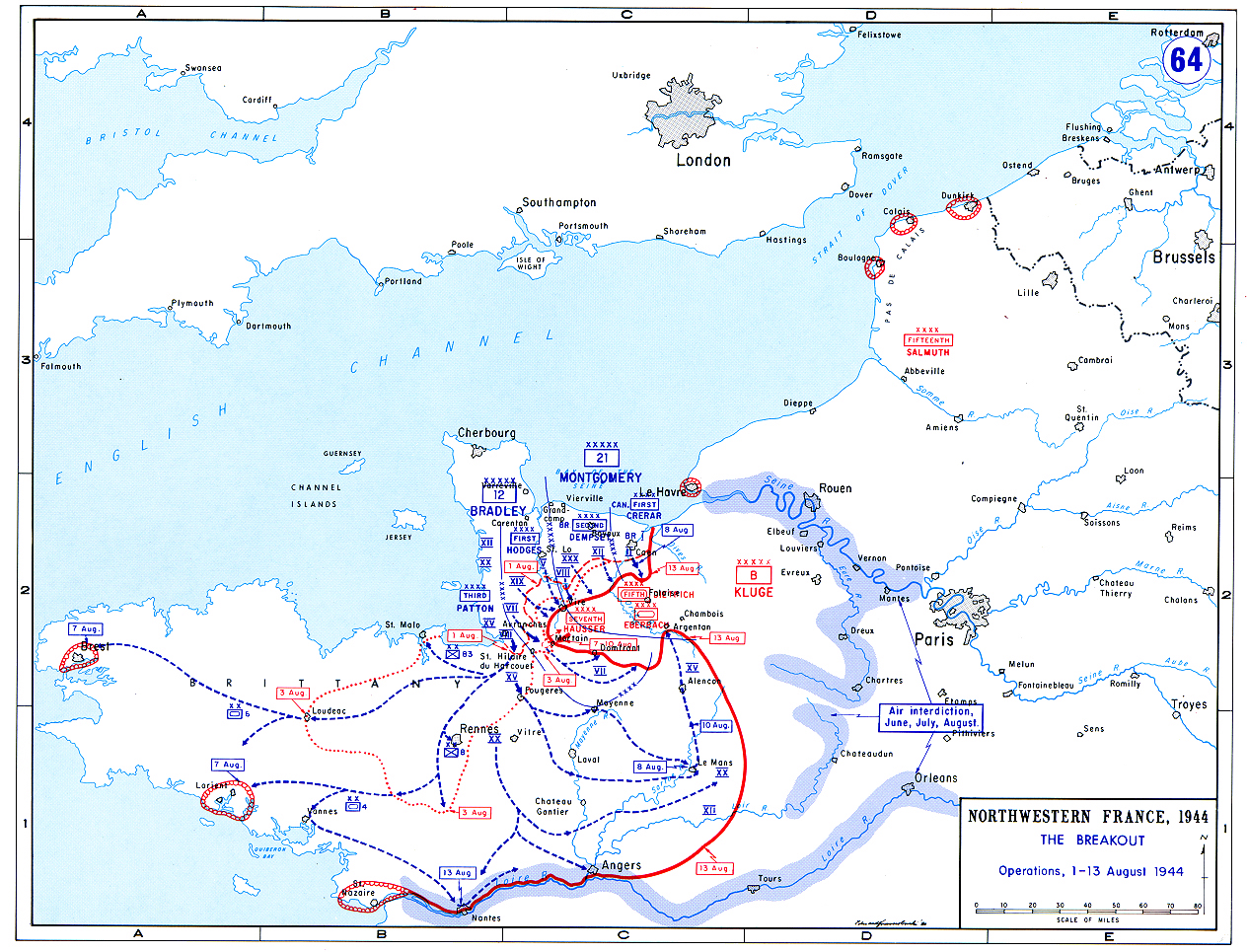
Map showing the breakout from the Normandy beachhead

At noon on 1 August, the U.S. Third Army was activated under the command of Lieutenant General George S. Patton. Lieutenant General Courtney Hodges assumed command of the First Army and Bradley was promoted to the overall command of both armies, named the U.S. 12th Army Group. Patton wrote a poem containing the words,

So let us do real fighting, boring in and gouging, biting.
Let's take a chance now that we have the ball.
Let's forget those fine firm bases in the dreary shell raked spaces,
Let's shoot the works and win! Yes, win it all!

The U.S. advance following Cobra was extraordinarily rapid. Between 1 and 4 August, seven divisions of Patton's Third Army had swept through Avranches and over the bridge at Pontaubault into Brittany. The Westheer (German army in the west) had been reduced to such a poor state by the Allied offensives that, with no prospect of reinforcement in the wake of Operation Bagration, the Soviet summer offensive against Army Group Centre, very few Germans believed they could now avoid defeat. Rather than order his remaining forces to withdraw to the Seine, Adolf Hitler sent a directive to von Kluge demanding "an immediate counterattack between Mortain and Avranches" (Unternehmen Lüttich) to "annihilate" the enemy and make contact with the west coast of the Cotentin peninsula. Eight of the nine Panzer divisions in Normandy were to be used in the attack but only four (one of them incomplete) could be relieved from their defensive tasks and assembled in time. German commanders immediately protested that such an operation was impossible given their remaining resources but these objections were overruled and the counter-offensive commenced, on 7 August around Mortain. The 2nd, 1st SS and 2nd SS Panzer Divisions led the assault, although with only 75 Panzer IVs, 70 Panthers and 32 self-propelled guns. Hopelessly optimistic, the offensive was over within 24 hours, although fighting continued until 13 August.

By 8 August, the city of Le Mans—former headquarters of the German 7th Army—had fallen to the Americans. With von Kluge's few remaining battleworthy formations destroyed by the First Army, the Allied commanders realized that the entire German position in Normandy was collapsing. Bradley declared:

This is an opportunity that comes to a commander not more than once in a century. We're about to destroy an entire hostile army and go all the way from here to the German border.

On 14 August, in conjunction with U.S. movements northward to Chambois, Canadian forces launched Operation Tractable; the Allied intention was to trap and destroy the German 7th Army and 5th Panzer Army near the town of Falaise. Five days later, the two arms of the encirclement were almost complete; the advancing U.S. 90th Infantry Division had made contact with the Polish 1st Armored Division and the first Allied units crossed the Seine at Mantes Gassicourt, while German units were fleeing eastward by any means they could find. By 22 August, the Falaise Pocket—which the Germans had been fighting desperately to keep open to allow their trapped forces to escape—was finally sealed, ending the Battle of Normandy with a major Allied victory. All German forces west of the Allied lines were now dead or in captivity and although perhaps 100,000 German troops escaped they left behind 40,000–50,000 prisoners and more than 10,000 dead. A total of 344 tanks and self-propelled guns, 2,447 soft-skinned vehicles, and 252 artillery pieces were found abandoned or destroyed in the northern sector of the pocket. The Allies were able to advance freely through undefended territory and by 25 August all four Allied armies (First Canadian, Second British, First U.S., and Third U.S.) involved in the Normandy campaign were on the river Seine.
