= Bellengreville =

Bellengreville is the name of several communes in France:

- Bellengreville, Calvados
- Bellengreville, Seine-Maritime
