= Janville =

Janville is the name or part of the name of several communes in France:

- Janville, Calvados, in the Calvados département
- Janville, Eure-et-Loir, in the Eure-et-Loir département
- Janville, Oise, in the Oise département
- Janville-sur-Juine, in the Essonne département
