= Cléville, Calvados =

Cléville
- Commune
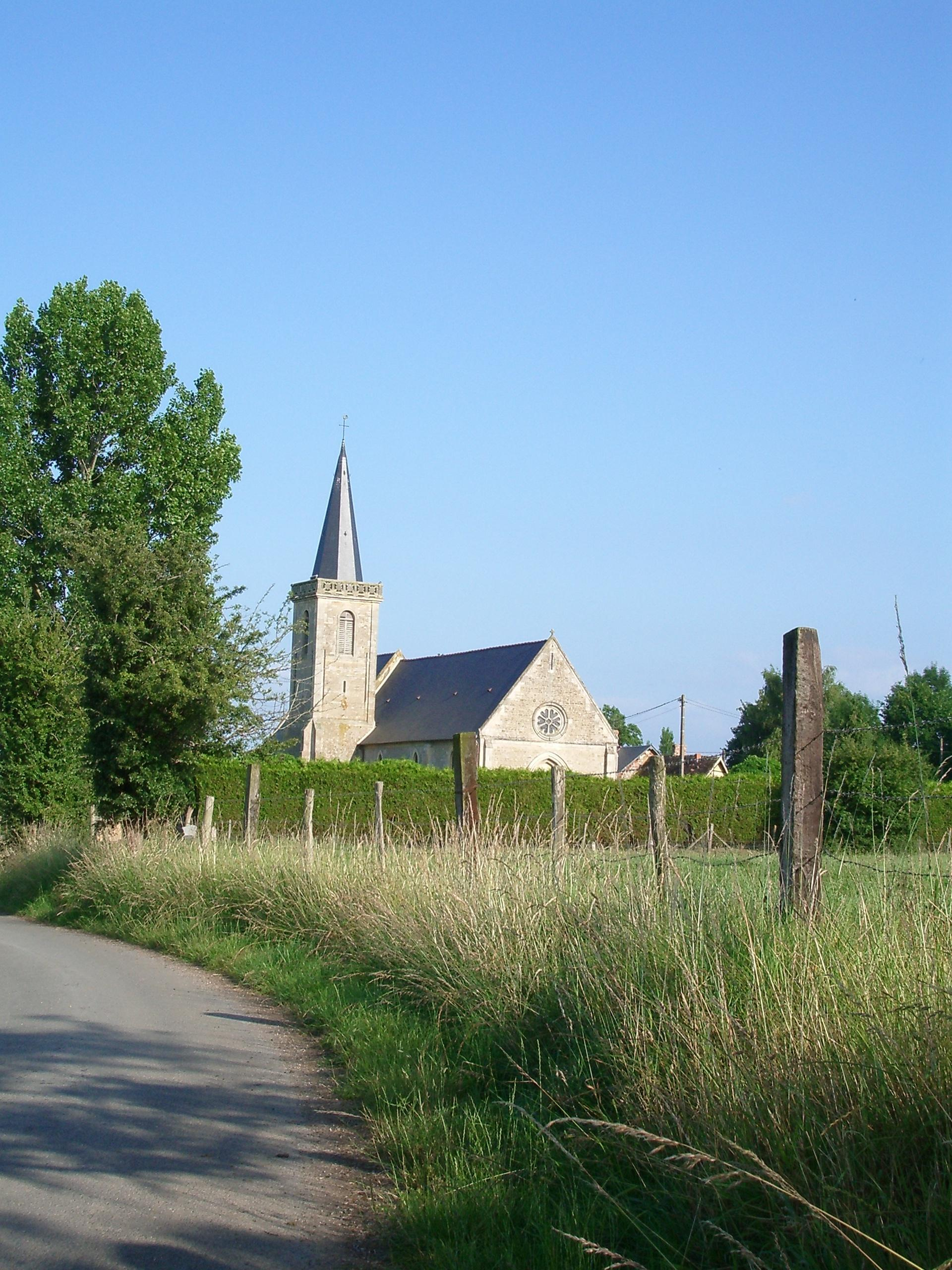
- The church in Cléville

- Coat of arms
- Location of Cléville
- Location within France Location within Normandy
- Coordinates: 49°09′24″N 0°05′29″W
- Country: France
- Region: Normandy
- Department: Calvados
- Arrondissement: Caen
- Canton: Troarn
- Intercommunality: CC Val ès Dunes

Government
  - Mayor (2020–2026): Michel Cruchon
- Area^{1}: 8.53 km^{2} (3.29 sq mi)
- Elevation: 26 m (85 ft)
- Highest elevation: 43 m (141 ft)
- Lowest elevation: 2 m (6.6 ft)
- Population (2023): 389
  - Density: 45.6/km^{2} (118/sq mi)
- Time zone: UTC+01:00 (CET)
  - Summer (DST): UTC+02:00 (CEST)
- INSEE/Postal code: 14163 /14370
- ^{1} French Land Register data, which excludes lakes, ponds, glaciers > 1 km^{2} (0.386 sq mi or 247 acres) and river estuaries.

Cléville (French pronunciation: [klevil]) is a commune in the Calvados department in the Normandy region in northwestern France.

== Population ==
Historical population
Year	Pop.	±% p.a.
1968	223	—
1975	215	−0.52%
1982	242	+1.70%
1990	298	+2.64%
1999	269	−1.13%
2007	335	+2.78%
2012	361	+1.51%
2017	372	+0.60%
2023	389	+0.75%
Source: INSEE

== See also ==
- Communes of the Calvados department
