= Communauté de communes Val ès Dunes =

Intercommunal structure in Normandy, France

Val ès Dunes
- Communauté de communes
- Map of Val ès Dunes
- Coordinates: 49°07′N 00°09′W
- Country: France
- Region: Normandy
- Department: Calvados
- No. of communes: {{{nbcomm}}}
- Established: 2017

Government
  - President: Philippe Pesquerel
- Area: 179 km^{2} (69 sq mi)
- Population (2021): 18,851
  - Density: 105/km^{2} (273/sq mi)
- Website: www.valesdunes.fr

Val ès Dunes is the intercommunal structure centered on the town of Argences. It is located in the Calvados Department in the region of Normandy, northwestern France. It was created in 2017, its seat is in Argences. It has an area of 179.0 square kilometers. In 2021 it had 18,851 inhabitants, with 3,848 people living in Argences.

== Composition ==
Val ès Dunes comprises the following communes:

1. Argences
2. Banneville-la-Campagne
3. Bellengreville
4. Cagny
5. Canteloup
6. Cesny-aux-Vignes
7. Cléville
8. Condé-sur-Ifs
9. Émiéville
10. Frénouville
11. Janville
12. Moult-Chicheboville
13. Ouézy
14. Saint-Ouen-du-Mesnil-Oger
15. Saint-Pair
16. Saint-Pierre-du-Jonquet
17. Saint-Sylvain
18. Valambray
19. Vimont
