= Canton of Troarn =

Coordinates: 49.18°N 0.18°W

- Canton
- Situation of the canton of Troarn in the department of Calvados
- Country: France
- Region: Normandy
- Department: Calvados
- No. of communes: {{{nbcomm}}}
- Population (2023): 31,138
- INSEE code: 1424

The canton of Troarn is an administrative division of the Calvados department, northwestern France. Its borders were modified at the French canton reorganisation which came into effect in March 2015. Its seat is in Troarn.

It consists of the following communes:

1. Argences
2. Banneville-la-Campagne
3. Bellengreville
4. Cagny
5. Canteloup
6. Cesny-aux-Vignes
7. Cléville
8. Cuverville
9. Démouville
10. Émiéville
11. Escoville
12. Frénouville
13. Janville
14. Moult-Chicheboville
15. Ouézy
16. Saint-Ouen-du-Mesnil-Oger
17. Saint-Pair
18. Saint-Pierre-du-Jonquet
19. Saint-Samson
20. Sannerville
21. Troarn
22. Touffréville
23. Valambray
24. Vimont
