= Saint-Ouen-du-Mesnil-Oger =

- Commune
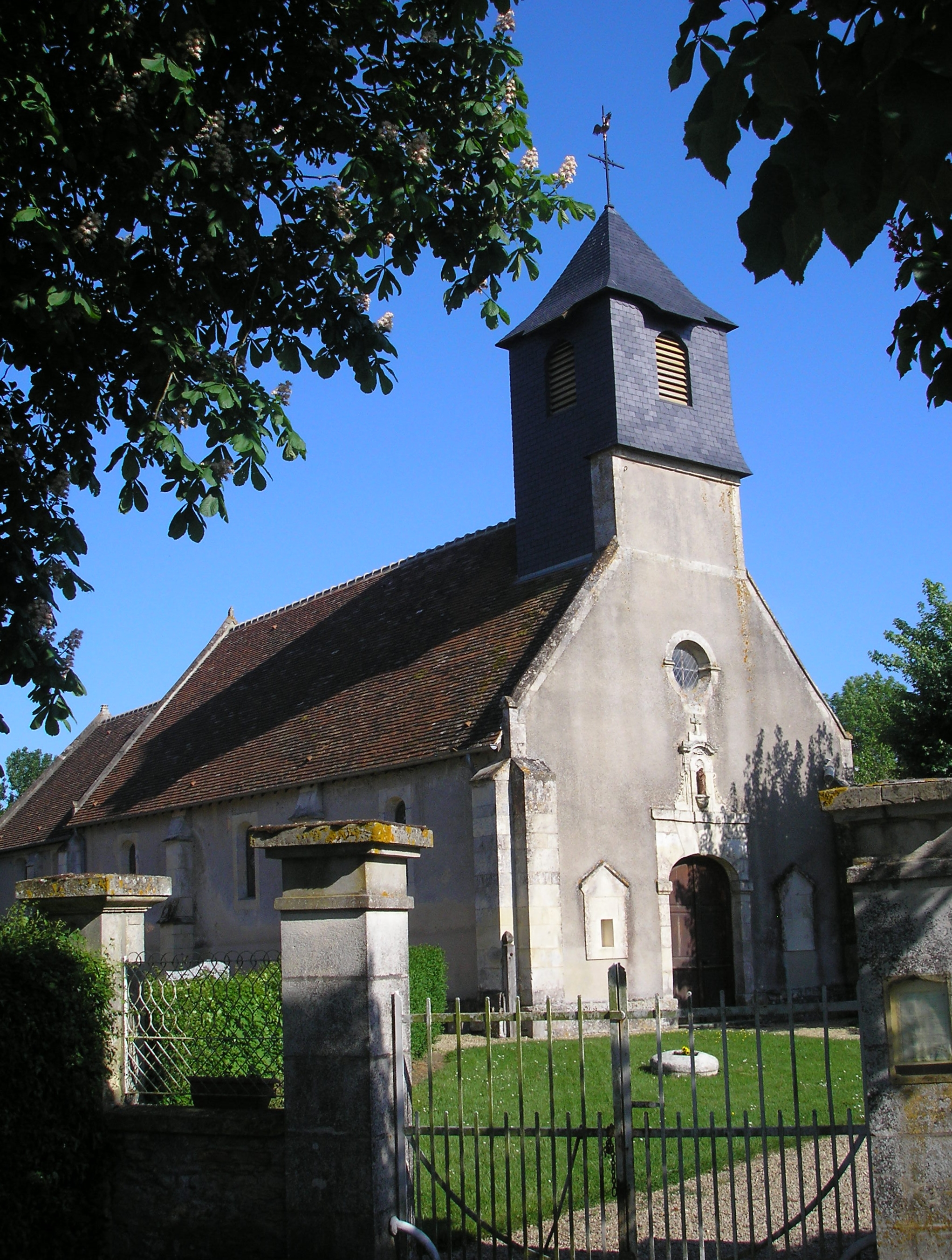
- The church in Saint-Ouen-du-Mesnil-Oger
- Location of Saint-Ouen-du-Mesnil-Oger
- Location within France Location within Normandy
- Coordinates: 49°09′25″N 0°07′14″W
- Country: France
- Region: Normandy
- Department: Calvados
- Arrondissement: Caen
- Canton: Troarn
- Intercommunality: CC Val ès Dunes

Government
  - Mayor (2020–2026): Michel Bizet
- Area^{1}: 5.89 km^{2} (2.27 sq mi)
- Elevation: 29 m (95 ft)
- Highest elevation: 35 m (115 ft)
- Lowest elevation: 4 m (13 ft)
- Population (2023): 233
  - Density: 39.6/km^{2} (102/sq mi)
- Time zone: UTC+01:00 (CET)
  - Summer (DST): UTC+02:00 (CEST)
- INSEE/Postal code: 14637 /14670
- ^{1} French Land Register data, which excludes lakes, ponds, glaciers > 1 km^{2} (0.386 sq mi or 247 acres) and river estuaries.

Saint-Ouen-du-Mesnil-Oger (French pronunciation: [sɛ̃t‿wɛ̃ dy menil ɔʒe]) is a commune in the Calvados department in the Normandy region in northwestern France.

== Population ==
Historical population
Year	Pop.	±% p.a.
1968	164	—
1975	127	−3.59%
1982	121	−0.69%
1990	146	+2.38%
1999	147	+0.08%
2007	165	+1.45%
2012	210	+4.94%
2017	208	−0.19%
2023	233	+1.91%
Source: INSEE

== See also ==
- Communes of the Calvados department
