= Cagny, Calvados =

Cagny
- Commune
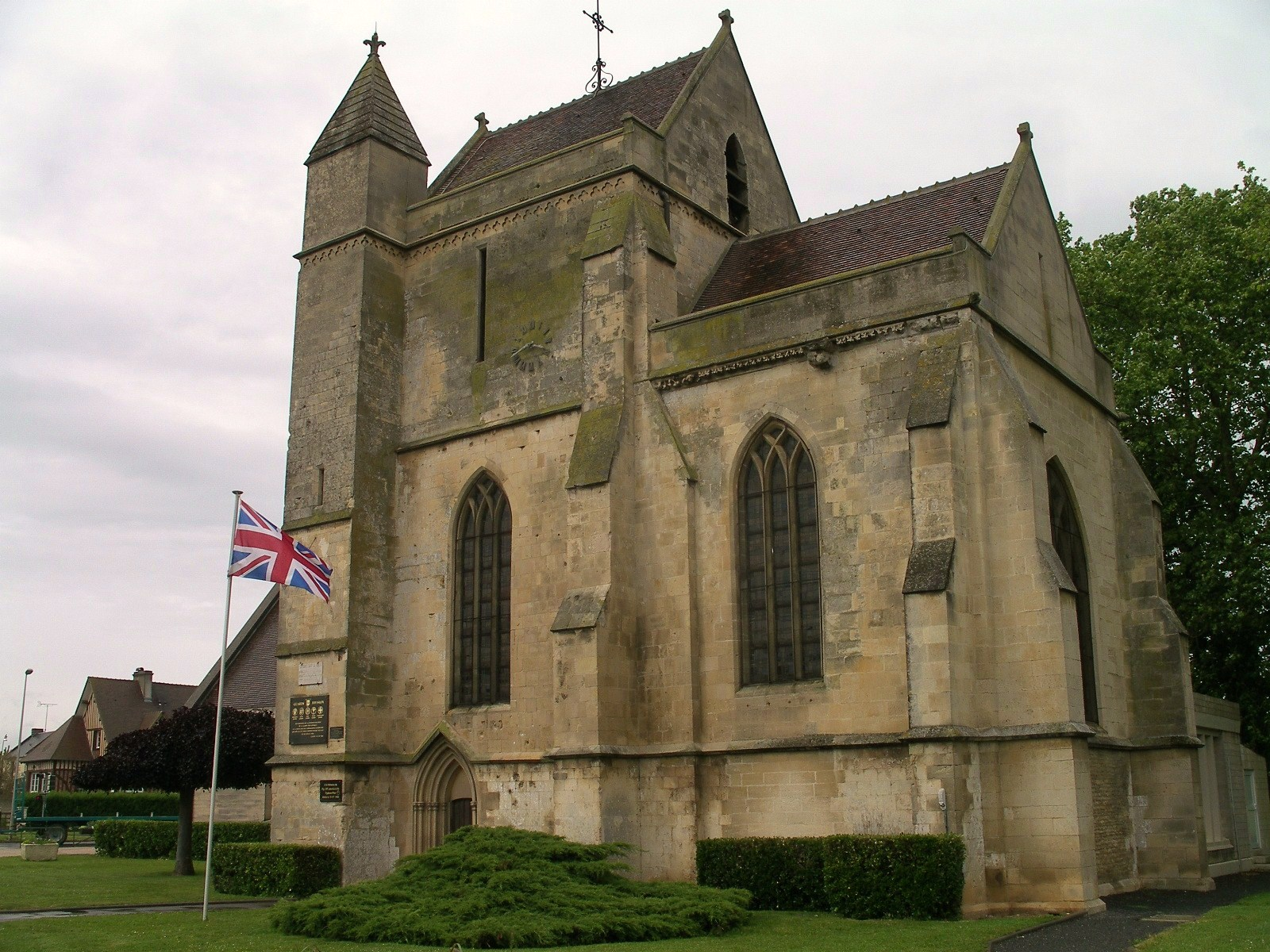
- The church in Cagny

- Coat of arms
- Location of Cagny
- Location within France Location within Normandy
- Coordinates: 49°08′46″N 0°15′25″W
- Country: France
- Region: Normandy
- Department: Calvados
- Arrondissement: Caen
- Canton: Troarn
- Intercommunality: CC Val ès Dunes

Government
  - Mayor (2020–2026): Eric Margerie
- Area^{1}: 8.46 km^{2} (3.27 sq mi)
- Elevation: 22 m (72 ft)
- Highest elevation: 32 m (105 ft)
- Lowest elevation: 13 m (43 ft)
- Population (2023): 2,066
  - Density: 244/km^{2} (632/sq mi)
- Time zone: UTC+01:00 (CET)
  - Summer (DST): UTC+02:00 (CEST)
- INSEE/Postal code: 14119 /14630
- ^{1} French Land Register data, which excludes lakes, ponds, glaciers > 1 km^{2} (0.386 sq mi or 247 acres) and river estuaries.

Cagny (French pronunciation: [kaɲi]) is a commune in the Calvados department in the Normandy region in northwestern France.

== Geography ==
The commune is made up of the following collection of villages and hamlets, Le Mesnil Frémentel and Cagny.

== Population ==
Historical population
Year	Pop.	±% p.a.
1968	1,021	—
1975	994	−0.38%
1982	878	−1.76%
1990	1,650	+8.21%
1999	1,592	−0.40%
2007	1,483	−0.88%
2012	1,469	−0.19%
2017	1,910	+5.39%
2023	2,066	+1.32%
Source: INSEE

== Points of Interest ==
=== National Heritage sites ===
The Commune has two buildings and areas listed as a Monument historique

- Église Saint-Germain fourteenth century church listed as a monument in 1913.
- Former priory of Notre-Dame-des-Moutiers Remains of an eleventh century priory, was listed as a monument in 1974.

== Twin towns – sister cities ==
Cagny is twinned with:

- Pirbright, Surrey, England. Since 1992

== See also ==
- Communes of the Calvados department
