= Bellengreville, Calvados =

Bellengreville
- Commune
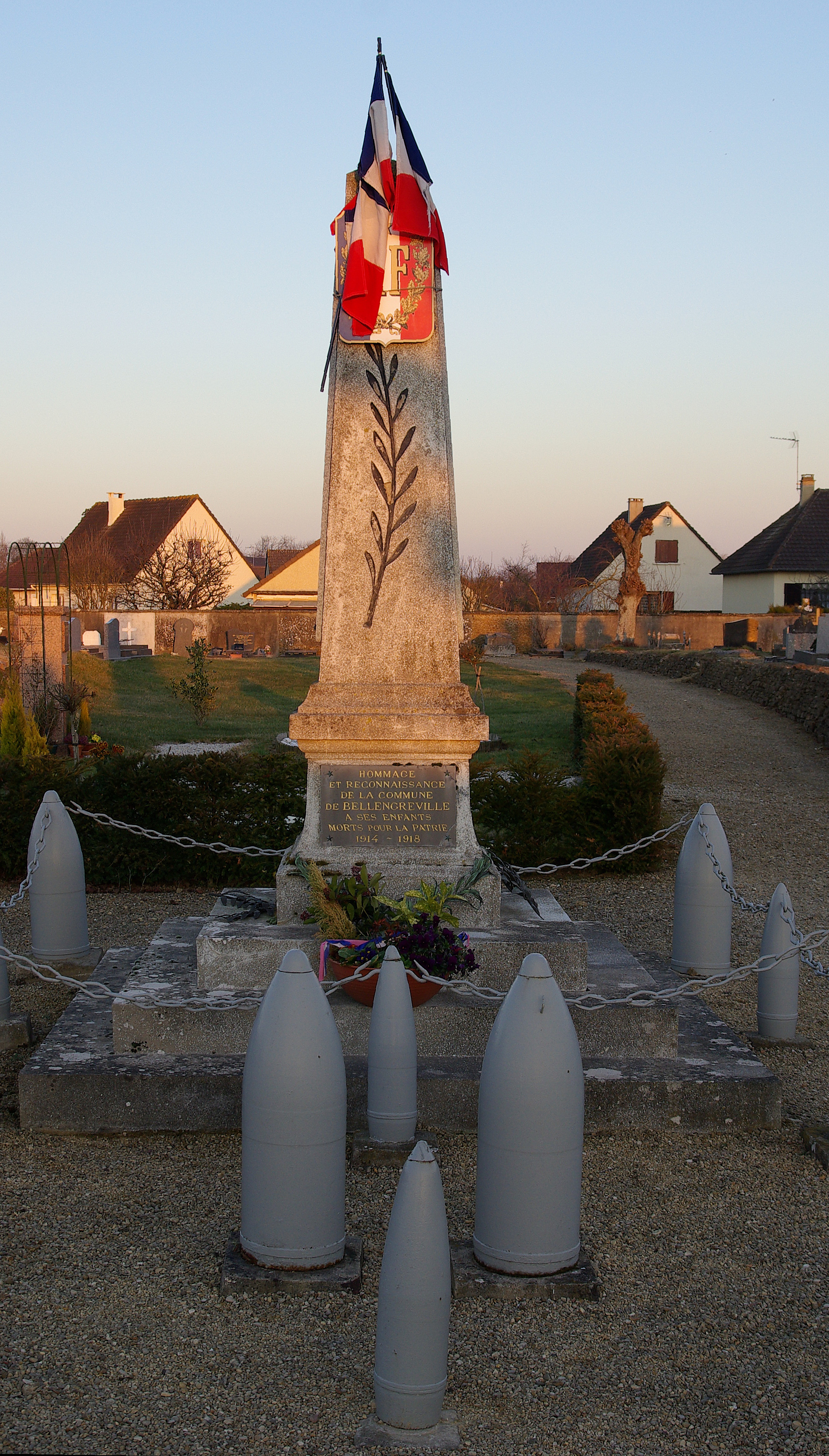
- War memorial
- Location of Bellengreville
- Location within France Location within Normandy
- Coordinates: 49°07′32″N 0°12′36″W
- Country: France
- Region: Normandy
- Department: Calvados
- Arrondissement: Caen
- Canton: Troarn
- Intercommunality: CC Val ès Dunes

Government
  - Mayor (2020–2026): Dominique Piat
- Area^{1}: 10.15 km^{2} (3.92 sq mi)
- Elevation: 70 m (230 ft)
- Highest elevation: 73 m (240 ft)
- Lowest elevation: 6 m (20 ft)
- Population (2023): 1,598
  - Density: 157.4/km^{2} (407.8/sq mi)
- Time zone: UTC+01:00 (CET)
  - Summer (DST): UTC+02:00 (CEST)
- INSEE/Postal code: 14057 /14370
- ^{1} French Land Register data, which excludes lakes, ponds, glaciers > 1 km^{2} (0.386 sq mi or 247 acres) and river estuaries.

Bellengreville (French pronunciation: [bɛlɑ̃ɡʁəvil]) is a commune in the Calvados department in the Normandy region in northwestern France.

== Geography ==
The commune is made up of the following collection of villages and hamlets, Franqueville, Le Bas de Bellengreville and Bellengreville.

The Ruisseau des Petits Marais stream flows through the commune.

== Population ==
Historical population

Year	Pop.	±% p.a.
1793	437	—
1861	455	+0.06%
1911	310	−0.76%
1962	482	+0.87%
1968	511	+0.98%
1975	498	−0.37%
1982	780	+6.62%

Year	Pop.	±% p.a.
1990	1,391	+7.50%
1999	1,412	+0.17%
2007	1,496	+0.72%
2012	1,574	+1.02%
2017	1,493	−1.05%
2023	1,598	+1.14%

Source: EHESS and INSEE

== Points of Interest ==
- Chicheboville-Bellengreville marsh is a 154 hectare Natura 2000 conservation site, shared with the neighbouring commune of Moult-Chicheboville. It is home to the Great raft spider a protected species that is officially listed as Vulnerable.

=== National Heritage sites ===
The Commune has two buildings and areas listed as a Monument historique

- Église Notre Dame twelfth century church listed as a monument in 1932.
- Manoir de la Perquette a seventeenth century Manor house listed as a monument in 1980.

== See also ==
- Communes of the Calvados department
