= Saint-Samson, Calvados =

Saint-Samson
- Commune
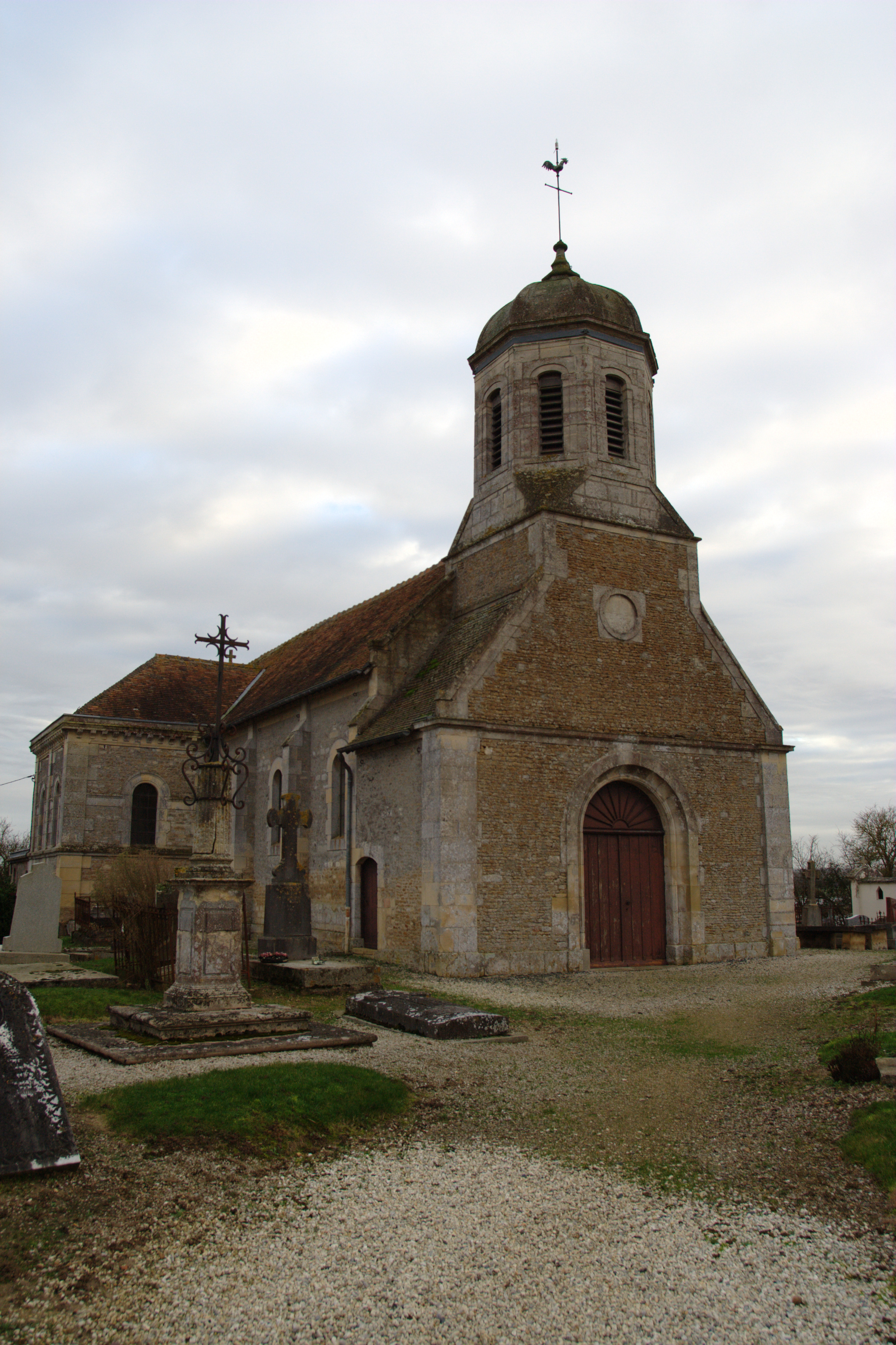
- The church in Saint-Samson

- Coat of arms
- Location of Saint-Samson
- Location within France Location within Normandy
- Coordinates: 49°11′07″N 0°09′30″W
- Country: France
- Region: Normandy
- Department: Calvados
- Arrondissement: Lisieux
- Canton: Troarn
- Intercommunality: CC Normandie-Cabourg-Pays d'Auge

Government
  - Mayor (2020–2026): Daniel Roussel
- Area^{1}: 3.66 km^{2} (1.41 sq mi)
- Elevation: 19 m (62 ft)
- Highest elevation: 45 m (148 ft)
- Lowest elevation: 2 m (6.6 ft)
- Population (2023): 307
  - Density: 83.9/km^{2} (217/sq mi)
- Time zone: UTC+01:00 (CET)
  - Summer (DST): UTC+02:00 (CEST)
- INSEE/Postal code: 14657 /14670
- ^{1} French Land Register data, which excludes lakes, ponds, glaciers > 1 km^{2} (0.386 sq mi or 247 acres) and river estuaries.

Saint-Samson is a commune in the Calvados department in the Normandy region in northwestern France.

== Population ==
Historical population
Year	Pop.	±% p.a.
1968	189	—
1975	200	+0.81%
1982	211	+0.77%
1990	317	+5.22%
1999	322	+0.17%
2007	345	+0.87%
2012	328	−1.01%
2017	308	−1.25%
2023	307	−0.05%
Source: INSEE

== See also ==
- Communes of the Calvados department
