= Vimont, Calvados =

Vimont
- Commune
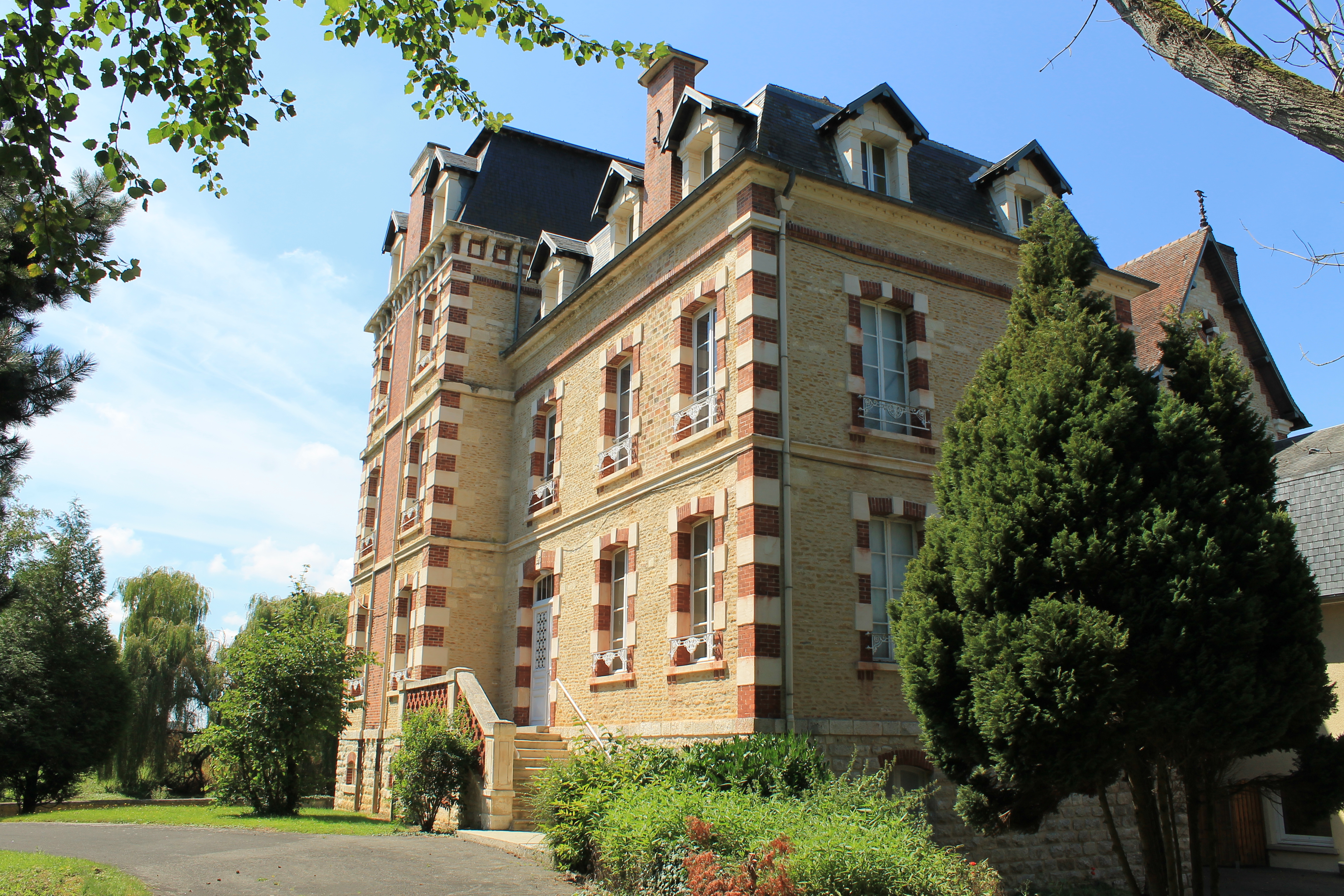
- Chateau of St. Pierre Oursin

- Coat of arms
- Location of Vimont
- Location within France Location within Normandy
- Coordinates: 49°07′20″N 0°11′50″W
- Country: France
- Region: Normandy
- Department: Calvados
- Arrondissement: Caen
- Canton: Troarn
- Intercommunality: CC Val ès Dunes

Government
  - Mayor (2020–2026): Jean-Pierre Forgeas
- Area^{1}: 8.96 km^{2} (3.46 sq mi)
- Elevation: 35 m (115 ft)
- Highest elevation: 29 m (95 ft)
- Lowest elevation: 2 m (6.6 ft)
- Population (2023): 887
  - Density: 99.0/km^{2} (256/sq mi)
- Time zone: UTC+01:00 (CET)
  - Summer (DST): UTC+02:00 (CEST)
- INSEE/Postal code: 14761 /14370
- ^{1} French Land Register data, which excludes lakes, ponds, glaciers > 1 km^{2} (0.386 sq mi or 247 acres) and river estuaries.

Vimont (French pronunciation: [vimɔ̃]) is a commune in the Calvados department in the Normandy region in northwestern France.

== Geography ==
The commune is made up of the following collection of villages and hamlets, Saint-Pierre Oursin, La Vieille Église and Vimont.

The Ruisseau des Petits Marais stream flows through the commune.

== Population ==
Historical population
Year	Pop.	±% p.a.
1968	218	—
1975	276	+3.43%
1982	413	+5.93%
1990	470	+1.63%
1999	483	+0.30%
2007	581	+2.34%
2012	739	+4.93%
2017	746	+0.19%
2023	887	+2.93%
Source: INSEE

== Points of Interest ==
- Memorial for Battle of Val-ès-Dunes a memorial dedicated to the site of the Battle of Val-ès-Dunes in 1047 built in 1851 by Arcisse de Caumont.

=== National Heritage Sites ===
- Château à Vimont an eighteenth century chateau that was classed as a Monument historique in 1978.

== See also ==
- Communes of the Calvados department
