= Saint-Pair =

- Commune
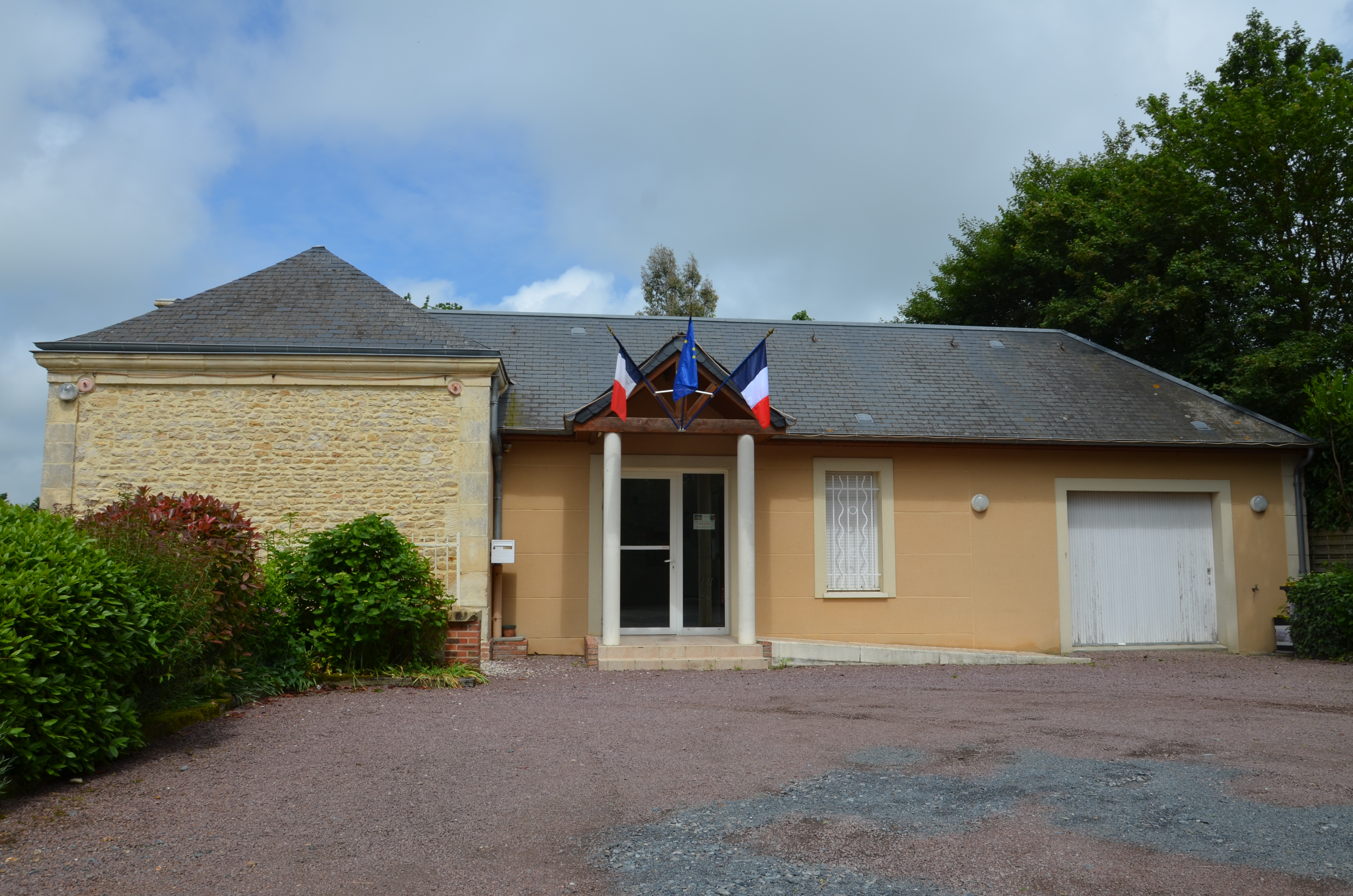
- The town hall in Saint-Pair
- Location of Saint-Pair
- Location within France Location within Normandy
- Coordinates: 49°10′12″N 0°11′03″W
- Country: France
- Region: Normandy
- Department: Calvados
- Arrondissement: Caen
- Canton: Troarn
- Intercommunality: CC Val ès Dunes

Government
  - Mayor (2020–2026): Patricia Lecomte
- Area^{1}: 3.28 km^{2} (1.27 sq mi)
- Elevation: 22 m (72 ft)
- Highest elevation: 43 m (141 ft)
- Lowest elevation: 3 m (9.8 ft)
- Population (2023): 245
  - Density: 74.7/km^{2} (193/sq mi)
- Time zone: UTC+01:00 (CET)
  - Summer (DST): UTC+02:00 (CEST)
- INSEE/Postal code: 14640 /14670
- ^{1} French Land Register data, which excludes lakes, ponds, glaciers > 1 km^{2} (0.386 sq mi or 247 acres) and river estuaries.

Saint-Pair is a commune in the Calvados department in the Normandy region in northwestern France.

== Population ==
Historical population
Year	Pop.	±% p.a.
1968	86	—
1975	129	+5.96%
1982	148	+1.98%
1990	156	+0.66%
1999	200	+2.80%
2007	248	+2.73%
2012	226	−1.84%
2017	219	−0.63%
2023	245	+1.89%
Source: INSEE

== See also ==
- Communes of the Calvados department
