= Janville, Calvados =

Janville
- Commune
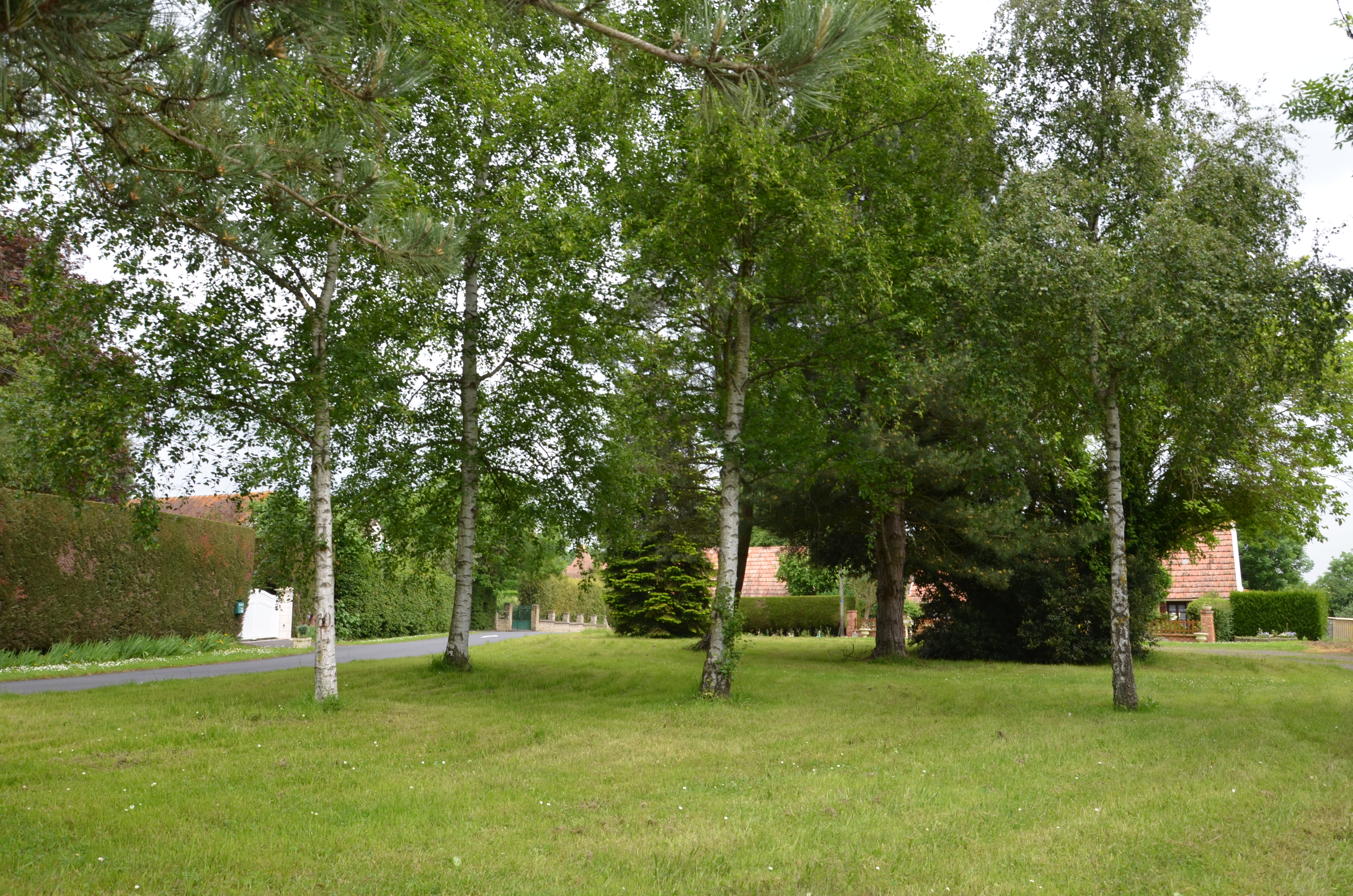
- The landscape in Janville
- Location of Janville
- Location within France Location within Normandy
- Coordinates: 49°09′50″N 0°09′36″W
- Country: France
- Region: Normandy
- Department: Calvados
- Arrondissement: Caen
- Canton: Troarn
- Intercommunality: CC Val ès Dunes

Government
  - Mayor (2020–2026): Henri Lehugeur
- Area^{1}: 4.44 km^{2} (1.71 sq mi)
- Elevation: 50 m (160 ft)
- Highest elevation: 43 m (141 ft)
- Lowest elevation: 2 m (6.6 ft)
- Population (2023): 382
  - Density: 86.0/km^{2} (223/sq mi)
- Time zone: UTC+01:00 (CET)
  - Summer (DST): UTC+02:00 (CEST)
- INSEE/Postal code: 14344 /14670
- ^{1} French Land Register data, which excludes lakes, ponds, glaciers > 1 km^{2} (0.386 sq mi or 247 acres) and river estuaries.

Janville (French pronunciation: [ʒɑ̃vil]) is a commune in the Calvados department in the Normandy region in northwestern France.

== Population ==
Historical population
Year	Pop.	±% p.a.
1968	126	—
1975	166	+4.02%
1982	340	+10.79%
1990	415	+2.52%
1999	406	−0.24%
2007	376	−0.95%
2012	365	−0.59%
2017	368	+0.16%
2023	382	+0.62%
Source: INSEE

== See also ==
- Communes of the Calvados department
