= Troarn =

- Commune
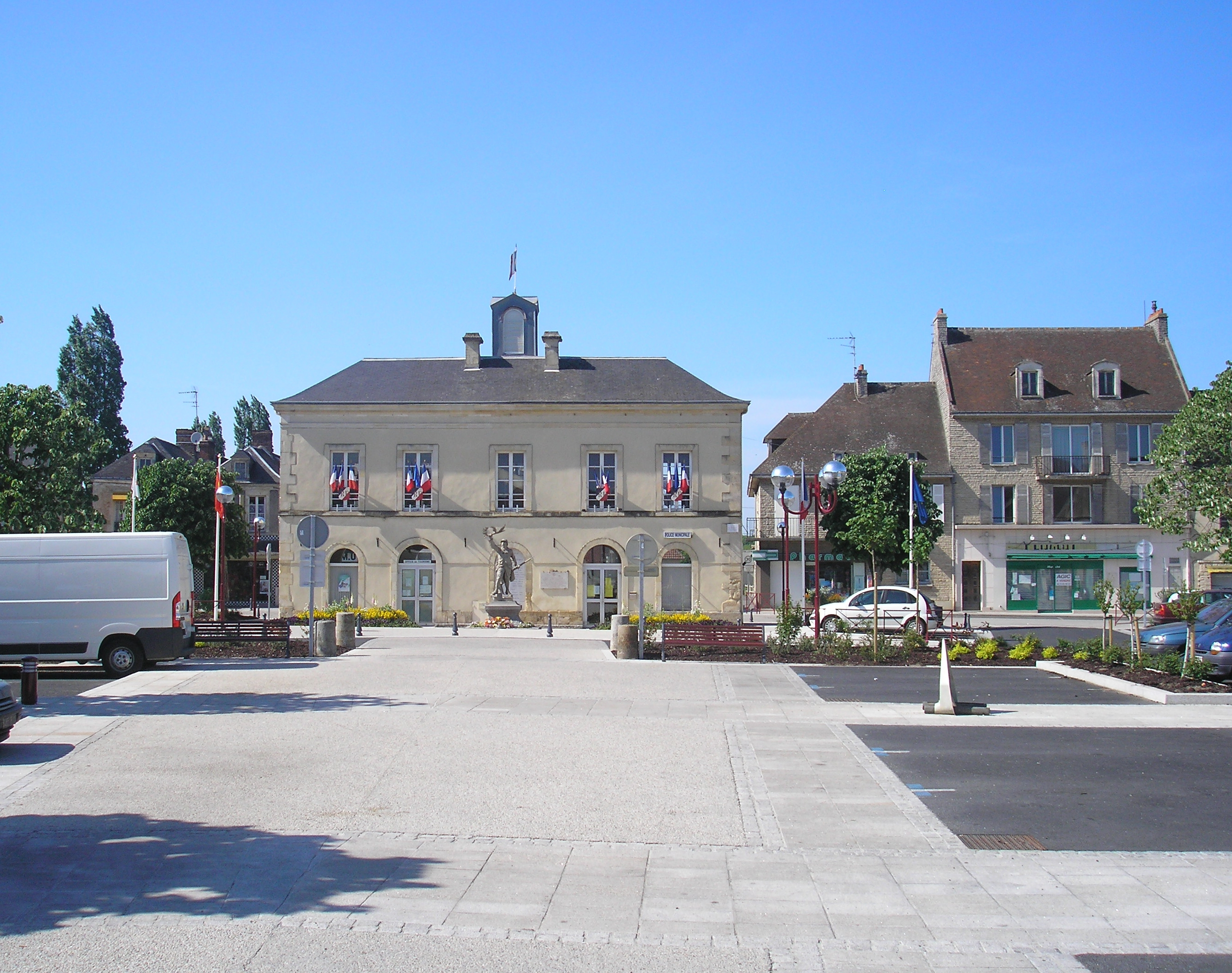
- Paul Quellec Square

- Coat of arms
- Location of Troarn
- Location within France Location within Normandy
- Coordinates: 49°10′56″N 0°11′00″W
- Country: France
- Region: Normandy
- Department: Calvados
- Arrondissement: Caen
- Canton: Troarn
- Intercommunality: CU Caen Mer

Government
  - Mayor (2020–2026): Christian Le Bas
- Area^{1}: 11.53 km^{2} (4.45 sq mi)
- Elevation: 36 m (118 ft)
- Highest elevation: 61 m (200 ft)
- Lowest elevation: 2 m (6.6 ft)
- Population (2023): 3,439
  - Density: 298.3/km^{2} (772.5/sq mi)
- Time zone: UTC+01:00 (CET)
  - Summer (DST): UTC+02:00 (CEST)
- INSEE/Postal code: 14712 /14670
- ^{1} French Land Register data, which excludes lakes, ponds, glaciers > 1 km^{2} (0.386 sq mi or 247 acres) and river estuaries.

Troarn (French pronunciation: [tʁɔ.aʁn]) is a commune in the Calvados of the Normandy region in northwestern France. On 1 January 2017, it was merged into the new commune Saline, but this merger was undone on 31 December 2019.

== Population ==
Historical population
Year	Pop.	±% p.a.
1968	1,375	—
1975	1,975	+5.31%
1982	3,011	+6.21%
1990	3,129	+0.48%
1999	3,176	+0.17%
2007	3,712	+1.97%
2012	3,639	−0.40%
2017	3,510	−0.72%
2023	3,439	−0.34%
Source: INSEE

== Sights ==
- The abbey founded by Roger de Montgomery in 1059

== See also ==
- Communes of the Calvados department
