= Saint-Pierre-du-Jonquet =

- Commune
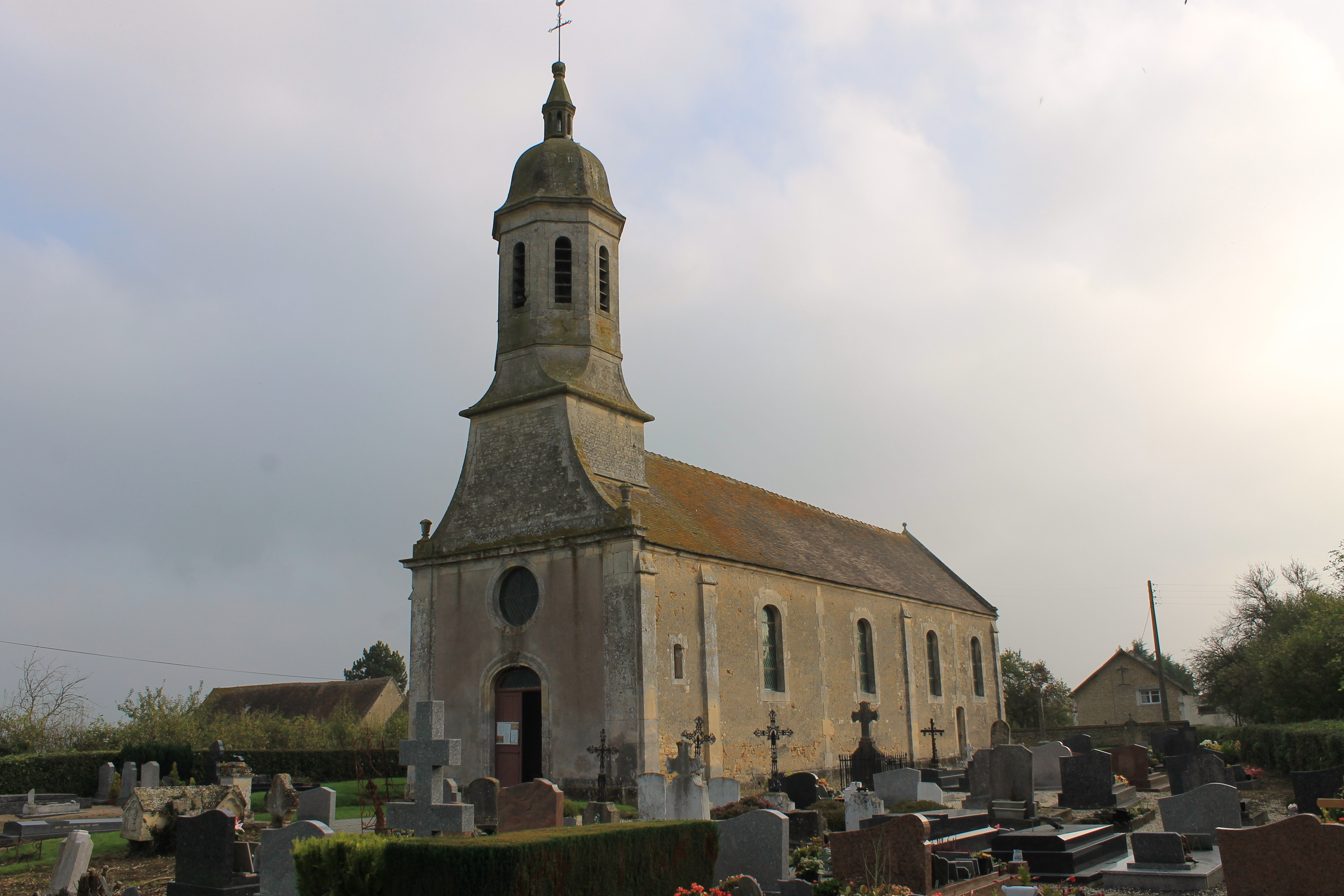
- The church in Saint-Pierre-du-Jonquet
- Location of Saint-Pierre-du-Jonquet
- Location within France Location within Normandy
- Coordinates: 49°10′15″N 0°07′18″W
- Country: France
- Region: Normandy
- Department: Calvados
- Arrondissement: Caen
- Canton: Troarn
- Intercommunality: CC Val ès Dunes

Government
  - Mayor (2020–2026): Didier Lemonnier
- Area^{1}: 8.17 km^{2} (3.15 sq mi)
- Elevation: 8 m (26 ft)
- Highest elevation: 44 m (144 ft)
- Lowest elevation: 2 m (6.6 ft)
- Population (2023): 293
  - Density: 35.9/km^{2} (92.9/sq mi)
- Time zone: UTC+01:00 (CET)
  - Summer (DST): UTC+02:00 (CEST)
- INSEE/Postal code: 14651 /14670
- ^{1} French Land Register data, which excludes lakes, ponds, glaciers > 1 km^{2} (0.386 sq mi or 247 acres) and river estuaries.

Saint-Pierre-du-Jonquet (French pronunciation: [sɛ̃ pjɛʁ dy ʒɔ̃kɛ]) is a commune in the Calvados department in the Normandy region in northwestern France.

== Population ==
Historical population
Year	Pop.	±% p.a.
1968	143	—
1975	138	−0.51%
1982	143	+0.51%
1990	146	+0.26%
1999	155	+0.67%
2007	184	+2.17%
2012	206	+2.28%
2017	237	+2.84%
2023	293	+3.60%
Source: INSEE

== See also ==
- Communes of the Calvados department
