= Émiéville =

- Commune
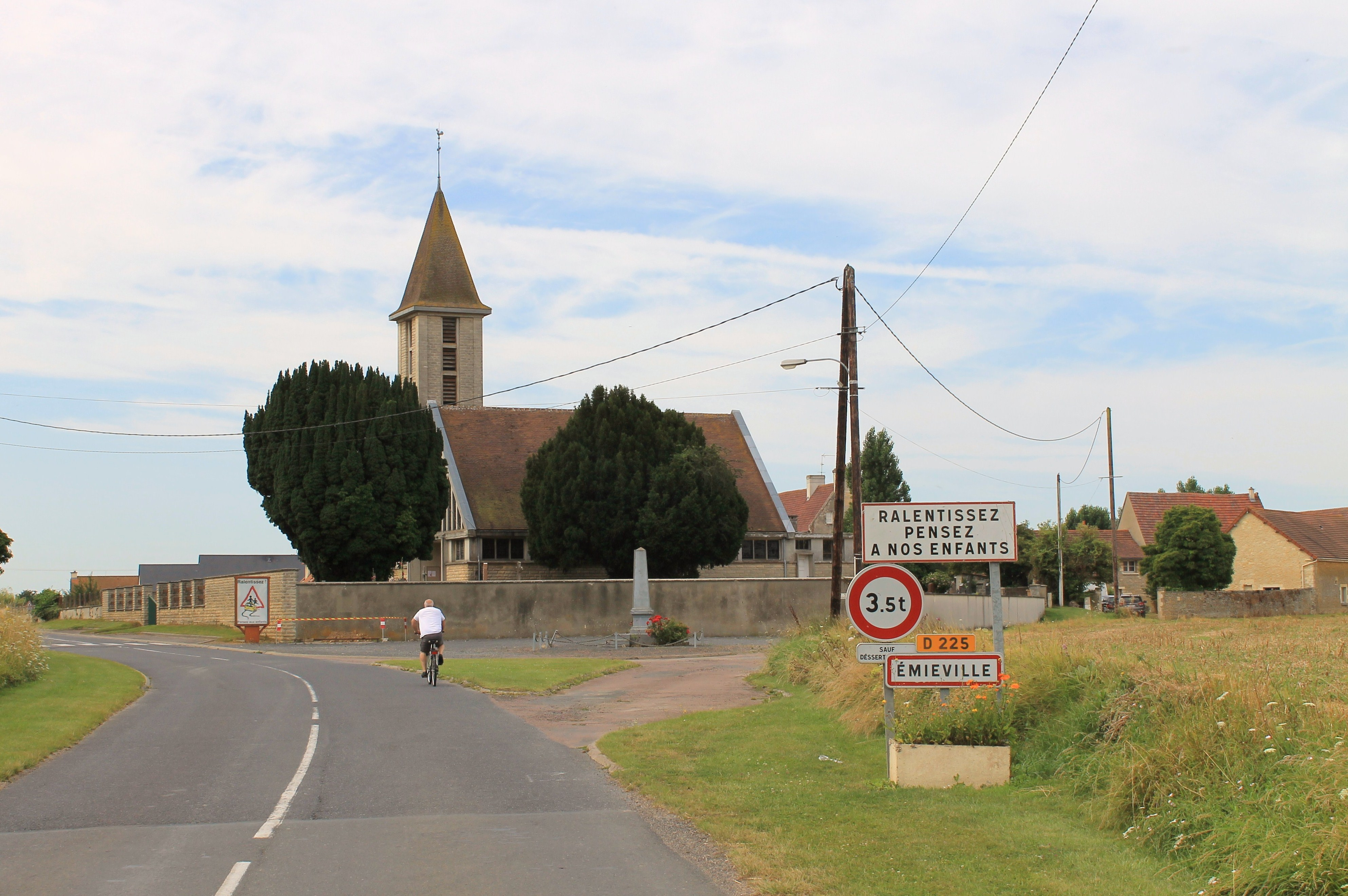
- The church in Émiéville
- Location of Émiéville
- Location within France Location within Normandy
- Coordinates: 49°09′07″N 0°13′22″W
- Country: France
- Region: Normandy
- Department: Calvados
- Arrondissement: Caen
- Canton: Troarn
- Intercommunality: CC Val ès Dunes

Government
  - Mayor (2020–2026): Stéphane Amilcar
- Area^{1}: 3.92 km^{2} (1.51 sq mi)
- Elevation: 11 m (36 ft)
- Highest elevation: 22 m (72 ft)
- Lowest elevation: 4 m (13 ft)
- Population (2023): 626
  - Density: 160/km^{2} (414/sq mi)
- Time zone: UTC+01:00 (CET)
  - Summer (DST): UTC+02:00 (CEST)
- INSEE/Postal code: 14237 /14630
- ^{1} French Land Register data, which excludes lakes, ponds, glaciers > 1 km^{2} (0.386 sq mi or 247 acres) and river estuaries.

Émiéville (French pronunciation: [emjevil]) is a commune in the Calvados department in the Normandy region in northwestern France.

== Population ==
Historical population
| Year | Pop. | ±% p.a. |
|---|---|---|
| 1968 | 198 | — |
| 1975 | 255 | +3.68% |
| 1982 | 280 | +1.35% |
| 1990 | 356 | +3.05% |
| 1999 | 349 | −0.22% |
| 2007 | 436 | +2.82% |
| 2012 | 584 | +6.02% |
| 2017 | 588 | +0.14% |
| 2023 | 626 | +1.05% |
Source: INSEE

== See also ==
- Communes of the Calvados department
