= Cesny =

Cesny may refer to:

- Cesny-les-Sources, a commune in the Calvados department in northwestern France.
- Cesny-Bois-Halbout, a former commune in the Calvados department in the Normandy region in northwestern France.
- Cesny-aux-Vignes, a commune in the Calvados department in the Normandy region in northwestern France.
- Cesny-aux-Vignes-Ouézy, a commune in the Calvados department in the Normandy region in northwestern France.
