= Airan =

- Part of Valambray
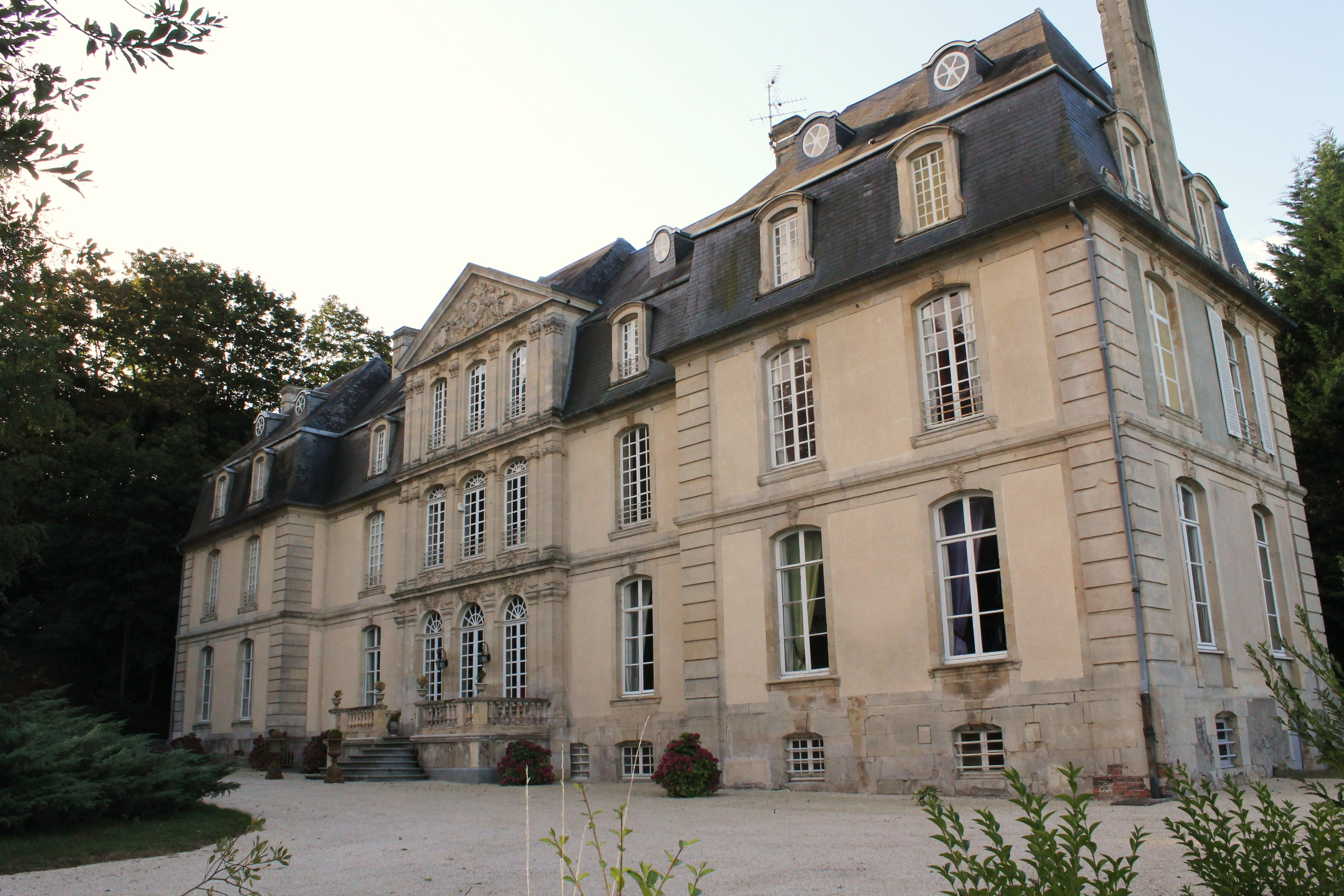
- Chateau of Coupigny
- Location of Airan
- Location within France Location within Normandy
- Coordinates: 49°06′07″N 0°09′02″W
- Country: France
- Region: Normandy
- Department: Calvados
- Arrondissement: Caen
- Canton: Troarn
- Commune: Valambray
- Area^{1}: 13.5 km^{2} (5.2 sq mi)
- Elevation: 30 m (98 ft)
- Highest elevation: 64 m (210 ft)
- Lowest elevation: 22 m (72 ft)
- Population (2021): 648
  - Density: 48.0/km^{2} (124/sq mi)
- Time zone: UTC+01:00 (CET)
  - Summer (DST): UTC+02:00 (CEST)
- Postal code: 14370
- ^{1} French Land Register data, which excludes lakes, ponds, glaciers > 1 km^{2} (0.386 sq mi or 247 acres) and river estuaries.

Airan (French pronunciation: [ɛʁɑ̃]) is a former commune in the Calvados department in the Normandy region of northwestern France. On 1 January 2017, it was merged into the new commune Valambray.

== Geography ==
Airan is located some 17 km south-east of Caen and 25 km east by south-east of Lisieux. It can be accessed from the D40 from Vimont in the north-west, passing through the south of the commune and continuing south-east to Vieux-Fumé. The D613 (Route de Paris) also from Vimont passes through the north of the commune and continues east to Crèvecœur-en-Auge. Neither road passes the village which can be accessed by the D47 road from Moult in the west which passes through the village then the heart of the commune before continuing south-east to Cesny-aux-Vignes. There is also the D43 road coming from the north through the village and continuing south to Fierville-Bray. The railway from Caen to Mézidon-Canon passes through the commune from west to east but there is no station in the commune. The nearest station is Bonafini to the west. The commune is quite large in extent and consists almost entirely of farmland with a few small patches of forest. Apart from the village there are also the hamlets of Le Haute-des-Pedouzes, Le Ruel, Valmeray, and Coupigny.

The Muance river forms part of the western border of the commune before it flows west then north to join the Dives river through a network of canals near Bures-sur-Dives. The Douet also rises in the north of the commune and forms part of the northern border before continuing north to join the Dives near Hernetot.

== Toponymy ==
The name is of Continental Germanic origin in an area where such origins are rare (Heidram from the 9th century), possibly a personal name taken from Heidrammus or alternatively the name -ham preceded by an appellative or an unidentified person's name.

== History ==
Archaeological excavations have uncovered the remains of a Merovingian necropolis. There is a legend of the famous Treasure of Airan.

In 1942, the resistance caused two derailments in the commune - on the night of 15 to 16 April and also on 30 April to 1 May. These two derailments left a total of forty dead and fifty wounded German soldiers who were on leave in these trains. Following this Nazi repression was brutal for many hostages: some were shot, others deported.

== Administration ==
List of Successive Mayors of Airan

From	To	Name	Party	Position
1850	1862	M. Borgarelli d'Ison		Colonel of Infantry E.R.
1862	1869	Jules Alfred Le Tourneur du Coudray		First Secretary for the Minister of Finance
1869	1903	Stanislas Le Tourneur d'Ison		Attached to the Taxation Administration of France
?	?	Yves le Tourneur d'Ison		Doctor of Juridical Science
1966	1989	Maurice Lecoq		Market gardener
1989	2008	Michel Deuzet	SE	Farmer
2008	2017	Patrice Martin	SE	Bank Officer

== Population ==
The inhabitants of the commune are known as Airannais or Airannaises in French.

Historical population
Year	Pop.	±% p.a.
2006	594	—
2011	688	+2.98%
2021	648	−0.60%
Source: INSEE

== Culture and heritage ==
=== Civil heritage ===
The commune has a number of buildings and structures that are registered as historical monuments:

- A Water Mill (1682) is typical of the Caen region.
- The Chateau of Coupigny (18th century)
- The Chateau of Coupigny Park (18th century)

Other sites of interest

- Valmeray Tower and its surroundings are classified by DREAL Lower Normandy as an historical monument. The ruined tower is located in a hamlet near Airan. An old legend tells of a secret passage connecting the tower to the church at Airan. The legend also says that the old bell in gold from the church is hidden in the secret passage. Many people have tried to find it but without success.
- The Alley of Lime Trees along the D43 is also registered with DREAL.

=== Religious heritage ===
The commune has several religious buildings and structures that are registered as historical monuments:

- The Church of Saint Germain (12th century) has a Romanesque facade.

=== Picture Gallery ===
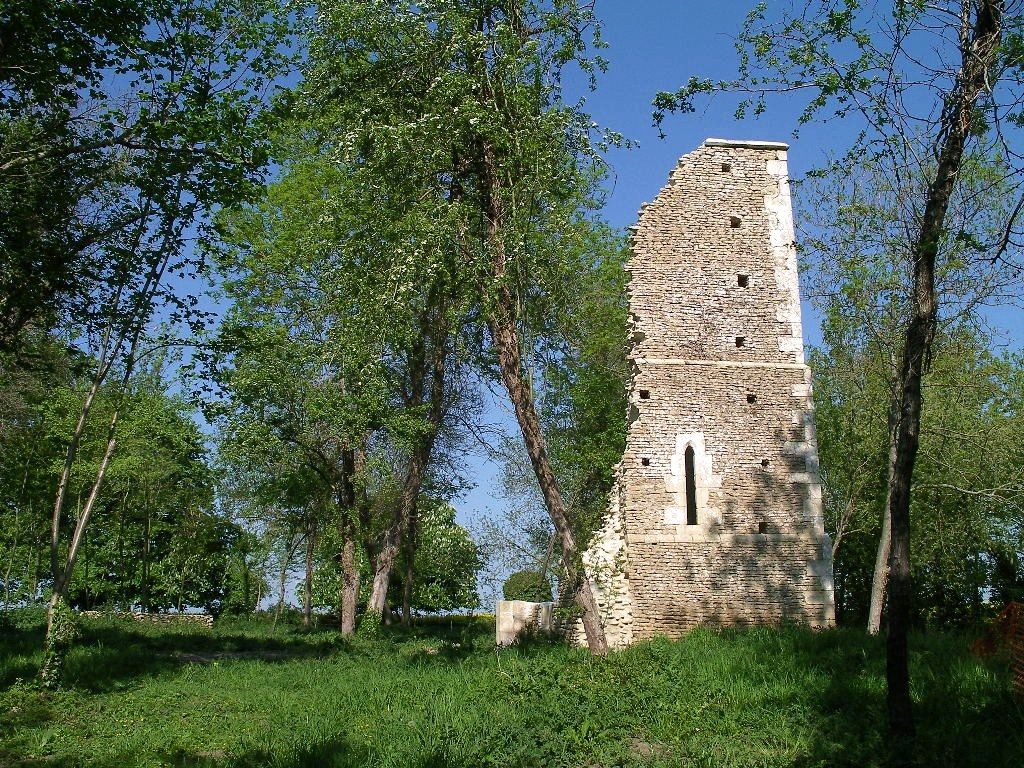
Valmeray Tower

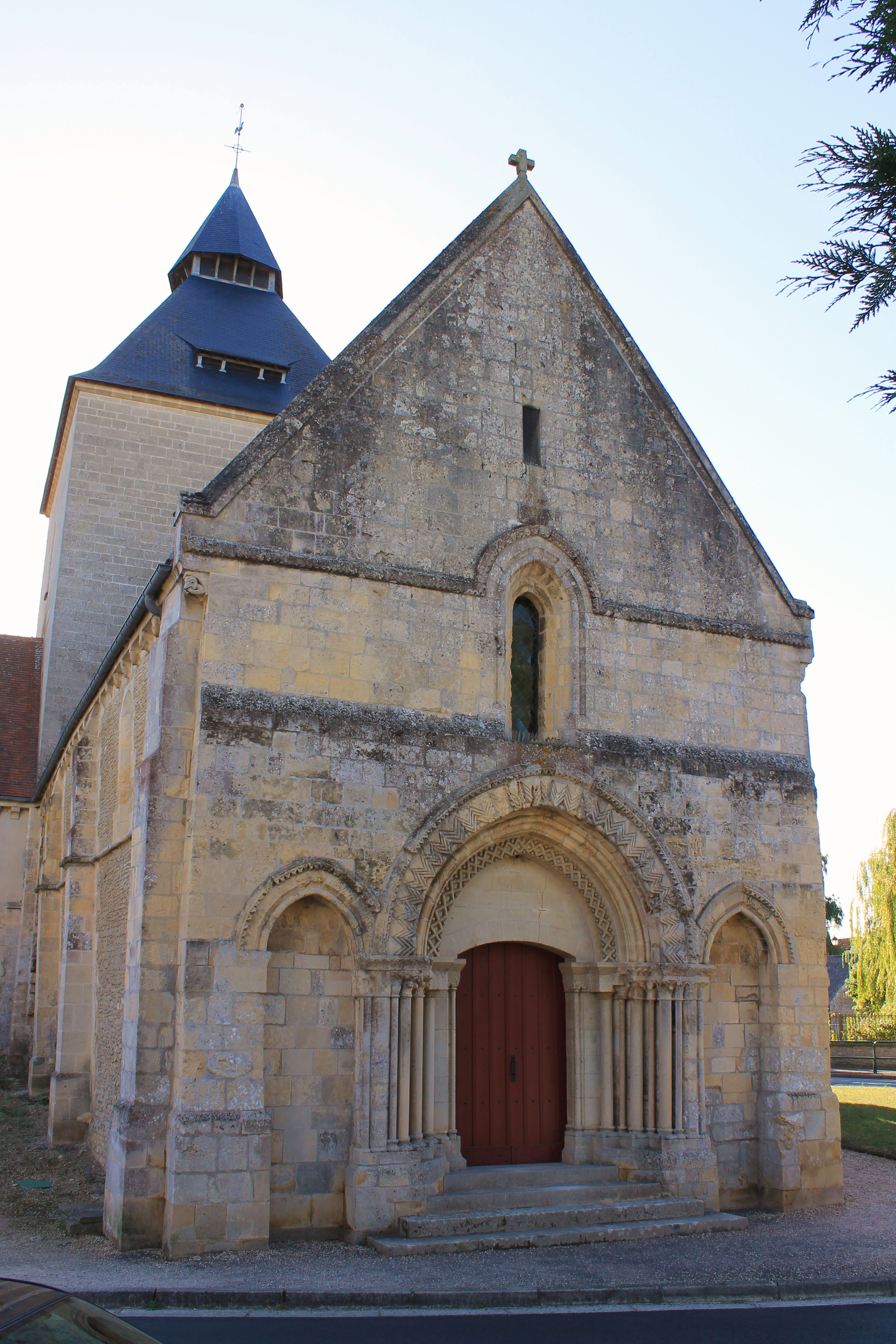
The Church of Saint-Germain

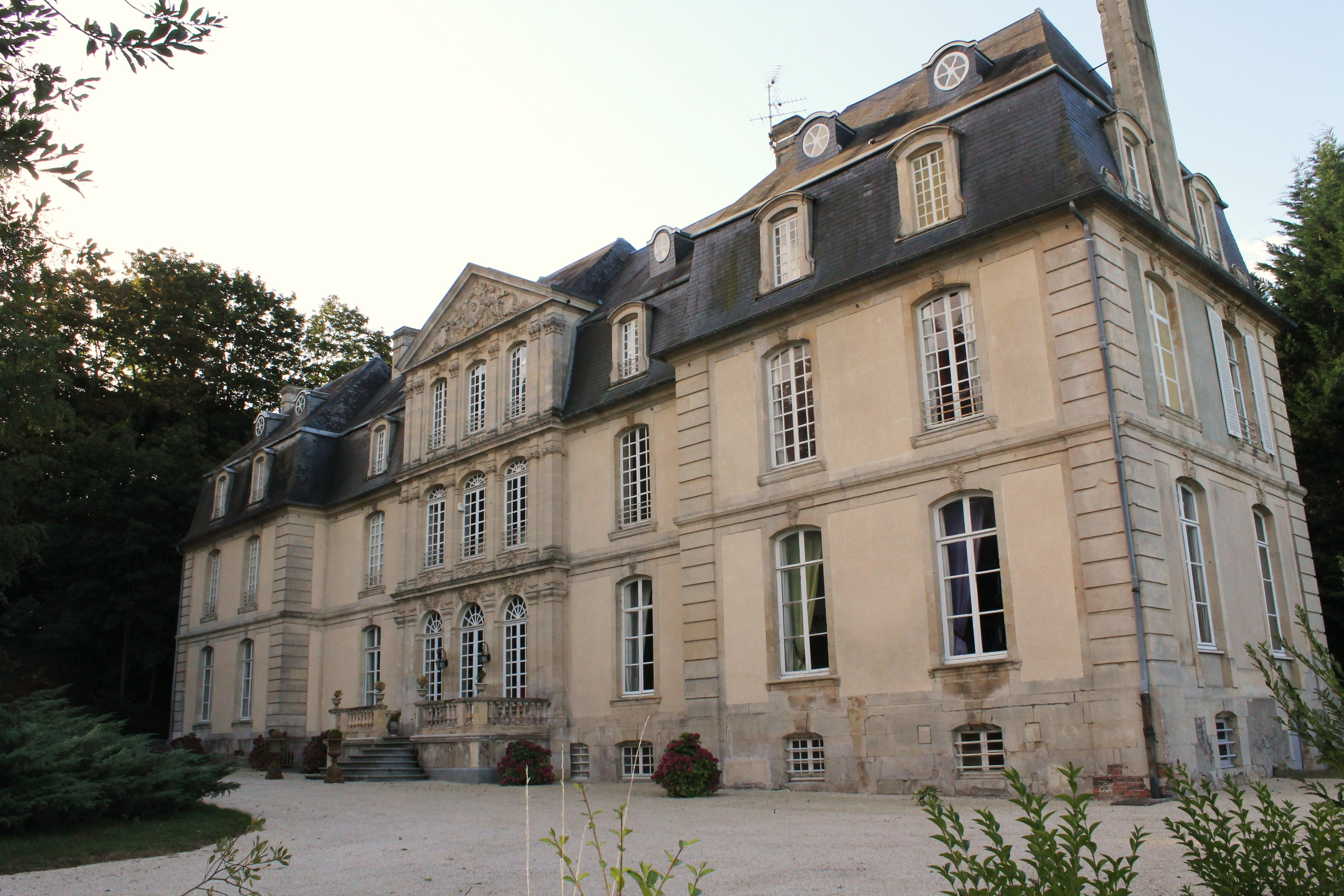
Coupigny Castle

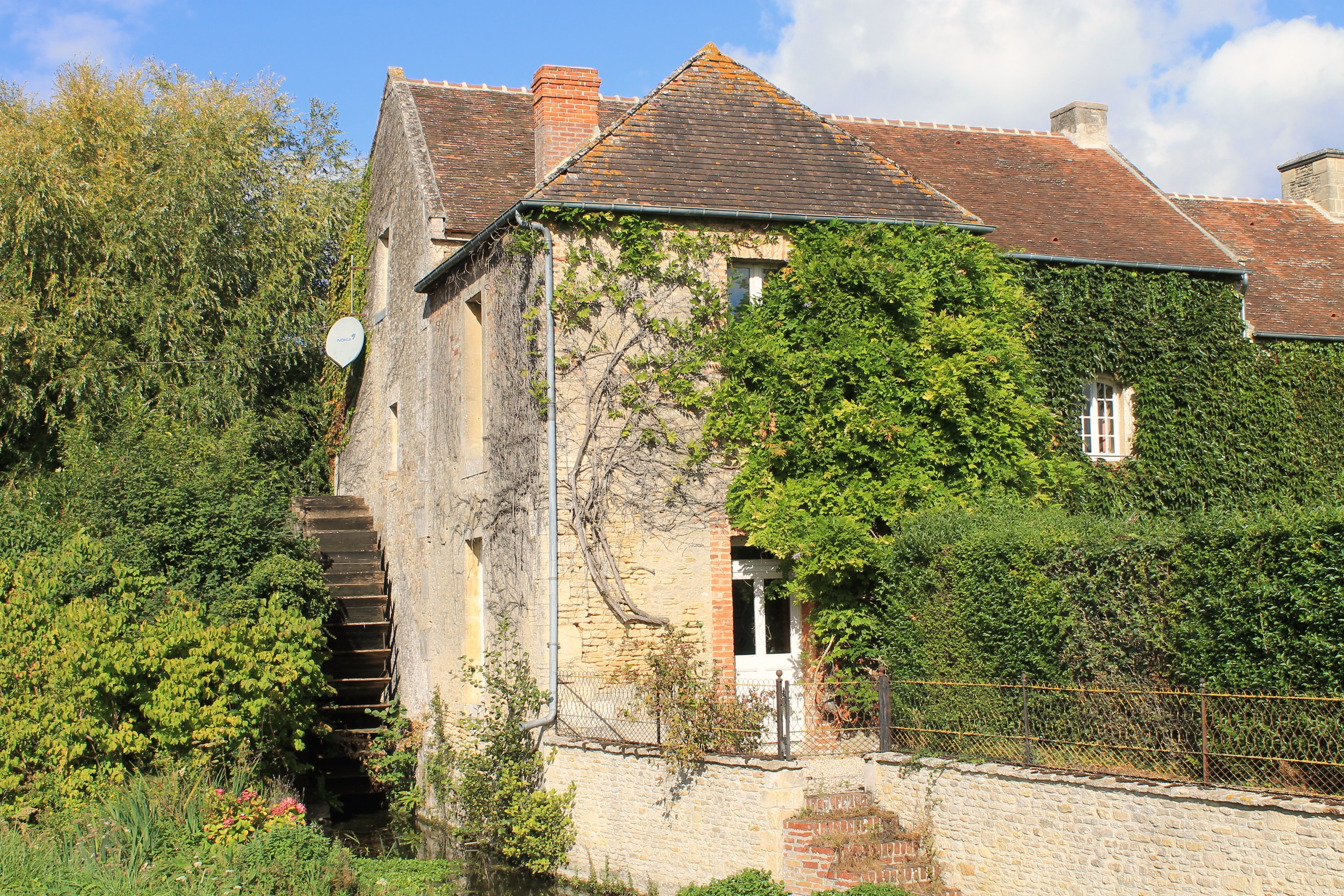
The Watermill

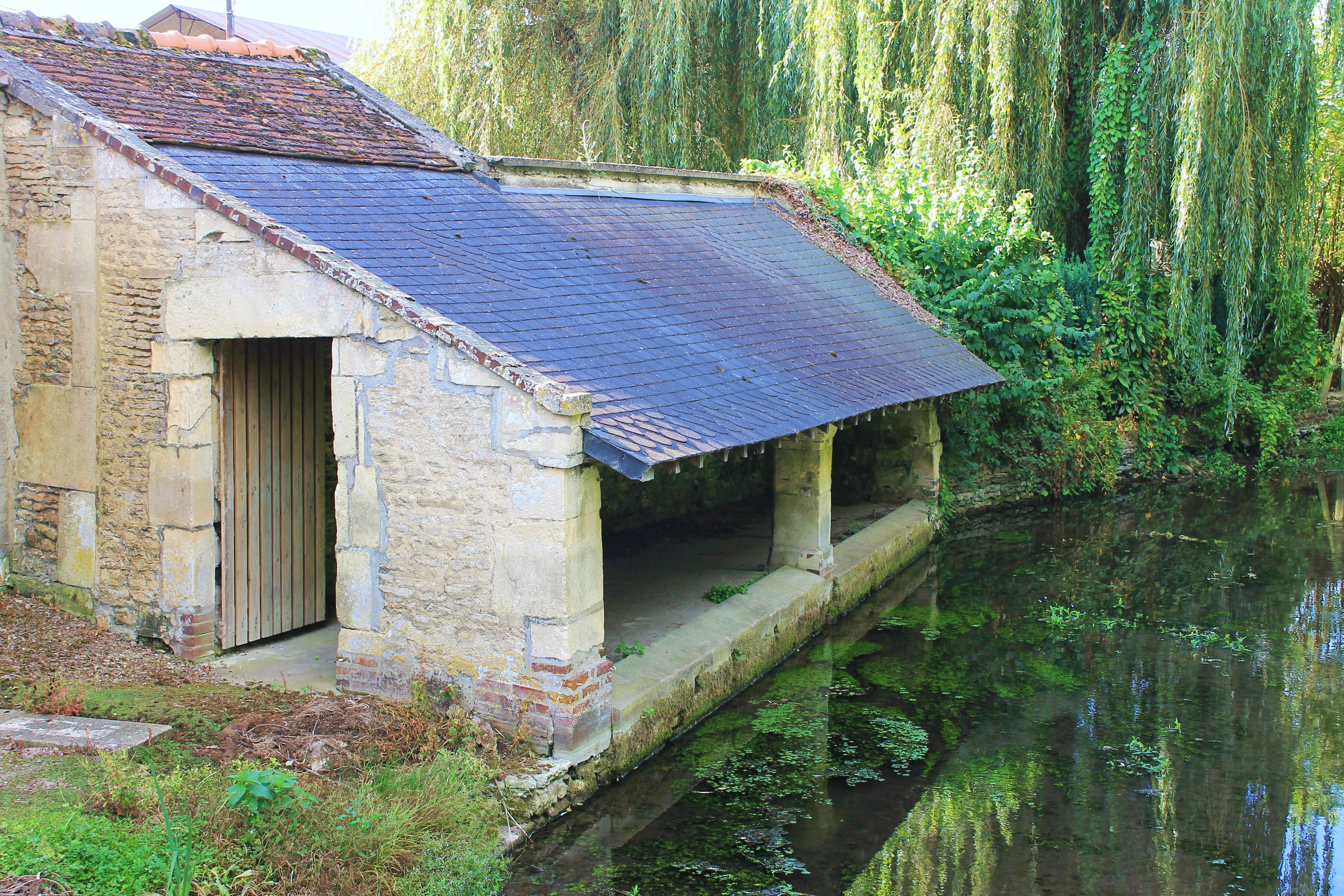
The Lavoir (Public laundry) on the Muance river

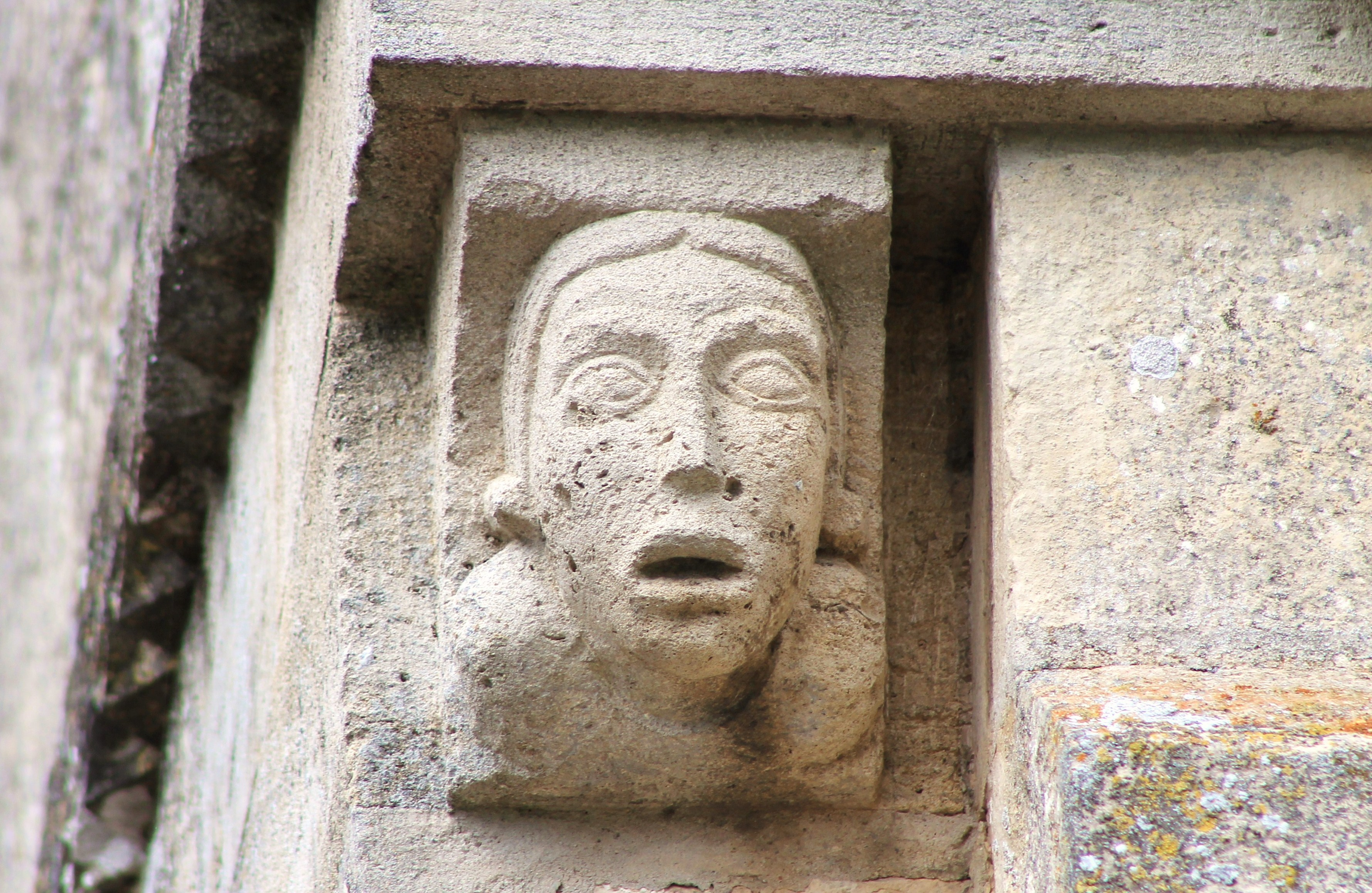
Gargoyle on the Church

== See also ==
- Communes of the Calvados department

=== External links ===
- Airan on the 1750 Cassini Map
