= Fierville =

Fierville may refer to:

- Fierville-Bray, a former commune in the Calvados department in the Normandy region in northwestern France.
- Fierville-les-Mines, a commune in the Manche department in north-western France
- Fierville-les-Parcs, a commune in the Calvados department in the Normandy region of northwestern France.
