= Acqueville =

Acqueville is the name of several communes in France:

- Acqueville, Calvados, in the Calvados département
- Acqueville, Manche, in the Manche département
