= Grimoult du Plessis =

Norman baron (died 1047)

Baron Grimoult of Le Plessis, or du Plessis
- Born: Unknown
- Died: 1047
- Known for: Attempted coup
- Criminal charge: Treason
- Criminal penalty: Execution
- Children: Guillaume I du Plessis
- Father: Osulf fil. Fane

Grimoult du Plessis or of Le Plessis was an 11th-century Norman baron.

== Biography ==
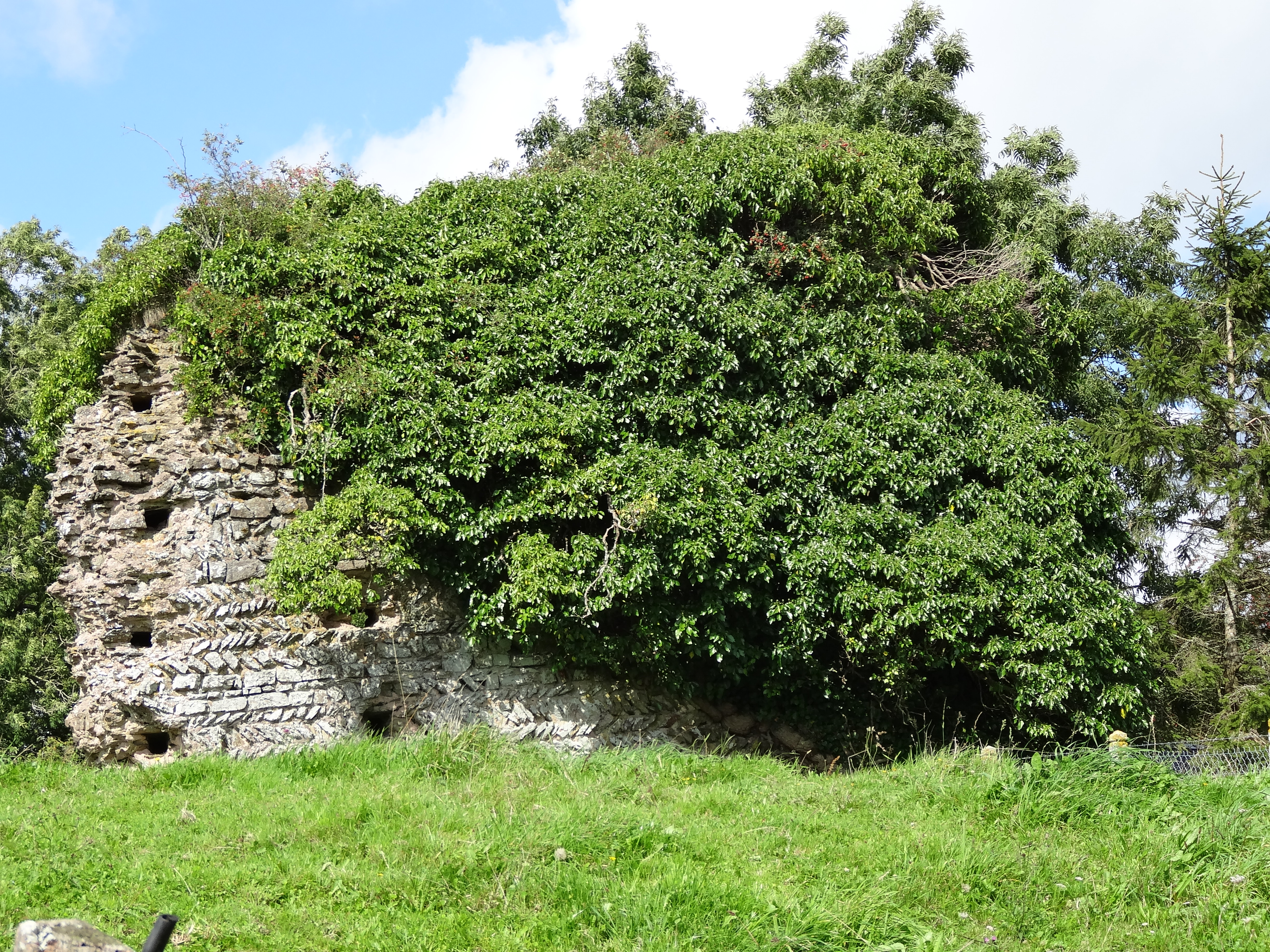
The ruins of his castle

Grimoult or Grimoald was the lord of the villages of Saint-Jean-le-Blanc, Périgny, and Le Plessis-Grimoult, which took the additional name "Grimoult" from him. The lands of Le Plessis comprised 10,600 hectares and extended across 12 parishes around the castle of Le Plessis-Grimoult.

Grimoult was part of a conspiracy to assassinate William the Conqueror, who at that point was struggling to maintain control of the duchy of Normandy after the death of his father. In 1047 the conspirators arranged for William, then only 19, to be killed at Valognes, but William was warned and the assassination attempt failed. Grimoult and his co-conspirators raised an army of around 25,000 men and fought against William and his backer King Henry I of France at the Battle of Val-ès-Dunes. Because Grimoult held less influence than the other conspirators he was the only one to be imprisoned in the tower of Rouen and then executed by the Duke. Grimoult's lands were confiscated, his castle was destroyed and his barony was given to the Duke's half brother Odo, the Bishop of Bayeux, for the use of the church.
