= Battle of Val-ès-Dunes =

11th-century battle in Europe

Coordinates: 49°05′N 00°15′W

Val-ès-Dunes
- Map of the battlefield
Date	early summer of 1047
Location	near Caen, Normandy
Result	Franco-Norman victory

Belligerents
Duchy of Normandy; Kingdom of France	Norman rebels

Commanders and leaders
Henry I of France; William II of Normandy	Guy of Burgundy; Nigel of the Cotentin; Grimoald of Plessis (executed); Hamon Dentatus † Ralph Tesson of Thury (defected)

Strength
~10,000 men (pre-battle)	~25,000 men (pre-battle)

Casualties and losses
Unknown, presumably light	Thousands

The Battle of Val-ès-Dunes (Valesdunes) was fought in 1047 by the combined forces of the Norman duke William I and the French king Henry I against the forces of several rebel Norman barons, led by William's cousin Guy of Brionne.

As a result of winning the battle, William was able to retain his title and maintain control over the western half of his duchy.

== Background ==
William had succeeded to his title in 1035, as the seven-year-old illegitimate son of the previous Duke, Robert I. Several of William's kinsmen (including Guy of Burgundy, his cousin) believed themselves to have a better claim to the title, but William had the support of King Henry I and other influential nobles.

In 1046, some of William's enemies decided to finally strike. After an ambush near Valognes on the Cotentin Peninsula failed, the rebel nobles—Guy of Burgundy, Nigel of the Cotentin, Rannulf of the Bessin, Ralph Tesson of Thury, Grimoald of Plessis, and Hamon Dentatus (Haimo of Creully)—raised an army of about 25,000 men.

After escaping the ambush, William rode directly to King Henry's court in Poissy, and reminded the king that a revolt against his faithful vassal was a revolt against himself. Wanting to protect his vassal and ally, King Henry raised an army of about 10,000 men to march on Normandy.

== Battle ==
In the summer of 1047, King Henry's army joined Duke William's (the conqueror) much smaller Norman army near Caen, in the heart of rebel territory. During the first part of the battle, Ralph Tesson realized on which side allegiance truly lay, and he and his men then changed sides and joined the royal army, attacking the rebels from the rear. The next day, the armies fought on the plain of Val-ès-Dunes, near the present-day town of Conteville.

The battle consisted mainly of a series of cavalry skirmishes. The rebel army outnumbered the royal army, but it lacked the latter's coordination and leadership. Haimo of Creully (Haimon or Hamo Dentatus) unhorsed King Henry, but was killed before he could injure him. After losing several skirmishes, the rebel army broke apart, panicked, and fled to the west. The royal army pursued closely, slaughtering rebels by the thousands and driving the remnants of their army into the Orne River, near the Athis fort and Fleury-sur-Orne. An observer recorded that the bodies of the rebel knights who tried to cross the Orne were so numerous that bloated bodies blocked the mill of Barbillon as the river carried them downstream en masse.

The battle is traditionally said to have taken place on 10 August, but there is no decisive evidence for this date. The historian David Douglas argues for a date early in 1047 on the ground that the drowning of the fleeing army indicates that the Orne was flooded, which points to the winter or spring. However, David Bates dismisses this argument as the tidal nature of the Orne would account for the drownings. In his view, the battle almost certainly took place in the summer.

== Aftermath ==
While the royal army drove much of the rebel army to the west, Gui of Burgundy and his surviving forces escaped to his lands in the east and holed up in the strategic castle of Brionne. Despite an energetic siege, William was not able to force the castle into surrender until 1050, and, during that time, he was not able to assert his authority in the eastern third of his duchy, which lay beyond Brionne.

After the Battle of Val-ès-Dunes, there was still strong opposition to William among the Norman nobles, but they were forced to declare a "Truce of God" at Caen in October 1047. This truce, backed by the full endorsement of the Church, stated that private wars or vendettas were prohibited from Wednesday evening to Monday morning. The truce gave William special rights to defend his title and the public order; he did not, along with King Henry I, have to abide by the order. Even though William's position was still weak, with Gui of Burgundy still holding out and William having to pardon many of the barons who had opposed him, it would be five years before he had to face another major revolt.

== Legacy ==
In 1851 under the direction of Arcisse de Caumont a memorial was built on the battleground in Vimont.

== Sources ==
- Bates, David (2016). William the Conqueror. New Haven, Connecticut: Yale University Press. ISBN 978-0-300-23416-9.
- Douglas, David C. (1964). William the Conqueror: The Norman Impact Upon England. Berkeley: University of California Press. p. 50. ISBN 978-0-520-00350-7.
- Potter, Julie (1999). "The Benefactors of Bec and the Politics of Priories". In Harper-Bill, Christopher (ed.). Anglo-Norman Studies XXI: Proceedings of the Battle Conference 1998. Boydell & Brewer. ISBN 978-0-85115-745-0.
