= Placy =

- Part of Cesny-les-Sources
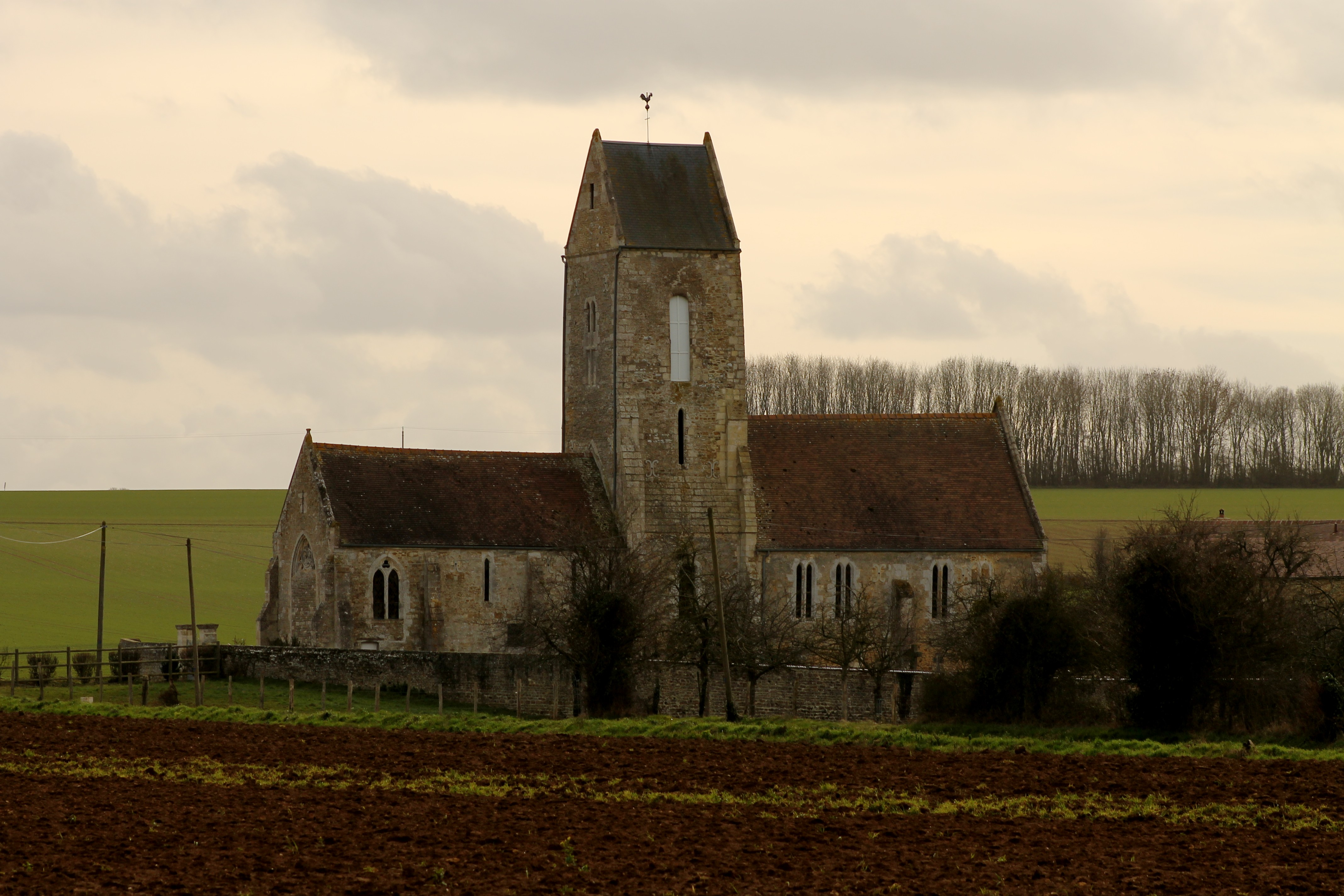
- The church in Placy
- Location of Placy
- Location within France Location within Normandy
- Coordinates: 48°58′37″N 0°25′08″W
- Country: France
- Region: Normandy
- Department: Calvados
- Arrondissement: Caen
- Canton: Le Hom
- Commune: Cesny-les-Sources
- Area^{1}: 5.46 km^{2} (2.11 sq mi)
- Elevation: 158 m (518 ft)
- Highest elevation: 206 m (676 ft)
- Lowest elevation: 60 m (200 ft)
- Population (2023): 167
  - Density: 30.6/km^{2} (79.2/sq mi)
- Time zone: UTC+01:00 (CET)
  - Summer (DST): UTC+02:00 (CEST)
- Postal code: 14220
- ^{1} French Land Register data, which excludes lakes, ponds, glaciers > 1 km^{2} (0.386 sq mi or 247 acres) and river estuaries.

Placy (French pronunciation: [plasi]) is a former commune in the Calvados department in the Normandy region in northwestern France. On 1 January 2019, it was merged into the new commune of Cesny-les-Sources.

== See also ==
- Communes of the Calvados department
