= Poussy-la-Campagne =

- Part of Valambray
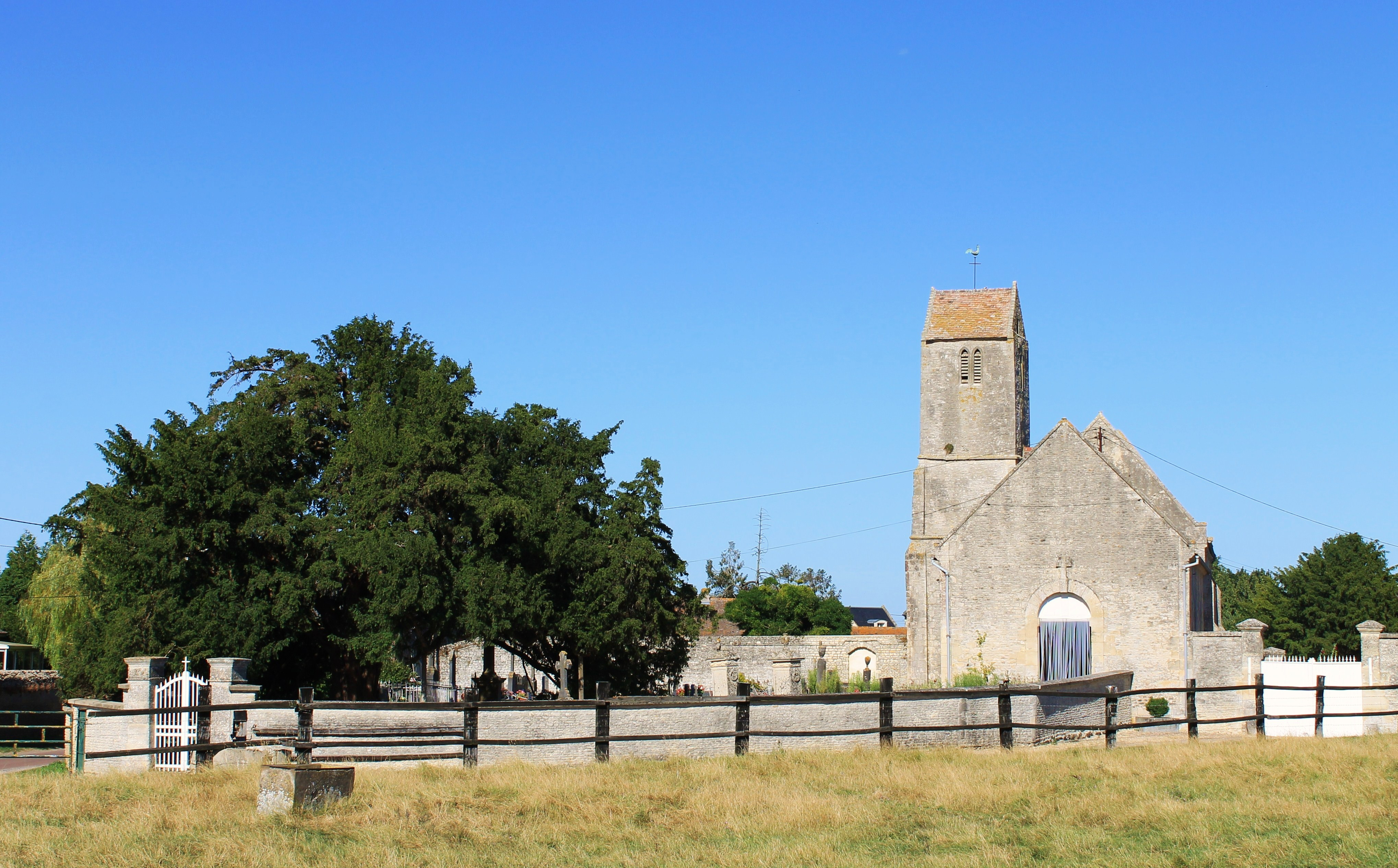
- Location of Poussy-la-Campagne
- Location within France Location within Normandy
- Coordinates: 49°04′51″N 0°13′22″W
- Country: France
- Region: Normandy
- Department: Calvados
- Arrondissement: Caen
- Canton: Troarn
- Commune: Valambray
- Area^{1}: 4.08 km^{2} (1.58 sq mi)
- Elevation: 49 m (161 ft)
- Highest elevation: 86 m (282 ft)
- Lowest elevation: 37 m (121 ft)
- Population (2023): 86
  - Density: 21/km^{2} (55/sq mi)
- Time zone: UTC+01:00 (CET)
  - Summer (DST): UTC+02:00 (CEST)
- Postal code: 14540
- ^{1} French Land Register data, which excludes lakes, ponds, glaciers > 1 km^{2} (0.386 sq mi or 247 acres) and river estuaries.

Poussy-la-Campagne (French pronunciation: [pusi la kɑ̃paɲ]) is a former commune in the Calvados department in the Normandy region in northwestern France. On 1 January 2017, it was merged into the new commune Valambray.

== See also ==
- Communes of the Calvados department
