= Conteville, Calvados =

Conteville
- Part of Valambray
- Location of Conteville
- Location within France Location within Normandy
- Coordinates: 49°05′23″N 0°14′06″W
- Country: France
- Region: Normandy
- Department: Calvados
- Arrondissement: Caen
- Canton: Troarn
- Commune: Valambray
- Area^{1}: 4.14 km^{2} (1.60 sq mi)
- Elevation: 50 m (160 ft)
- Highest elevation: 94 m (308 ft)
- Lowest elevation: 39 m (128 ft)
- Population (2023): 90
  - Density: 22/km^{2} (56/sq mi)
- Time zone: UTC+01:00 (CET)
  - Summer (DST): UTC+02:00 (CEST)
- Postal code: 14540
- ^{1} French Land Register data, which excludes lakes, ponds, glaciers > 1 km^{2} (0.386 sq mi or 247 acres) and river estuaries.

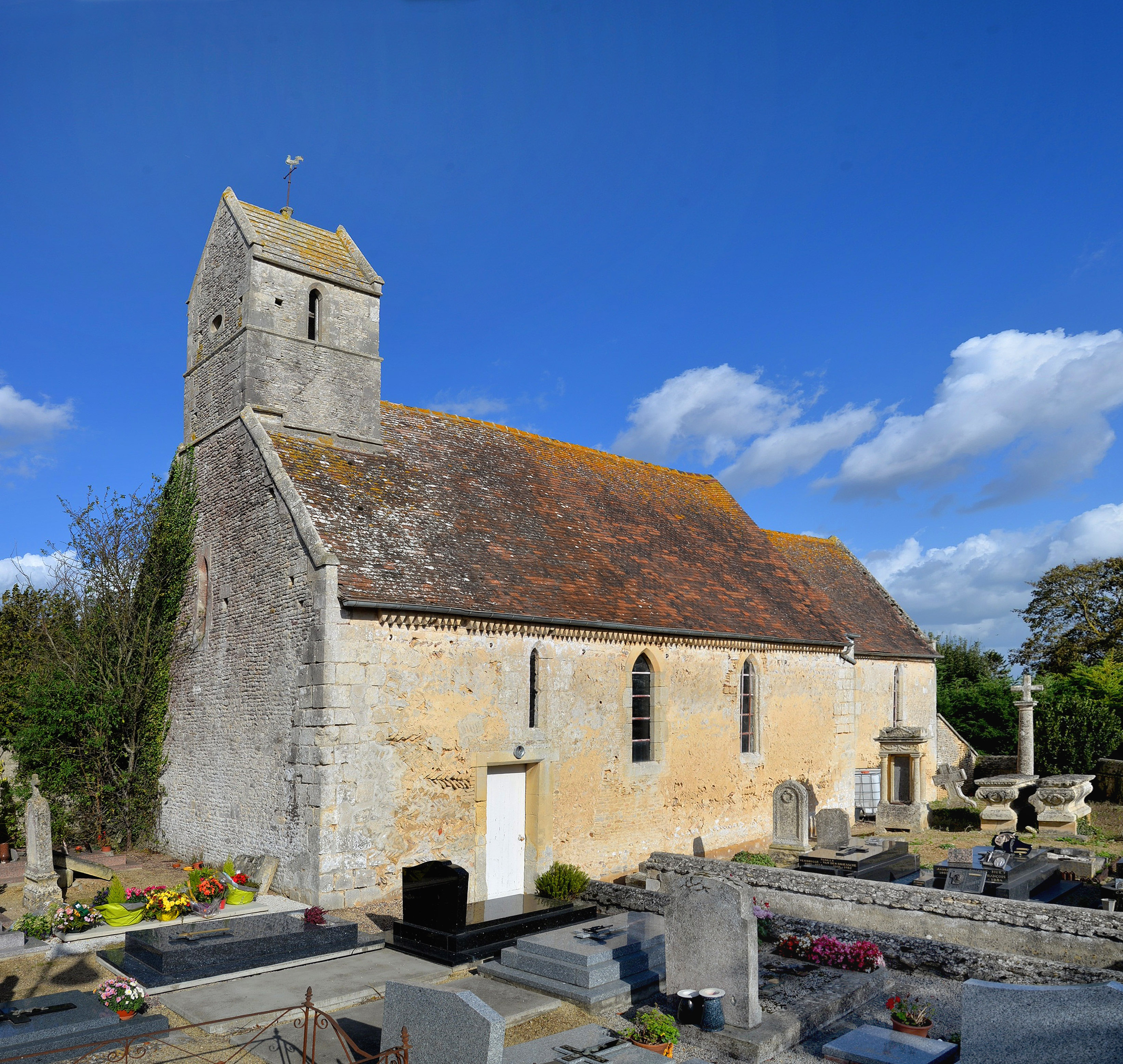
Église des Saints-Innocents de Conteville

Conteville is a former commune in the Calvados department in the Normandy region in northwestern France. On 1 January 2017, it was merged into the new commune Valambray.

== See also ==
- Battle of Val-ès-Dunes
- Communes of the Calvados department
