= Ouézy =

- Commune
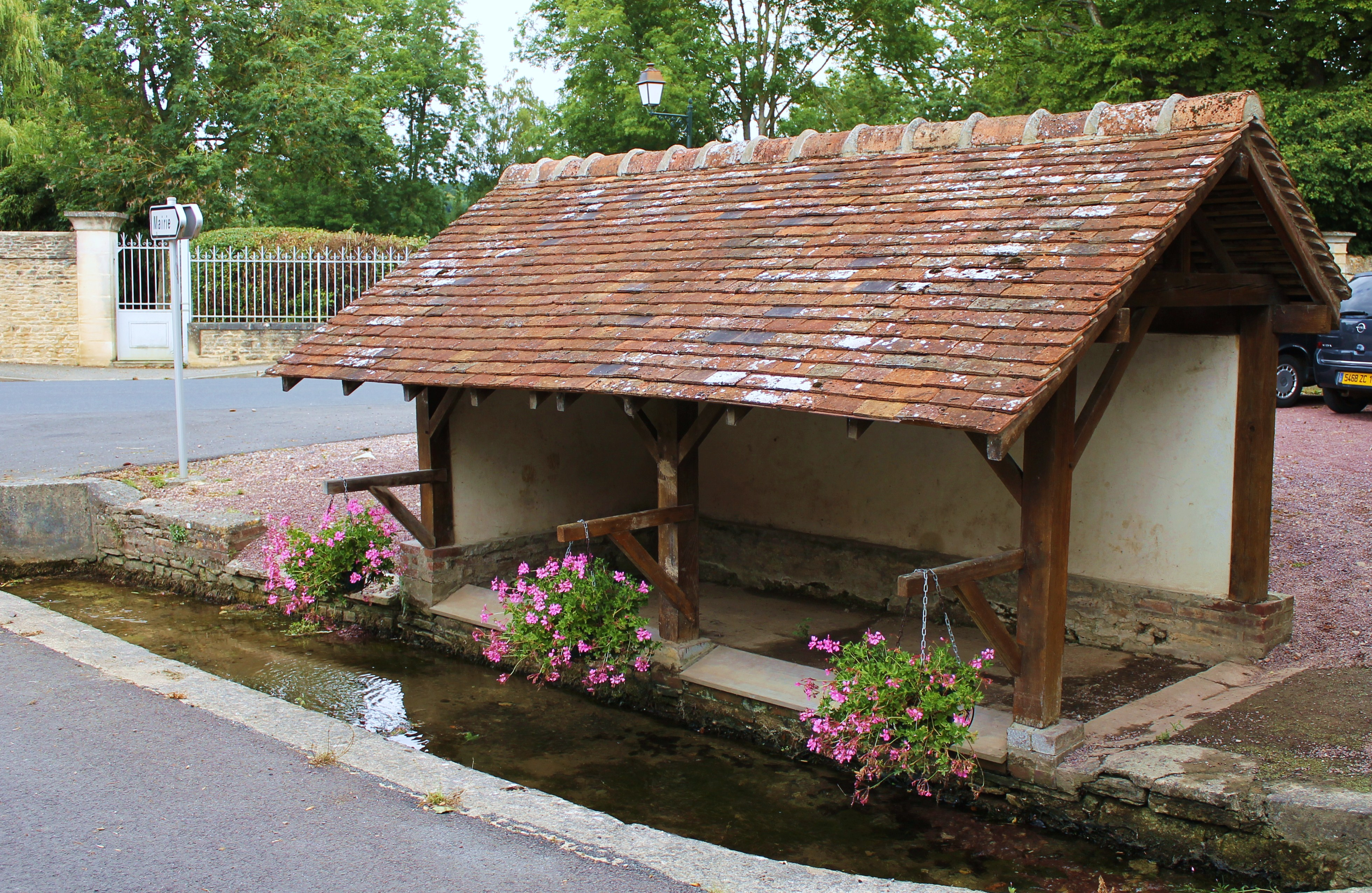
- The public washhouse in Ouézy

- Coat of arms
- Location of Ouézy
- Location within France Location within Normandy
- Coordinates: 49°05′06″N 0°06′14″W
- Country: France
- Region: Normandy
- Department: Calvados
- Arrondissement: Caen
- Canton: Troarn
- Intercommunality: CC Val ès Dunes

Government
  - Mayor (2020–2026): Joël Duguey
- Area^{1}: 4.55 km^{2} (1.76 sq mi)
- Highest elevation: 76 m (249 ft)
- Lowest elevation: 14 m (46 ft)
- Population (2023): 227
  - Density: 49.9/km^{2} (129/sq mi)
- Time zone: UTC+01:00 (CET)
  - Summer (DST): UTC+02:00 (CEST)
- INSEE/Postal code: 14482 /14270
- ^{1} French Land Register data, which excludes lakes, ponds, glaciers > 1 km^{2} (0.386 sq mi or 247 acres) and river estuaries.

Ouézy (French pronunciation: [wezi]) is a commune in the Calvados department, in the Normandy region in northwestern France.

== History ==
On 1 January 1972, Ouézy and Cesny-aux-Vignes were amalgamated to become the commune of Cesny-aux-Vignes-Ouézy, but on 1 January 2006, Ouézy and Cesny-aux-Vignes were reestablished as two separate communes.

== Population ==
Historical population
Year	Pop.	±% p.a.
1968	191	—
1975	193	+0.15%
1982	195	+0.15%
1990	197	+0.13%
1999	199	+0.11%
2007	238	+2.26%
2012	217	−1.83%
2017	239	+1.95%
2023	227	−0.85%
Source: INSEE

== See also ==
- Communes of the Calvados department
