= Acqueville, Calvados =

Acqueville
- Part of Cesny-les-Sources
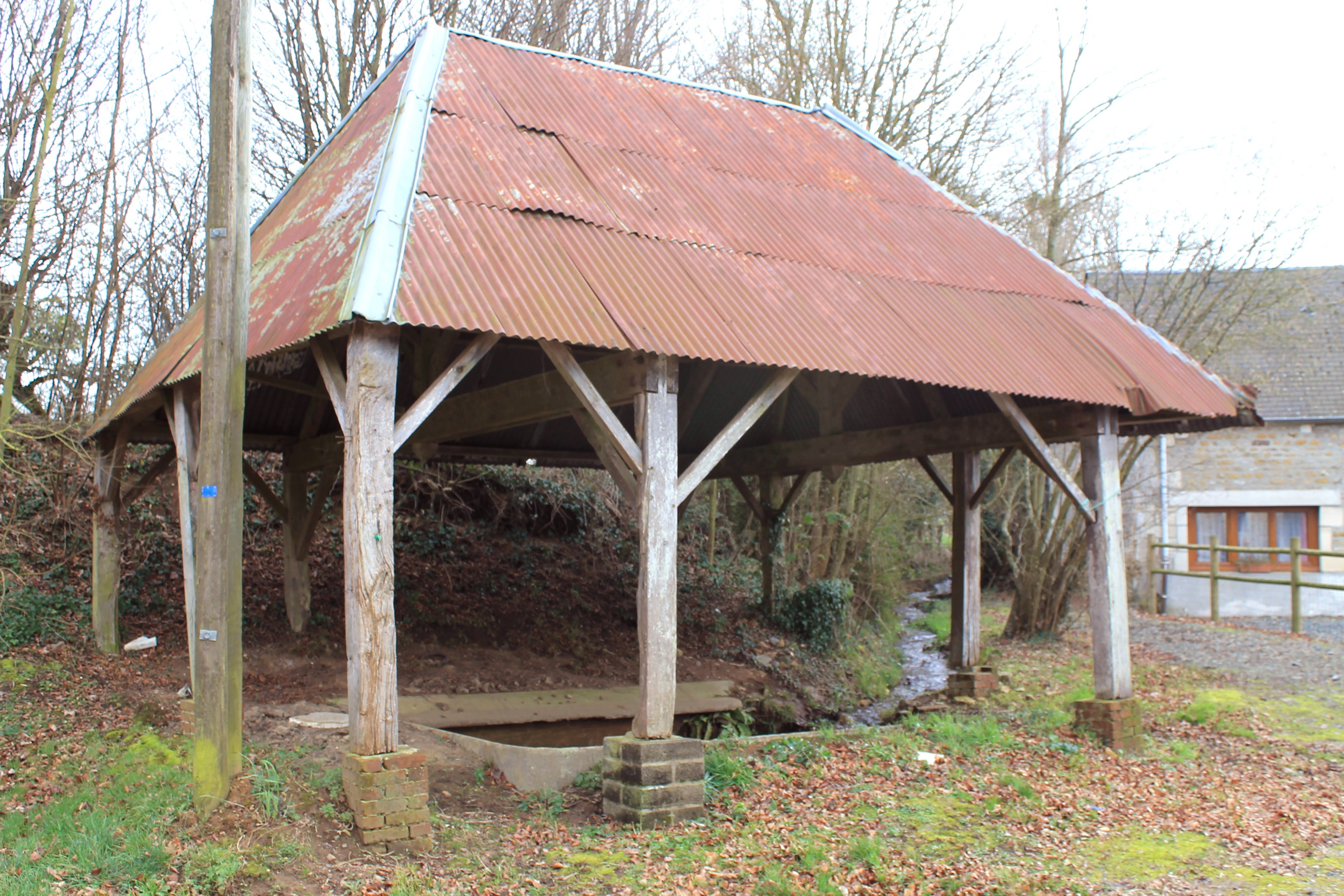
- The lavoir at Acqueville
- Location of Acqueville
- Location within France Location within Normandy
- Coordinates: 48°58′20″N 0°21′56″W
- Country: France
- Region: Normandy
- Department: Calvados
- Arrondissement: Caen
- Canton: Le Hom
- Commune: Cesny-les-Sources
- Area^{1}: 6.65 km^{2} (2.57 sq mi)
- Elevation: 150 m (490 ft)
- Highest elevation: 211 m (692 ft)
- Lowest elevation: 126 m (413 ft)
- Population (2022): 219
  - Density: 32.9/km^{2} (85.3/sq mi)
- Time zone: UTC+01:00 (CET)
  - Summer (DST): UTC+02:00 (CEST)
- Postal code: 14220
- ^{1} French Land Register data, which excludes lakes, ponds, glaciers > 1 km^{2} (0.386 sq mi or 247 acres) and river estuaries.

Acqueville (French pronunciation: [akvil]) is a former commune in the Calvados department in the Normandy region of northwestern France. On 1 January 2019, it was merged into the new commune of Cesny-les-Sources.

== Geography ==
Acqueville is located some 25 km south of Caen and 10 km east of Thury-Harcourt. It lies in a flat farming area on the D157 road which runs south from Cesny-Bois-Halbout through the centre of Acqueville south to join the D6 which forms the southern border of the commune. The north-western border of Acqueville is formed by Highway D23 while the north-eastern border is Highway D156. In the east and west the border is formed by several country roads. Apart from the village there are the hamlets of L'Outre in the west, Puant in the east, and Le Buisson in the south-west.

The Ruisseau de Bactot flows through the commune from south-west to north-east where it continues to join the Laize north-east of Moulines.

=== Toponymy ===
Acqueville was called Akevilla in 1204: the German or Scandinavian anthroponym Aki or Aka, and in Latin a "rural villa".

== Administration ==
List of Successive Mayors of Acqueville

Mayors from 1939

From	To	Name	Party	Position
1939	1942	Louis Abavent		
1942	1947	Jean Thibault		
1947	1953	Lucien Bouin		
1953	1977	Jean Thibault		
1977	1995	Maurice Thibault		
1995	2014	Denise Bouin	SE	Bank Employee
2014	31 December 2018	Isabelle Onraed		

Mayors from the French Revolution to 1939

From	To	Name	Party	Position
1797	1809	Gabriel Riviere		
1809	1830	Louis de Folleville		
1830	1833	Gabriel Riviere		
1833	1844	Charles Garnier		
1844	1847	Louis de Folleville		
1847	1850	Charles Garnier		
1850	1871	Louis Lepeltier		
1871	1872	François Beaunieux		
1872	1900	Pierre Simon		
1900	1913	Auguste Thibault		
1913	1919	Oriot		
1919	1939	Auguste Thibault		

The council was composed of eleven members, including the mayor and two deputies.

== Population ==
The inhabitants of Acqueville are known as Acquevillais or Acquevillaises in French.

Historical population

Year	Pop.	±% p.a.
1793	529	—
1800	441	−2.57%
1806	502	+2.18%
1821	453	−0.68%
1831	466	+0.28%
1836	440	−1.14%
1841	423	−0.78%
1846	410	−0.62%
1851	379	−1.56%
1856	374	−0.27%
1861	368	−0.32%
1866	350	−1.00%
1872	323	−1.33%
1876	331	+0.61%
1881	283	−3.08%
1886	266	−1.23%
1891	246	−1.55%
1896	253	+0.56%

Year	Pop.	±% p.a.
1901	249	−0.32%
1906	244	−0.40%
1911	200	−3.90%
1921	189	−0.56%
1926	189	+0.00%
1931	183	−0.64%
1936	176	−0.78%
1946	157	−1.14%
1954	165	+0.62%
1962	184	+1.37%
1968	146	−3.78%
1975	144	−0.20%
1982	170	+2.40%
1990	211	+2.74%
1999	178	−1.87%
2007	159	−1.40%
2012	188	+3.41%
2022	219	+1.54%

Source: EHESS and INSEE

== Culture and heritage ==
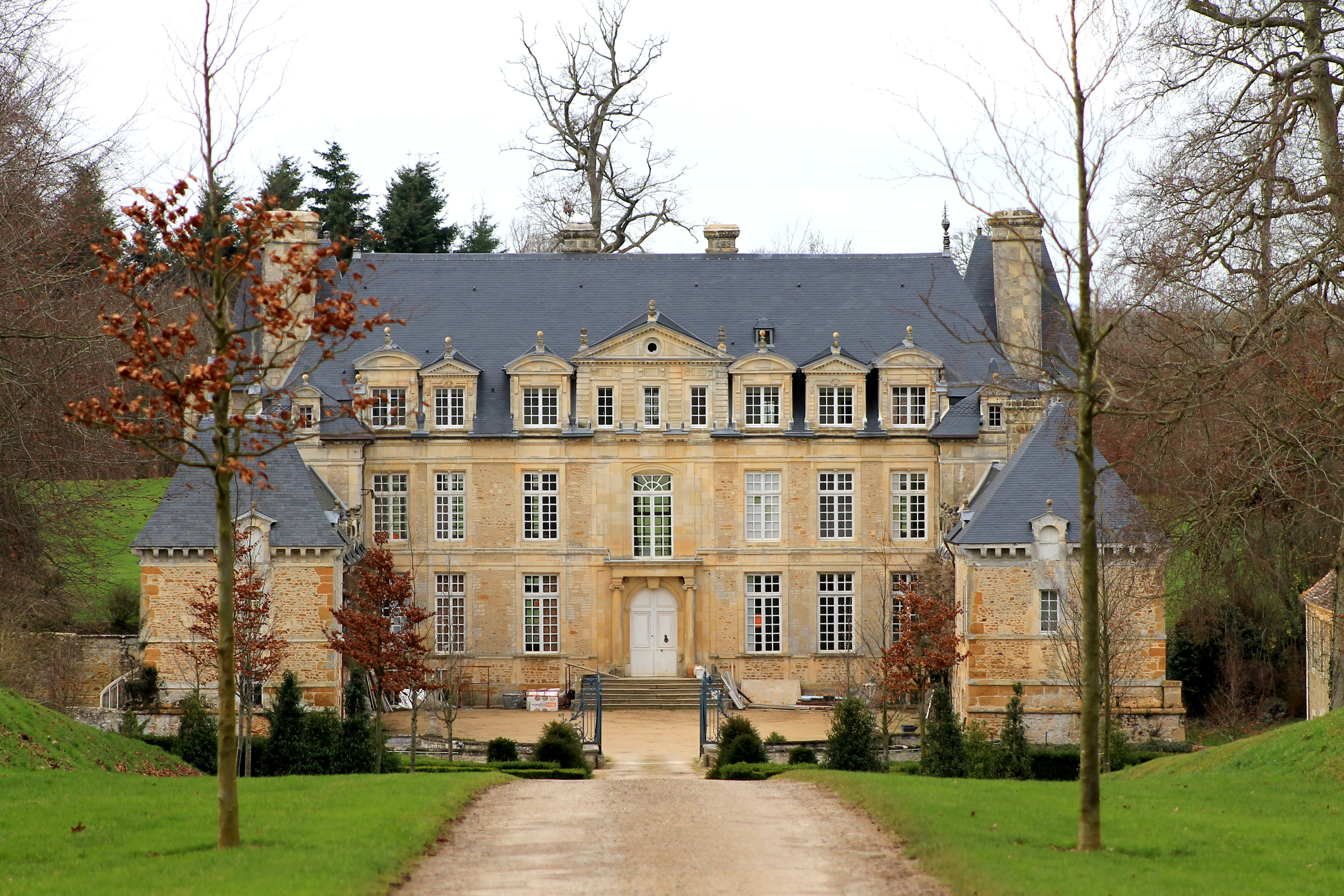
Chateau de la Motte

=== Civil heritage ===
The commune has a number of buildings and structures that are registered as historical monuments:

- A Farmhouse at Puant (1760)
- The Chateau de la Motte (1614 and 1694)
- The Park of the Chateau de la Motte (16th century)
- A Farmhouse at la Cour Fontaine (18th century)
- A Farmhouse (1783)
- A House (18th century)
- Houses and Farms (17th to 19th centuries)
- A Manor House (15th century)

=== Religious heritage ===
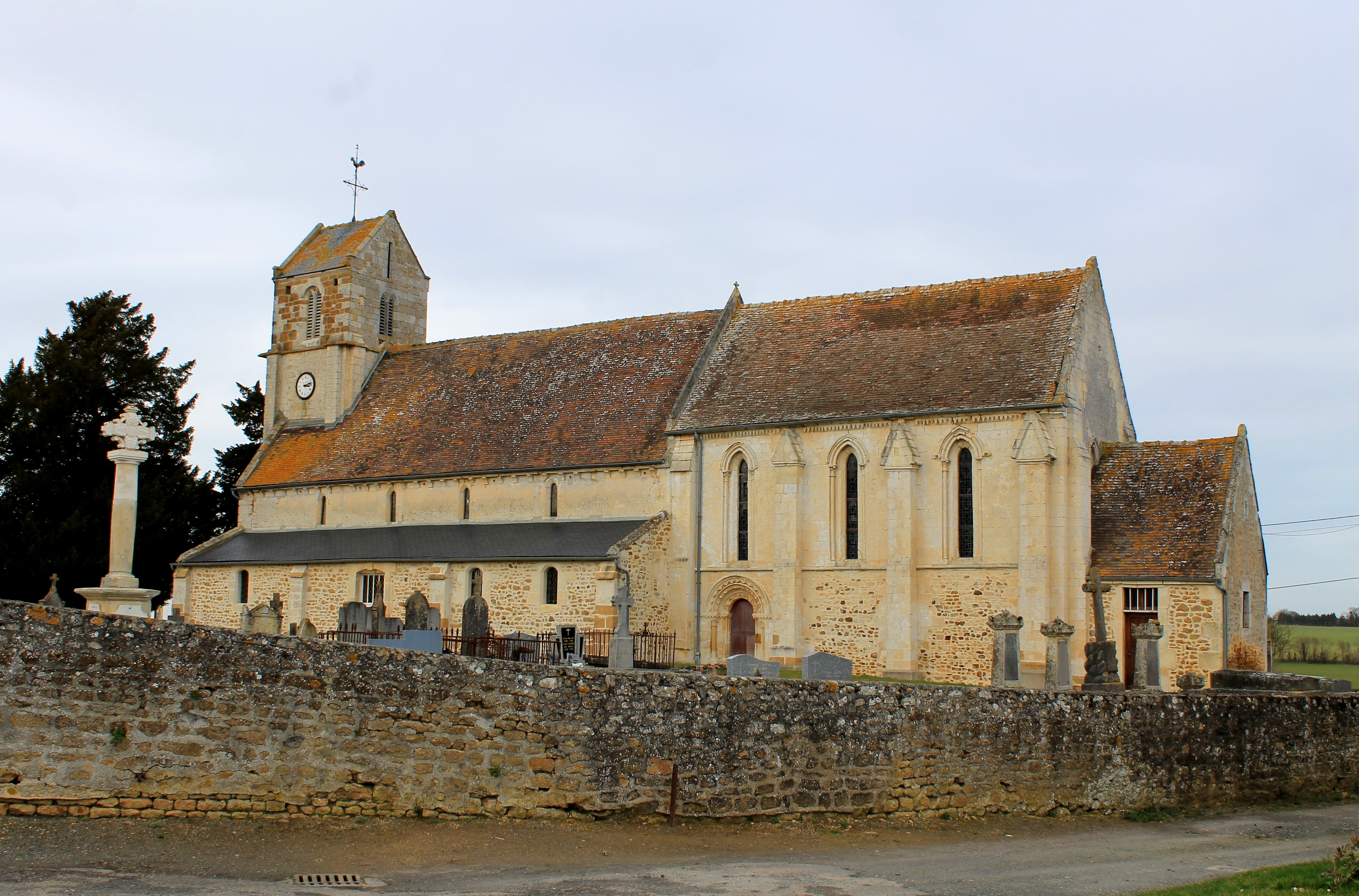
Church of Saint Aubin

The commune has two religious buildings and structures that are registered as historical monuments:

- The Church of Saint-Aubin (13th century)
- A Cemetery Cross at the Church of Saint-Aubin (18th century)
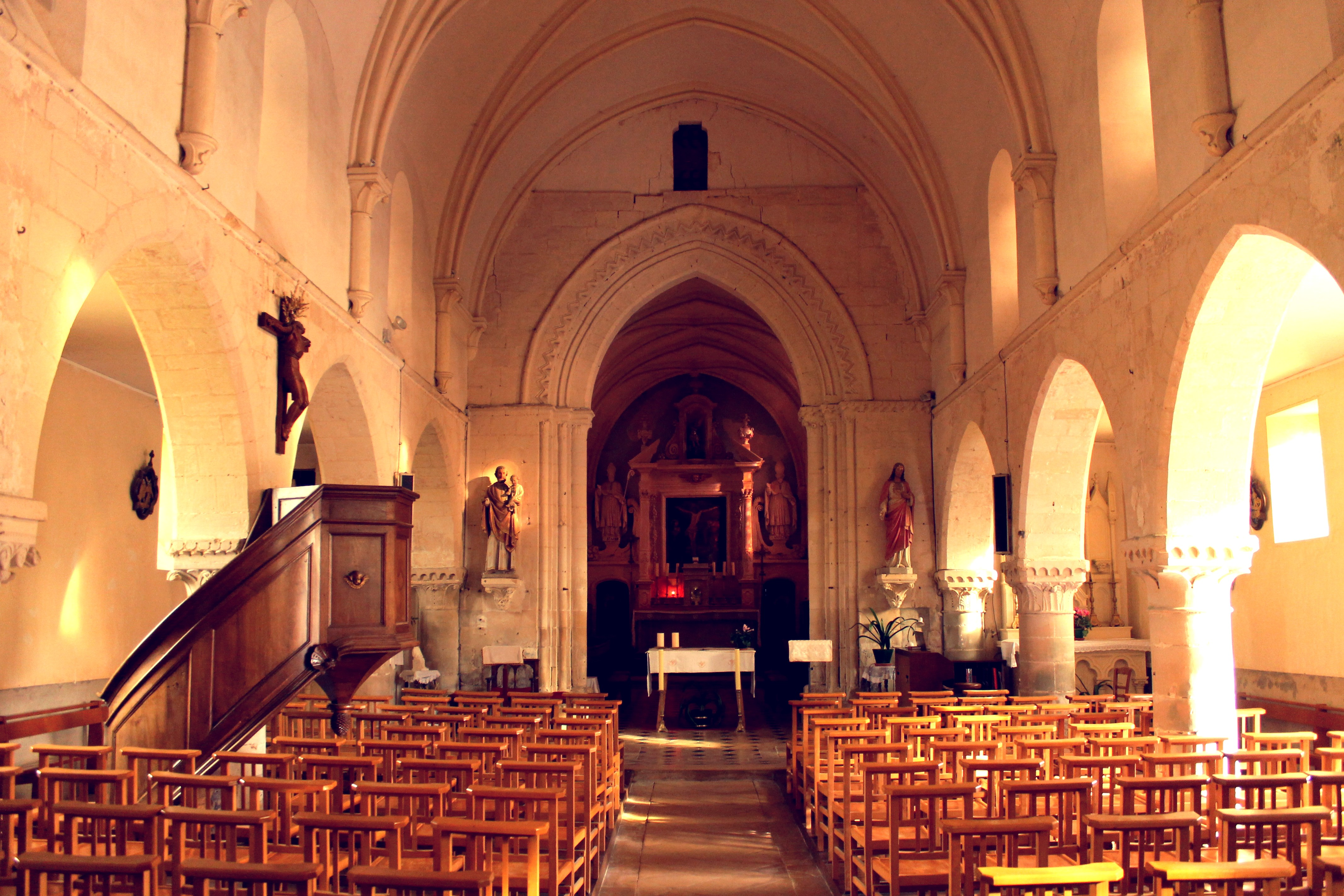
Church of Saint Aubin Interior

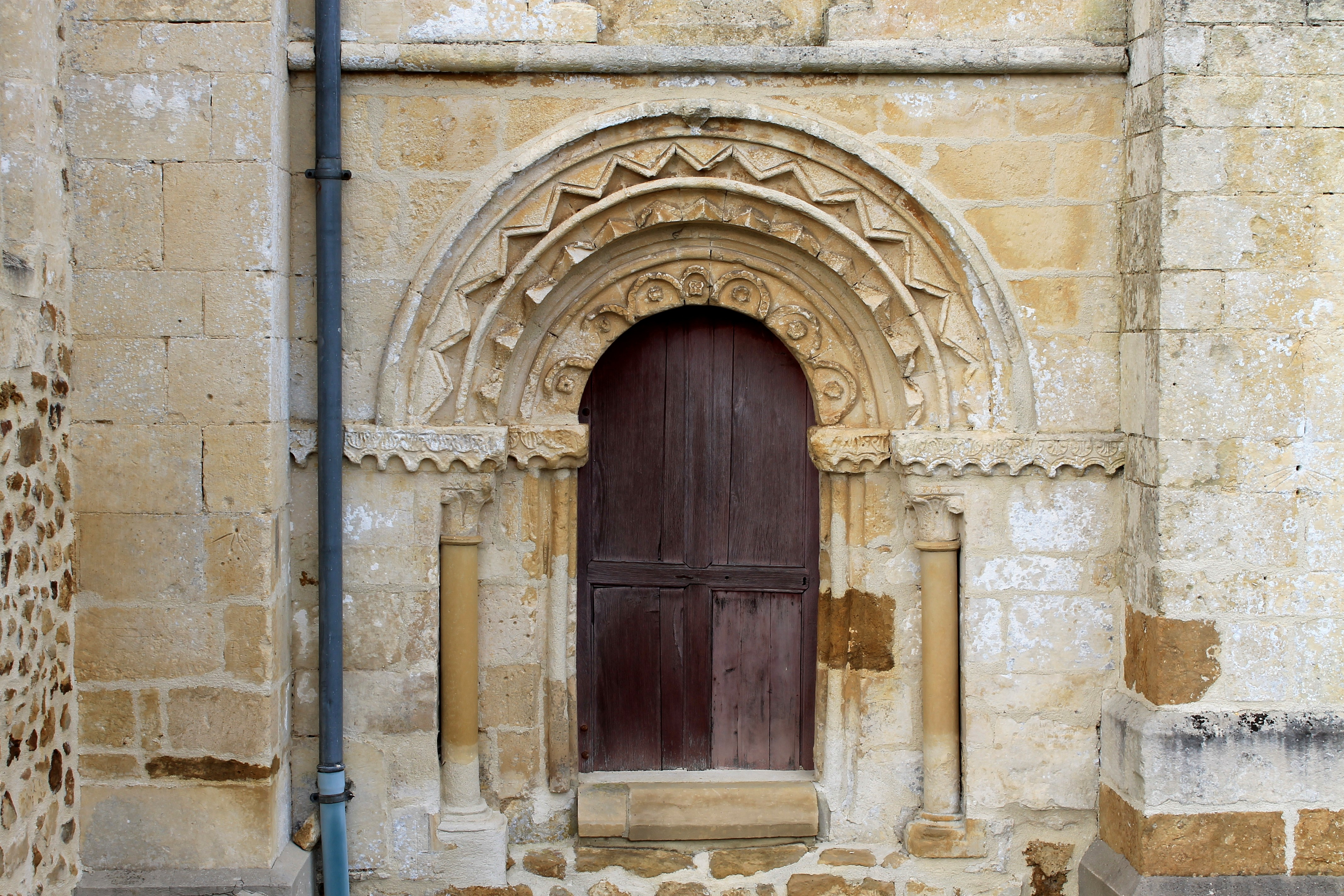
Church of Saint Aubin south entrance

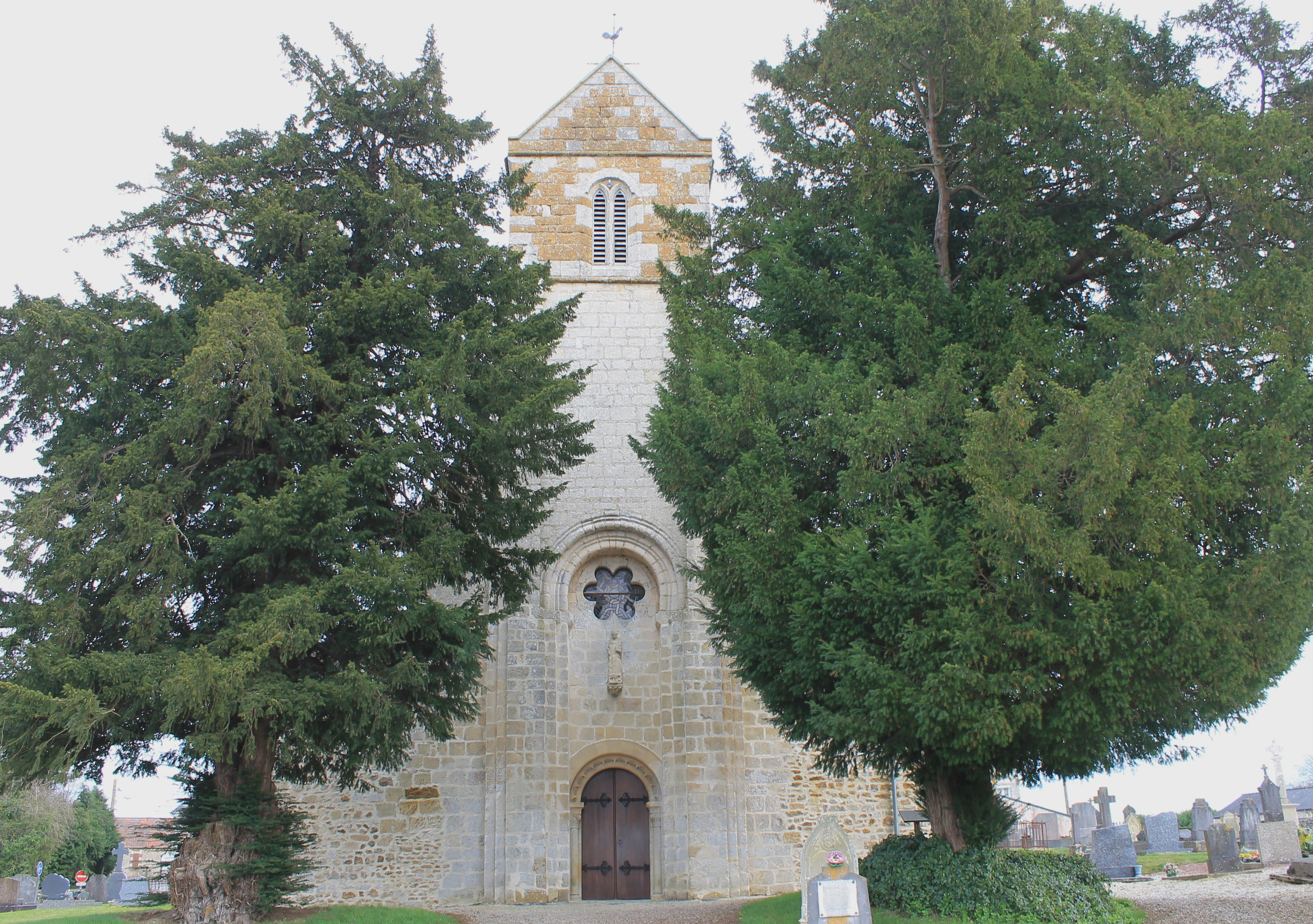
Church of Saint Aubon west entrance

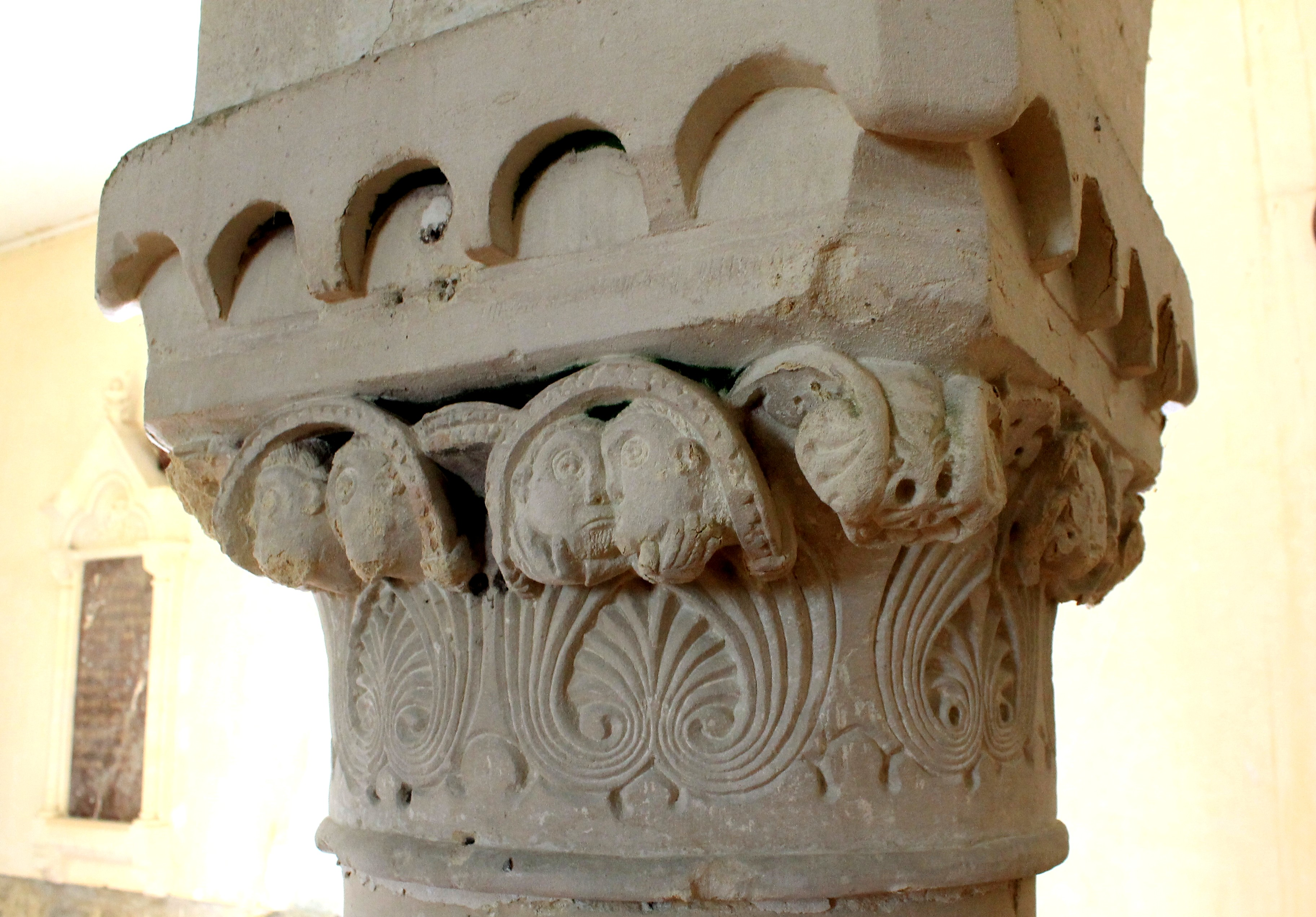
Capital in the Church of Saint Aubin

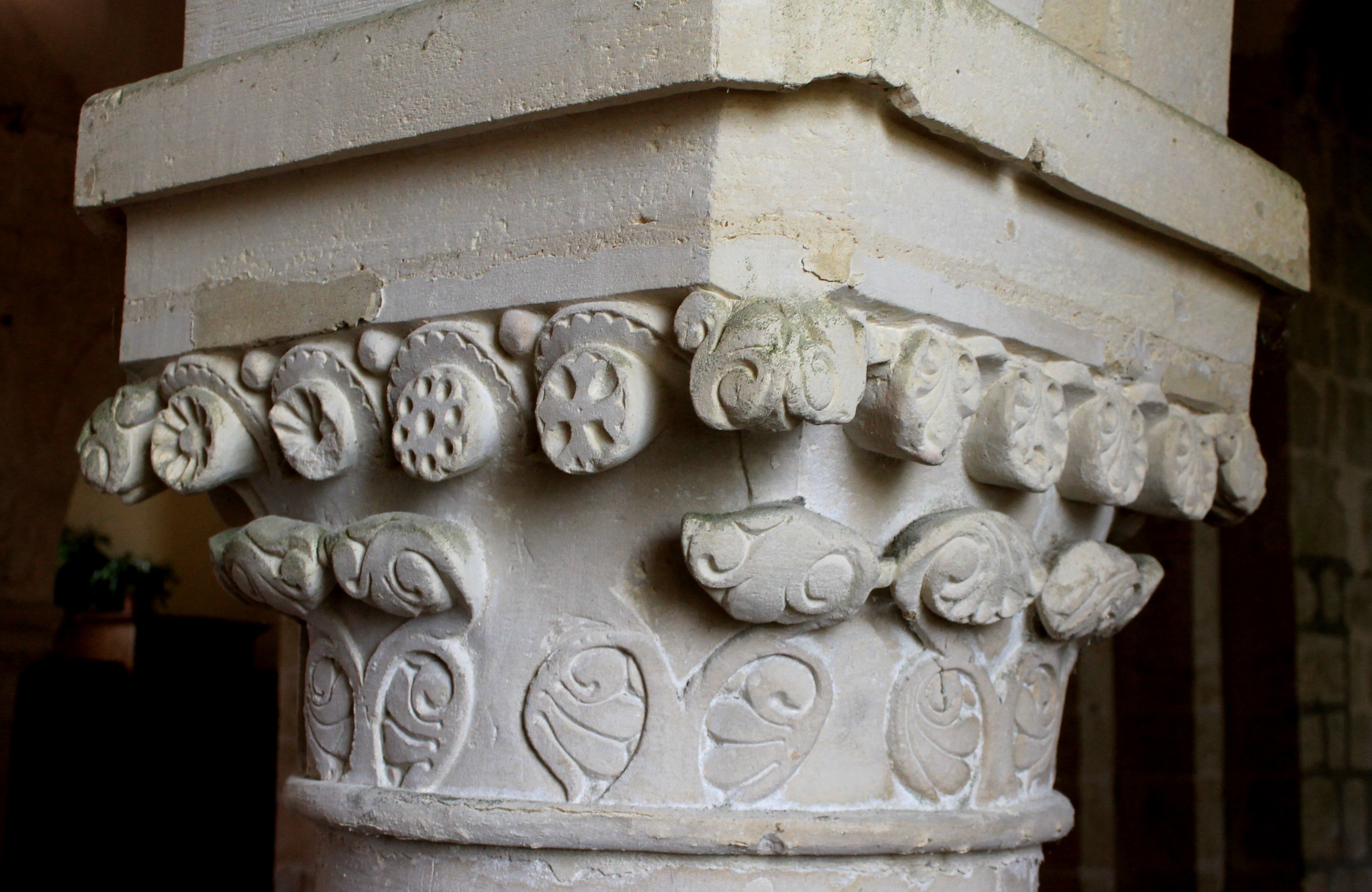
Capital in the Church of Saint Aubin

== Bibliography ==
- Arcisse de Caumont, Monumental Statistics of Calvados, Ed. Hardel, Caen, 1850, Pages 564–567

== See also ==
- Communes of the Calvados department
