= Valambray =

- Commune
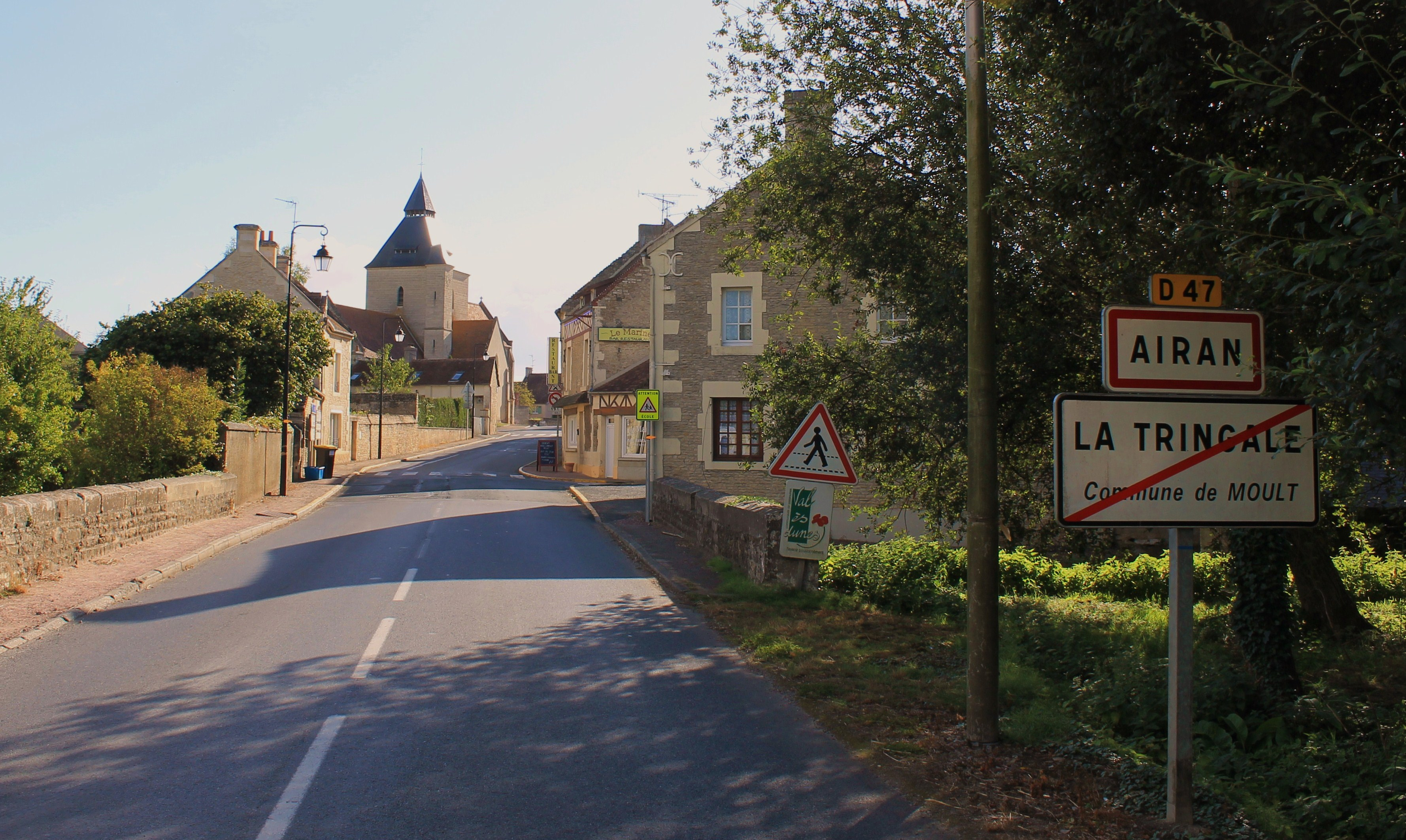
- The road into Airan
- Location of Valambray
- Location within France Location within Normandy
- Coordinates: 49°06′04″N 0°09′07″W
- Country: France
- Region: Normandy
- Department: Calvados
- Arrondissement: Caen
- Canton: Troarn
- Intercommunality: CC Val ès Dunes

Government
  - Mayor (2020–2026): Patrice Martin
- Area^{1}: 41.16 km^{2} (15.89 sq mi)
- Population (2023): 1,682
  - Density: 40.86/km^{2} (105.8/sq mi)
- Time zone: UTC+01:00 (CET)
  - Summer (DST): UTC+02:00 (CEST)
- INSEE/Postal code: 14005 /14370
- ^{1} French Land Register data, which excludes lakes, ponds, glaciers > 1 km^{2} (0.386 sq mi or 247 acres) and river estuaries.

Valambray (French pronunciation: [valɑ̃bʁɛ]) is a commune in the department of Calvados, northwestern France. The municipality was established on 1 January 2017 by merger of the former communes of Airan (the seat), Billy, Conteville, Fierville-Bray and Poussy-la-Campagne.

== Geography ==
The commune is made up of the following collection of villages and hamlets, Airan, Valmeray, Conteville, Billy, Poussy-la-Campagne, Bray la Campagne, Cinq Autels and Danneville.

A single watercourse, the Muance river flows through the commune.

== Points of Interest ==
=== National Heritage sites ===
The Commune has three buildings and areas listed as a Monument historique

- Église Saint-Germain twelfth century church listed as a monument in 1930.
- Château de Coupigny an eighteenth century chateau that was classed as a Monument historique in 1927.
- Moulin à eau a water mill built in 1682 to grind flour that was classed as a Monument historique in 1975.

== See also ==
- Communes of the Calvados department
