= Angoville, Calvados =

Angoville
- Part of Cesny-les-Sources
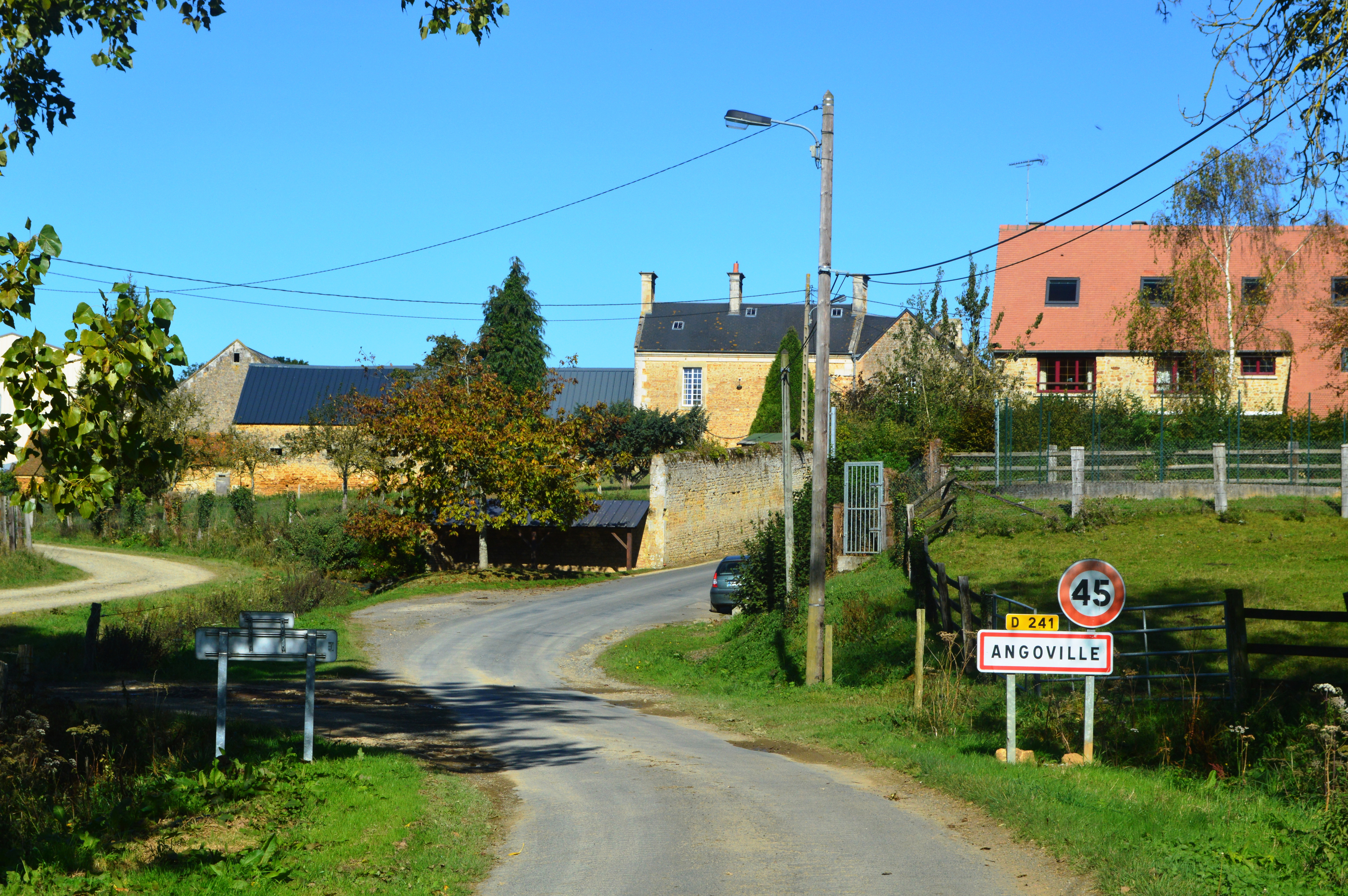
- The road into Angoville
- Location of Angoville
- Location within France Location within Normandy
- Coordinates: 48°56′45″N 0°22′39″W
- Country: France
- Region: Normandy
- Department: Calvados
- Arrondissement: Caen
- Canton: Le Hom
- Commune: Cesny-les-Sources
- Area^{1}: 3.72 km^{2} (1.44 sq mi)
- Elevation: 220 m (720 ft)
- Highest elevation: 248 m (814 ft)
- Lowest elevation: 173 m (568 ft)
- Population (2022): 24
  - Density: 6.5/km^{2} (17/sq mi)
- Time zone: UTC+01:00 (CET)
  - Summer (DST): UTC+02:00 (CEST)
- Postal code: 14220
- ^{1} French Land Register data, which excludes lakes, ponds, glaciers > 1 km^{2} (0.386 sq mi or 247 acres) and river estuaries.

Angoville (French pronunciation: [ɑ̃ɡɔvil]) is a former commune in the Calvados department in the Normandy region of north-western France. On 1 January 2019, it was merged into the new commune of Cesny-les-Sources.

== Geography ==
Angoville is located some 30 km south of Caen and 10 km east by south-east of Thury-Harcourt. The D6 road from Thury-Harcourt to Ussy forms the northern border of the commune. Access to the commune is by the D241 road from Tréprel in the south which passes through the length of the commune and the village and continues north to join the D6 on the border. The commune is mostly farmland with an area of forest in the south which is part of the large Bois de Saint-Claire.

== History ==
=== Toponymy ===
Angoville is composed of the old French "ville" (from the Latin "Villae") meaning a rural area or village and a Scandinavian name Asgaut (or Asgautr), gallicized to Asgot, Ansgot, Angot, and Ango - originally the Norman surname Ango and Angot which are widespread in Seine-Maritime.

== Administration ==
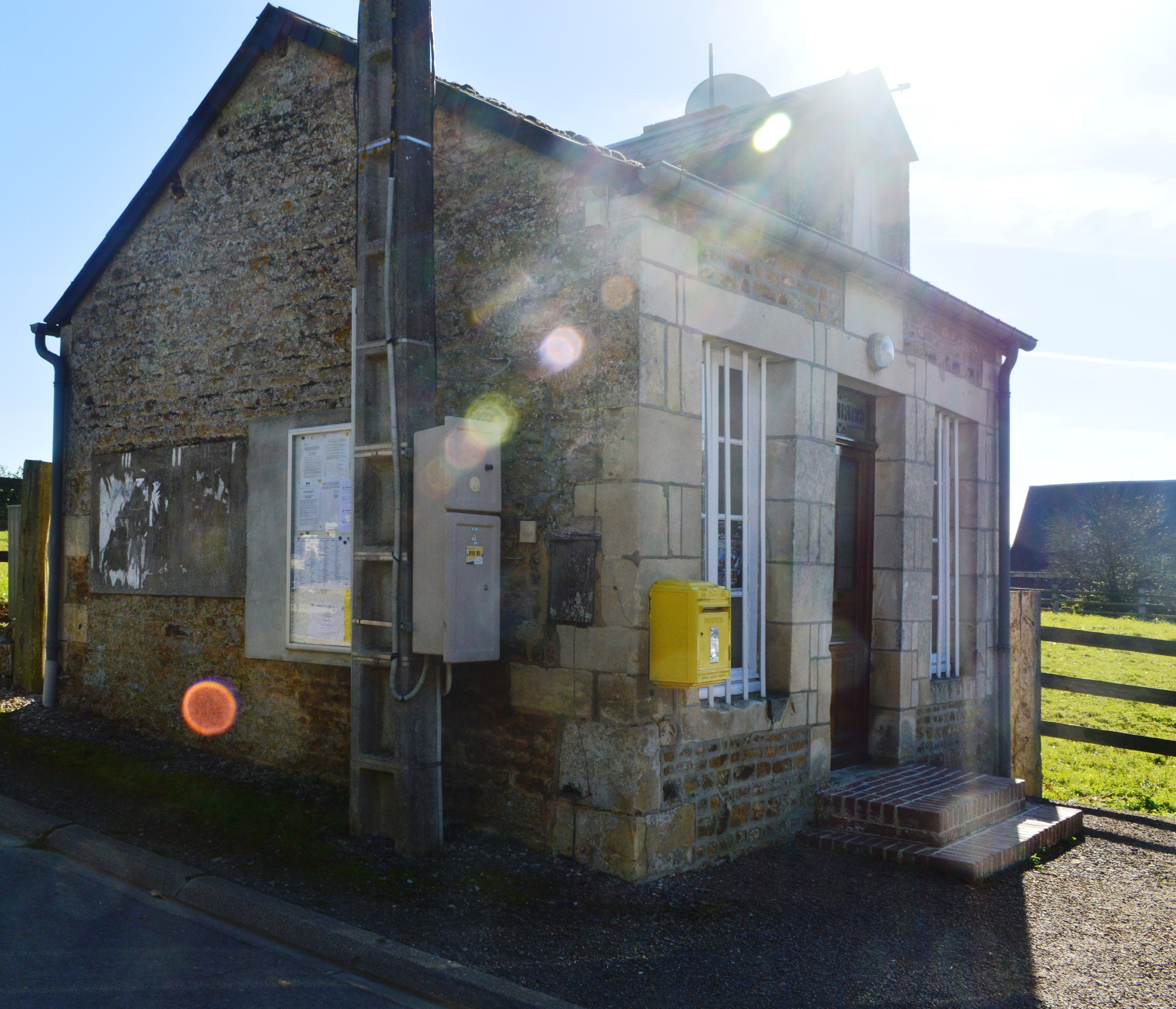
The Town Hall

List of Successive Mayors of Angoville

From	To	Name	Party	Position
?	?	Louis-Aimable Auvray		Farmer
?	?	M. Pourdais (Father)		
?	2001	Guy Bourdais		
2001	2014	Daniel Simon	SE	Farmer
2014	2019	Éric Sohier	SE	Editor

== Demography ==
The inhabitants of the commune are known as Angovillais or Angovillaises in French.

Historical population

Year	Pop.	±% p.a.
1793	203	—
1800	102	−9.36%
1806	212	+12.97%
1821	159	−1.90%
1831	140	−1.26%
1836	138	−0.29%
1841	136	−0.29%
1846	126	−1.52%
1851	110	−2.68%
1856	110	+0.00%
1861	104	−1.12%
1866	98	−1.18%
1872	97	−0.17%
1876	100	+0.76%
1881	97	−0.61%
1886	86	−2.38%
1891	87	+0.23%
1896	80	−1.66%

Year	Pop.	±% p.a.
1901	80	+0.00%
1906	80	+0.00%
1911	71	−2.36%
1921	71	+0.00%
1926	54	−5.33%
1931	50	−1.53%
1936	60	+3.71%
1946	44	−3.05%
1954	53	+2.35%
1962	64	+2.39%
1968	51	−3.71%
1975	45	−1.77%
1982	40	−1.67%
1990	29	−3.94%
1999	30	+0.38%
2007	31	+0.41%
2012	33	+1.26%
2022	24	−3.13%

Source: EHESS and INSEE

== Economy ==
The main activities are dairy farming and cropping.

== Culture and heritage ==
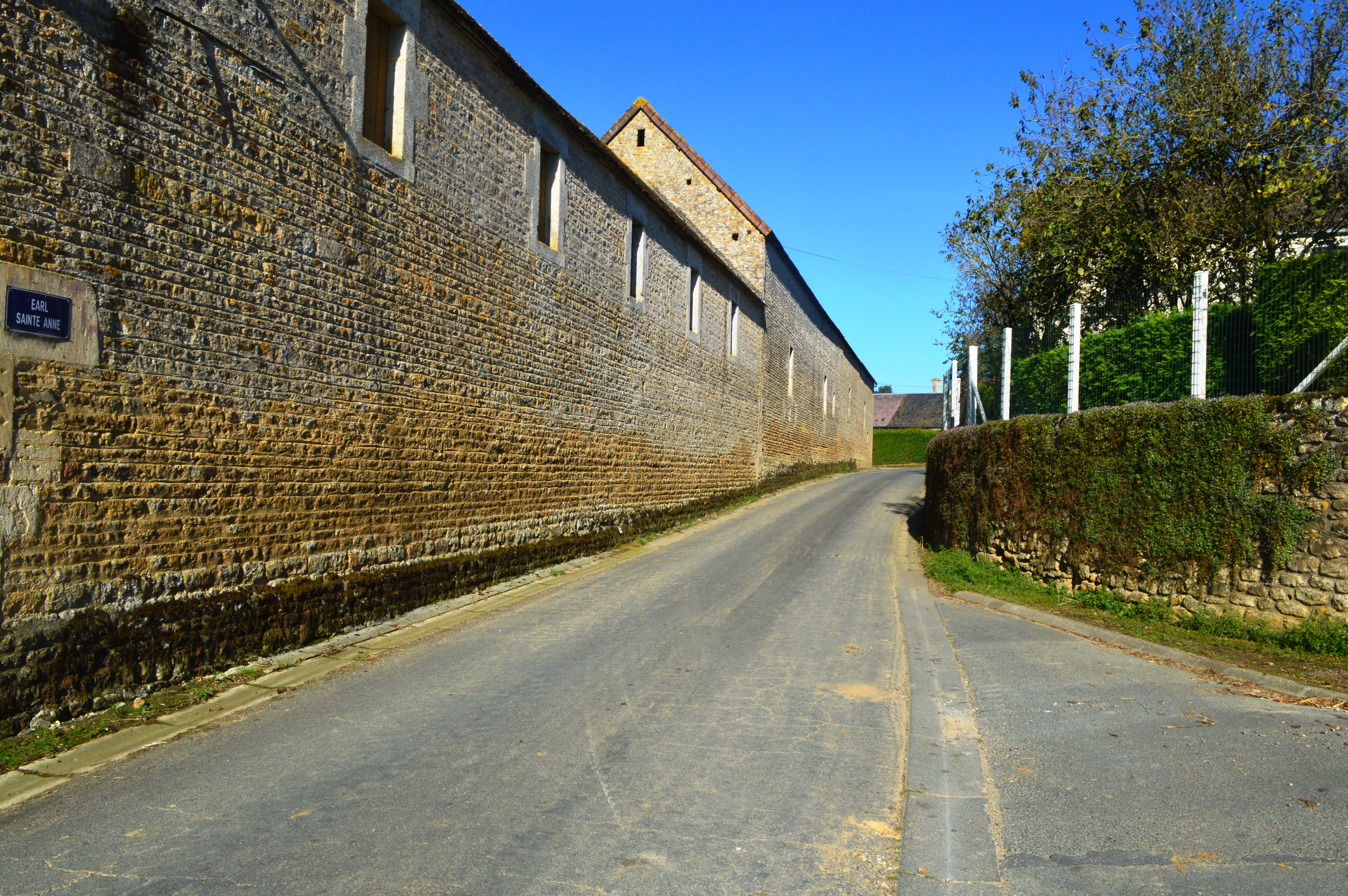
A street in Angoville

=== Civil heritage ===
The commune has a number of buildings and structures that are registered as historical monuments:

- Houses and Farms (18th-19th century)
- A Farmhouse (1786)
- The Saint Anne Fountain (1848)
- The Town Hall (19th century)
- The Motte de Rouvrou Fortified Site (11th century)

=== Religious heritage ===
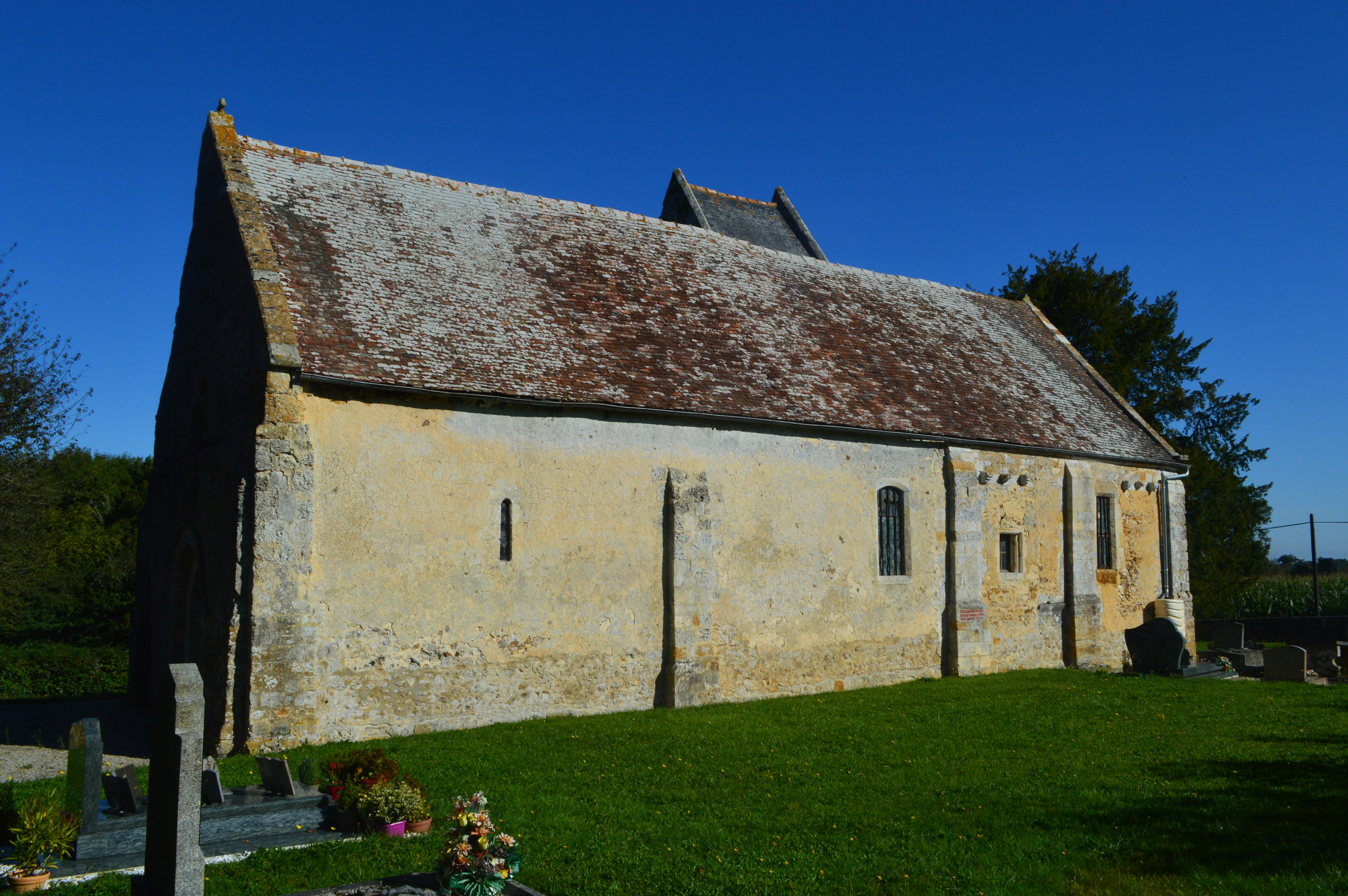
The Church of Saint Anne

The commune has several religious buildings and structures that are registered as historical monuments:

- The Tomb of the Rabâche family (19th century)
- The Tomb of Jean-François Rabâche (1816)
- The Tomb of Priest François Bouquet (1813)
- The Parish Church of Saint-Anne (12th century)

== See also ==
- Communes of the Calvados department
