= Tournebu =

- Part of Cesny-les-Sources
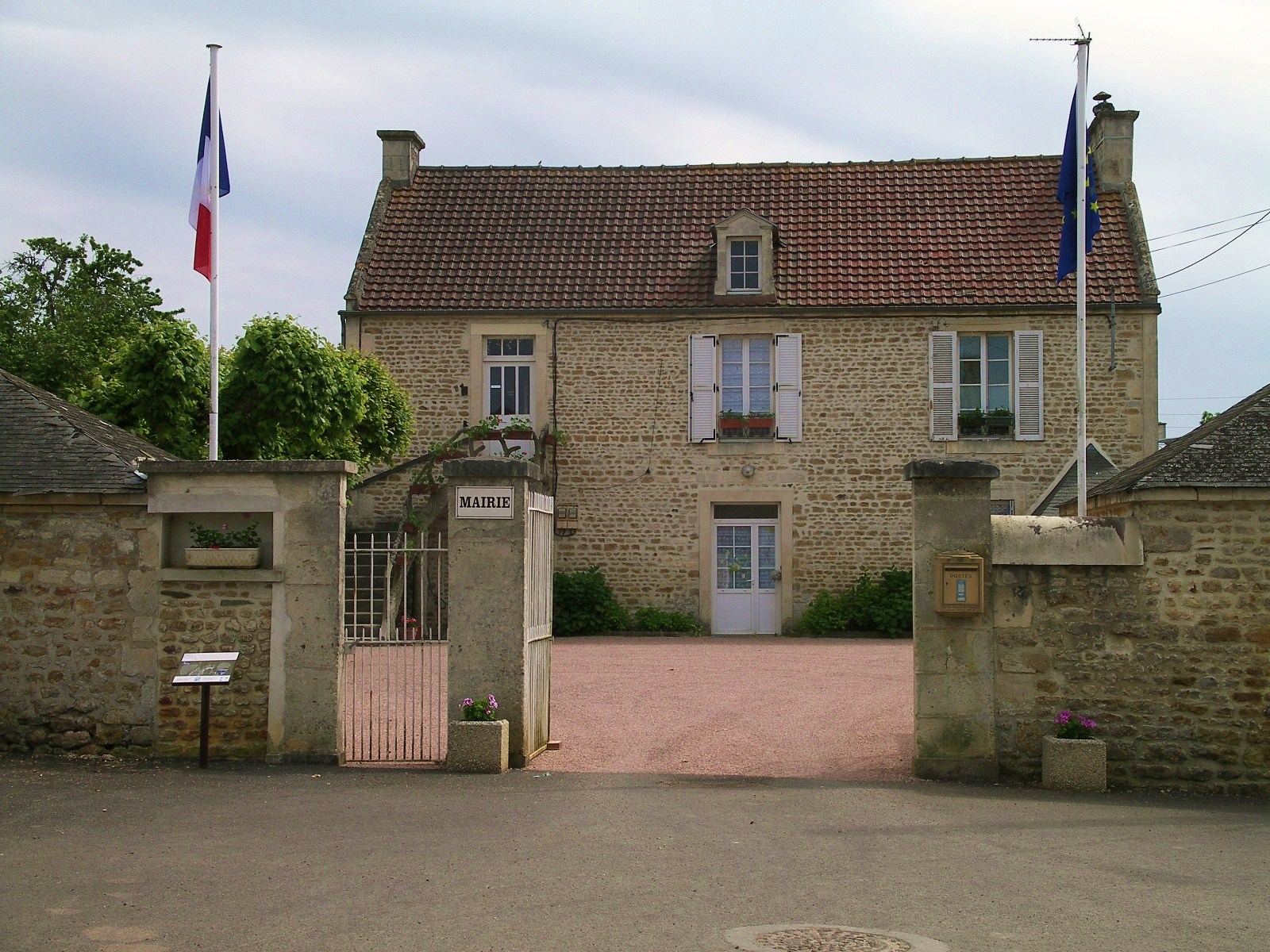
- The town hall in Tournebu
- Location of Tournebu
- Location within France Location within Normandy
- Coordinates: 48°58′11″N 0°20′22″W
- Country: France
- Region: Normandy
- Department: Calvados
- Arrondissement: Caen
- Canton: Le Hom
- Commune: Cesny-les-Sources
- Area^{1}: 11.4 km^{2} (4.4 sq mi)
- Elevation: 150 m (490 ft)
- Highest elevation: 188 m (617 ft)
- Lowest elevation: 109 m (358 ft)
- Population (2023): 370
  - Density: 32/km^{2} (84/sq mi)
- Time zone: UTC+01:00 (CET)
  - Summer (DST): UTC+02:00 (CEST)
- Postal code: 14220
- ^{1} French Land Register data, which excludes lakes, ponds, glaciers > 1 km^{2} (0.386 sq mi or 247 acres) and river estuaries.

Tournebu (French pronunciation: [tuʁnəby]) is a former commune in the Calvados department in the Normandy region in northwestern France. On 1 January 2019, it was merged into the new commune of Cesny-les-Sources.

== Sights ==
- Donjon (the keep)

== See also ==
- Communes of the Calvados department
