= Billy, Calvados =

Billy
- Part of Valambray
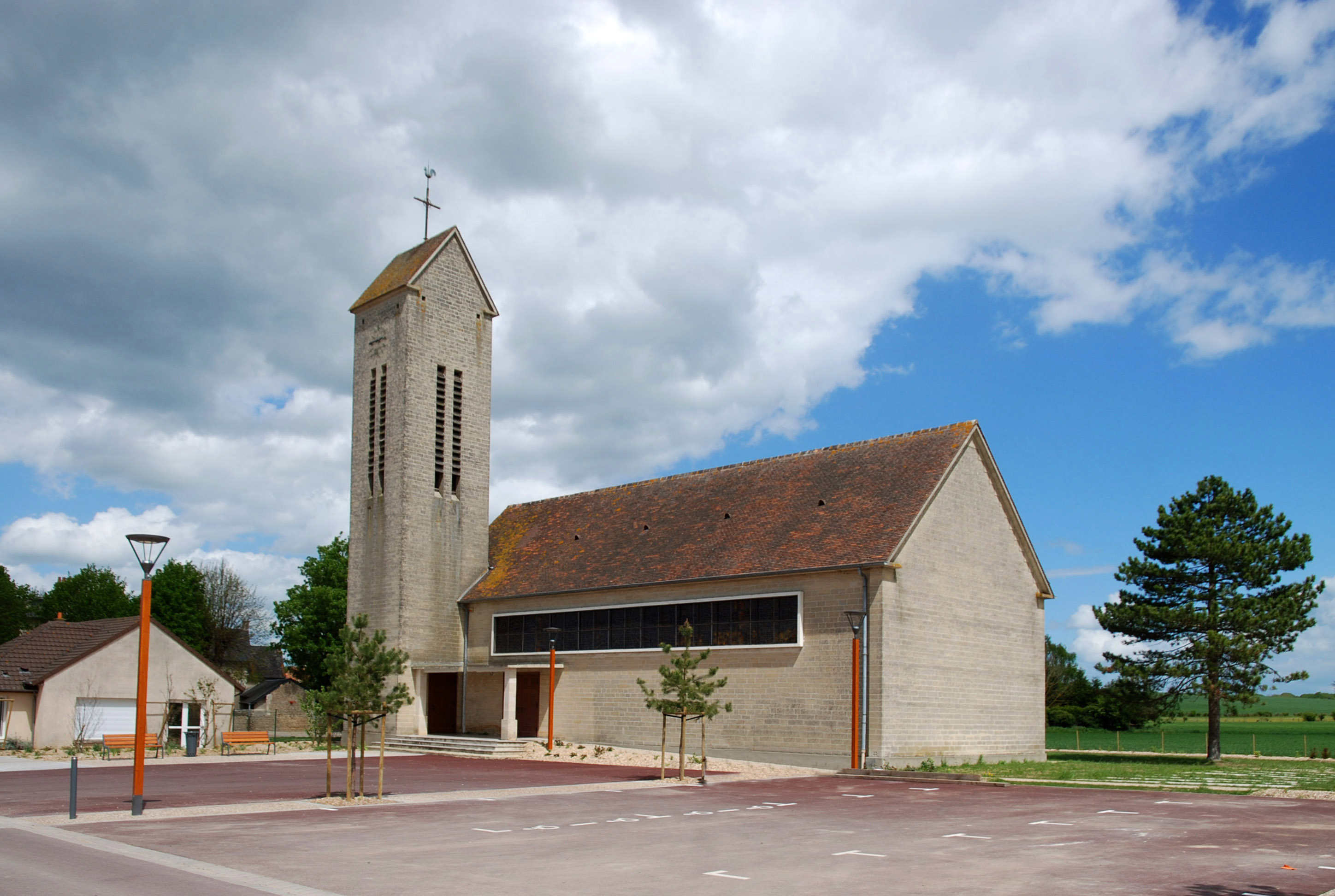
- Location of Billy
- Location within France Location within Normandy
- Coordinates: 49°05′29″N 0°11′33″W
- Country: France
- Region: Normandy
- Department: Calvados
- Arrondissement: Caen
- Canton: Troarn
- Commune: Valambray
- Area^{1}: 6.78 km^{2} (2.62 sq mi)
- Elevation: 30 m (98 ft)
- Highest elevation: 54 m (177 ft)
- Lowest elevation: 27 m (89 ft)
- Population (2023): 387
  - Density: 57.1/km^{2} (148/sq mi)
- Time zone: UTC+01:00 (CET)
  - Summer (DST): UTC+02:00 (CEST)
- Postal code: 14370
- ^{1} French Land Register data, which excludes lakes, ponds, glaciers > 1 km^{2} (0.386 sq mi or 247 acres) and river estuaries.

Billy (French pronunciation: [biji]) is a former commune in the Calvados department in the Normandy region in northwestern France. On 1 January 2017, it was merged into the new commune Valambray.

== See also ==
- Communes of the Calvados department
