= Jean Vallière =

Augustinian friar (died 1523)

- Born: 1480; Acqueville
- Died: 8 August 1523 (aged 43); Paris
- Occupation: Monk

Jean Vallière (died 8 August 1523 in Paris) was an Augustinian friar. He was burned at the stake for heresy in 1523 for supporting the teachings of Martin Luther.

== See also ==
- List of people burned as heretics
