= Cesny-les-Sources =

- Commune
- Location of Cesny-les-Sources
- Location within France Location within Normandy
- Coordinates: 48°59′13″N 0°22′39″W
- Country: France
- Region: Normandy
- Department: Calvados
- Arrondissement: Caen
- Canton: Le Hom
- Intercommunality: Cingal-Suisse Normande

Government
  - Mayor (2024–2026): Jean Vanryckeghem
- Area^{1}: 33.89 km^{2} (13.09 sq mi)
- Highest elevation: 248 m (814 ft)
- Lowest elevation: 60 m (200 ft)
- Population (2023): 1,411
  - Density: 41.63/km^{2} (107.8/sq mi)
- Time zone: UTC+01:00 (CET)
  - Summer (DST): UTC+02:00 (CEST)
- INSEE/Postal code: 14150 /14220
- ^{1} French Land Register data, which excludes lakes, ponds, glaciers > 1 km^{2} (0.386 sq mi or 247 acres) and river estuaries.

Cesny-les-Sources (French pronunciation: [sɛni le suʁs]) is a commune in the Calvados department in northwestern France. The municipality was established on 1 January 2019 by merger of the former communes of Cesny-Bois-Halbout, Acqueville, Angoville, Placy and Tournebu.

== Geography ==
The commune is part of the area known as Suisse Normande.

The commune is made up of the following collection of villages and hamlets, Les Moulins, Cesny-Bois-Halbout, Cesny, Placy, La Rue aux Daims, L'Outre, Le Mesnil, Cesny-les-Sources, Angoville, Glatigny and Clair Tison.

The river Laize runs through the commune, along with nine streams la Vieille Maison, The Pont de Combray, The Trois Minettes, The Trois Monts, The Grand Etang, The Leffard, The Bactot, The Traspy and The Martainville.

== Points of interest ==
=== National heritage sites ===
The Commune has four buildings and areas listed as a Monument historique

- Château de la Motte sixteenth century chateau, in Acqueville that was listed as a monument in 1997.
- Saint-Aubin Church thirteenth century church listed as a monument in 1933.
- Saint-Jacques Hospice twelfth century building that was also a Leper colony listed as a monument in 1932.
- Castle Remains twelfth century castle in Tournebu listed as a monument in 1927.

== Notable people ==
Jean Vallière - (1480 - 1523) an Augustinian friar was born here.

== Twin towns – sister cities ==
Cesny-Bois-Halbout is twinned with:

- Clovelly, England

== See also ==
- Communes of the Calvados department
