= Cesny-aux-Vignes-Ouézy =

Coordinates: 49°5′25″N 0°7′12″W

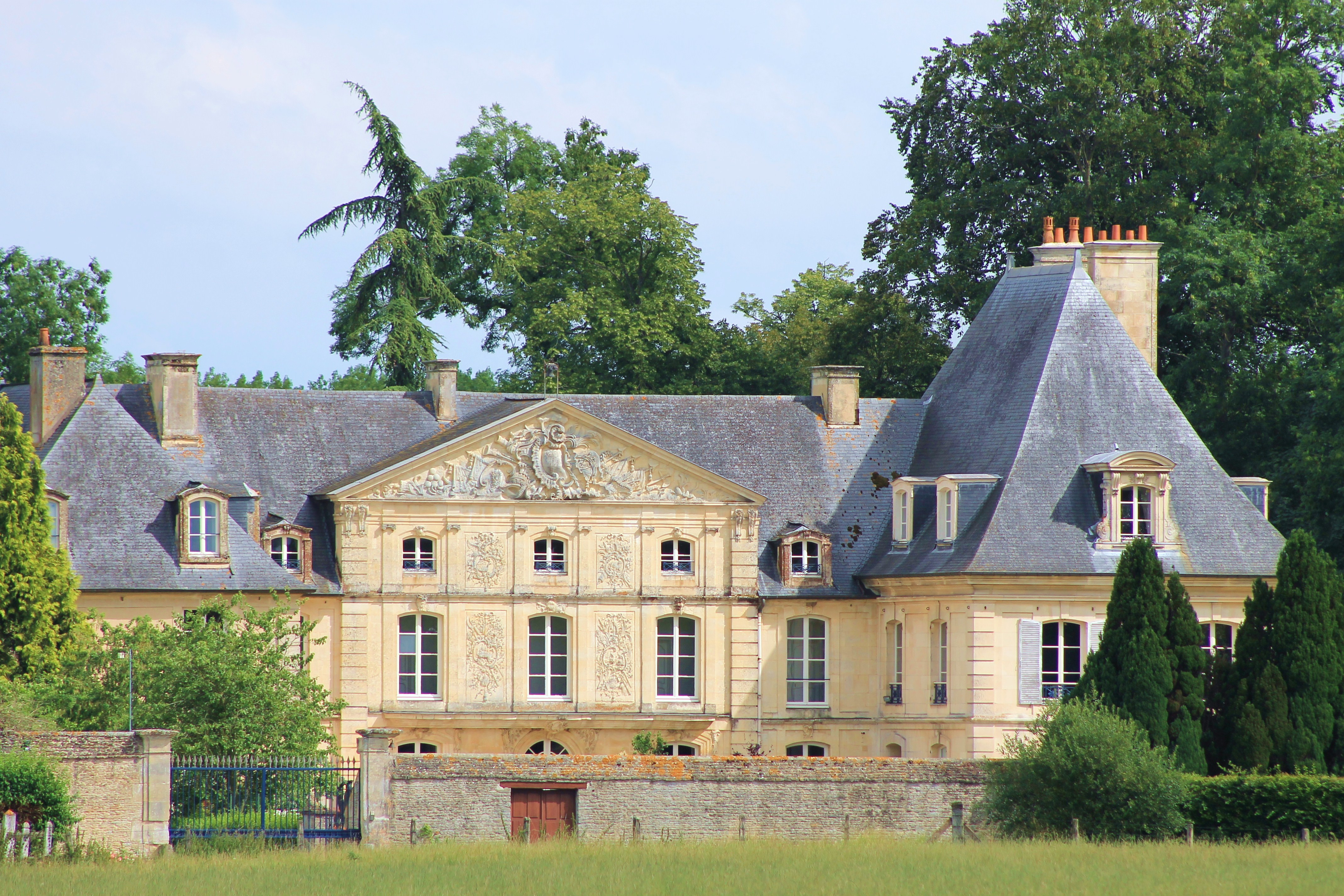
Chateau de Cesny-aux-Vignes

Cesny-aux-Vignes-Ouézy was a commune of the Calvados department, France, created on 1 January 1972 from the amalgamation of the communes of Cesny-aux-Vignes and Ouézy. On 1 January 2006, the commune was disestablished when it was split into the two original communes of Cesny-aux-Vignes and Ouézy.
