= Cesny-aux-Vignes =

- Commune
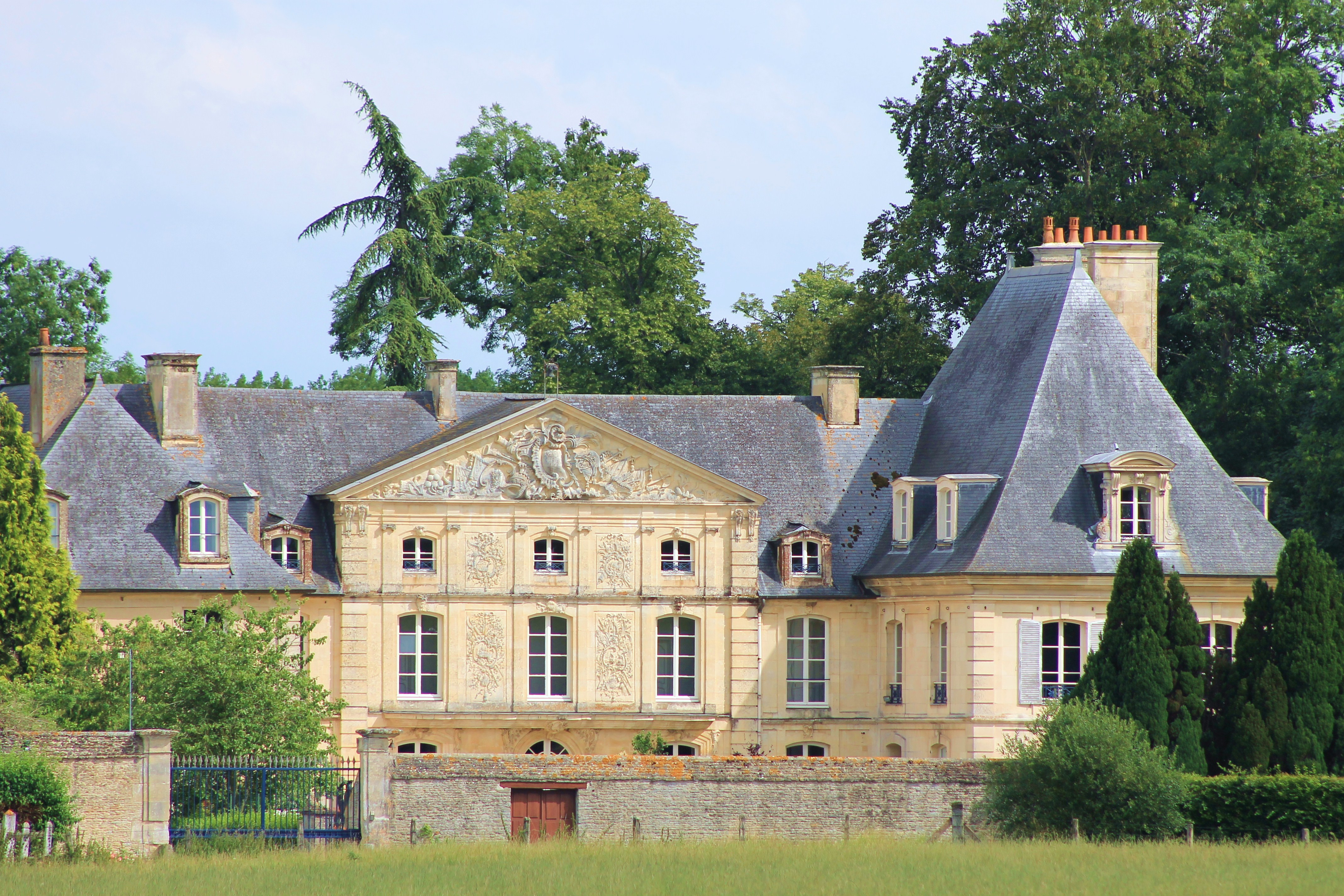
- The chateau in Cesny-aux-Vignes

- Coat of arms
- Location of Cesny-aux-Vignes
- Location within France Location within Normandy
- Coordinates: 49°05′25″N 0°07′12″W
- Country: France
- Region: Normandy
- Department: Calvados
- Arrondissement: Caen
- Canton: Troarn
- Intercommunality: CC Val ès Dunes

Government
  - Mayor (2020–2026): Éric Duval
- Area^{1}: 4.19 km^{2} (1.62 sq mi)
- Highest elevation: 76 m (249 ft)
- Lowest elevation: 14 m (46 ft)
- Population (2023): 421
  - Density: 100/km^{2} (260/sq mi)
- Time zone: UTC+01:00 (CET)
  - Summer (DST): UTC+02:00 (CEST)
- INSEE/Postal code: 14149 /14270
- ^{1} French Land Register data, which excludes lakes, ponds, glaciers > 1 km^{2} (0.386 sq mi or 247 acres) and river estuaries.

Cesny-aux-Vignes (French pronunciation: [sɛni o viɲ]) is a commune in the Calvados department in the Normandy region in northwestern France.

On 1 January 1972, Ouézy and Cesny-aux-Vignes were amalgamated to become the commune of Cesny-aux-Vignes-Ouézy, but on 1 January 2006, Ouézy and Cesny-aux-Vignes were re-established as two separate communes.

== See also ==
- Communes of the Calvados department
