= Fierville-Bray =

- Part of Valambray
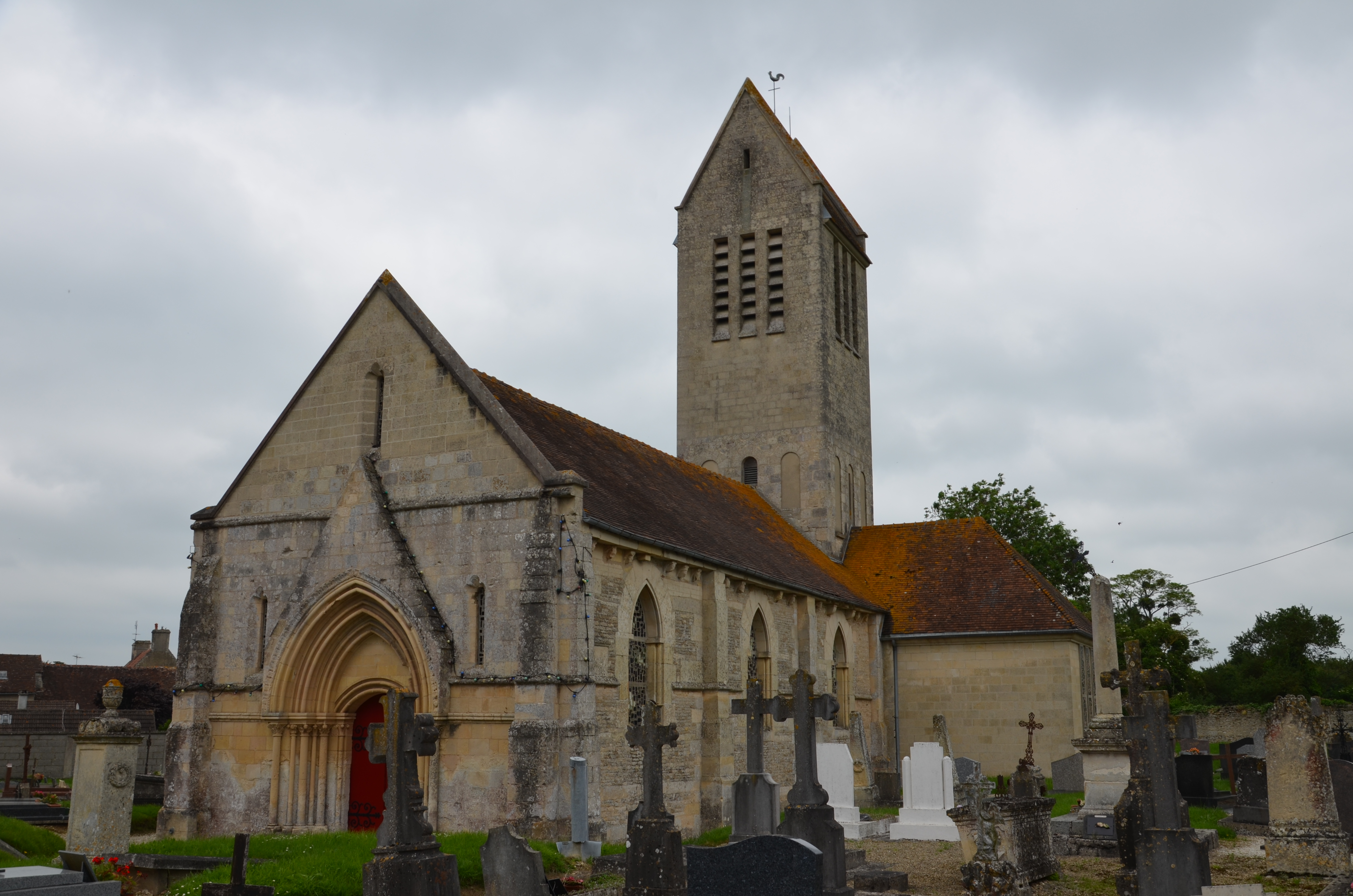
- Location of Fierville-Bray
- Location within France Location within Normandy
- Coordinates: 49°04′11″N 0°11′17″W
- Country: France
- Region: Normandy
- Department: Calvados
- Arrondissement: Caen
- Canton: Troarn
- Commune: Valambray
- Area^{1}: 12.66 km^{2} (4.89 sq mi)
- Elevation: 50 m (160 ft)
- Highest elevation: 84 m (276 ft)
- Lowest elevation: 29 m (95 ft)
- Population (2023): 465
  - Density: 36.7/km^{2} (95.1/sq mi)
- Time zone: UTC+01:00 (CET)
  - Summer (DST): UTC+02:00 (CEST)
- Postal code: 14190
- ^{1} French Land Register data, which excludes lakes, ponds, glaciers > 1 km^{2} (0.386 sq mi or 247 acres) and river estuaries.

Fierville-Bray (French pronunciation: [fjɛʁvil bʁɛ]) is a former commune in the Calvados department in the Normandy region in northwestern France. On 1 January 2017, it was merged into the new commune Valambray.

== See also ==
- Communes of the Calvados department
