= Cesny-Bois-Halbout =

- Part of Cesny-les-Sources
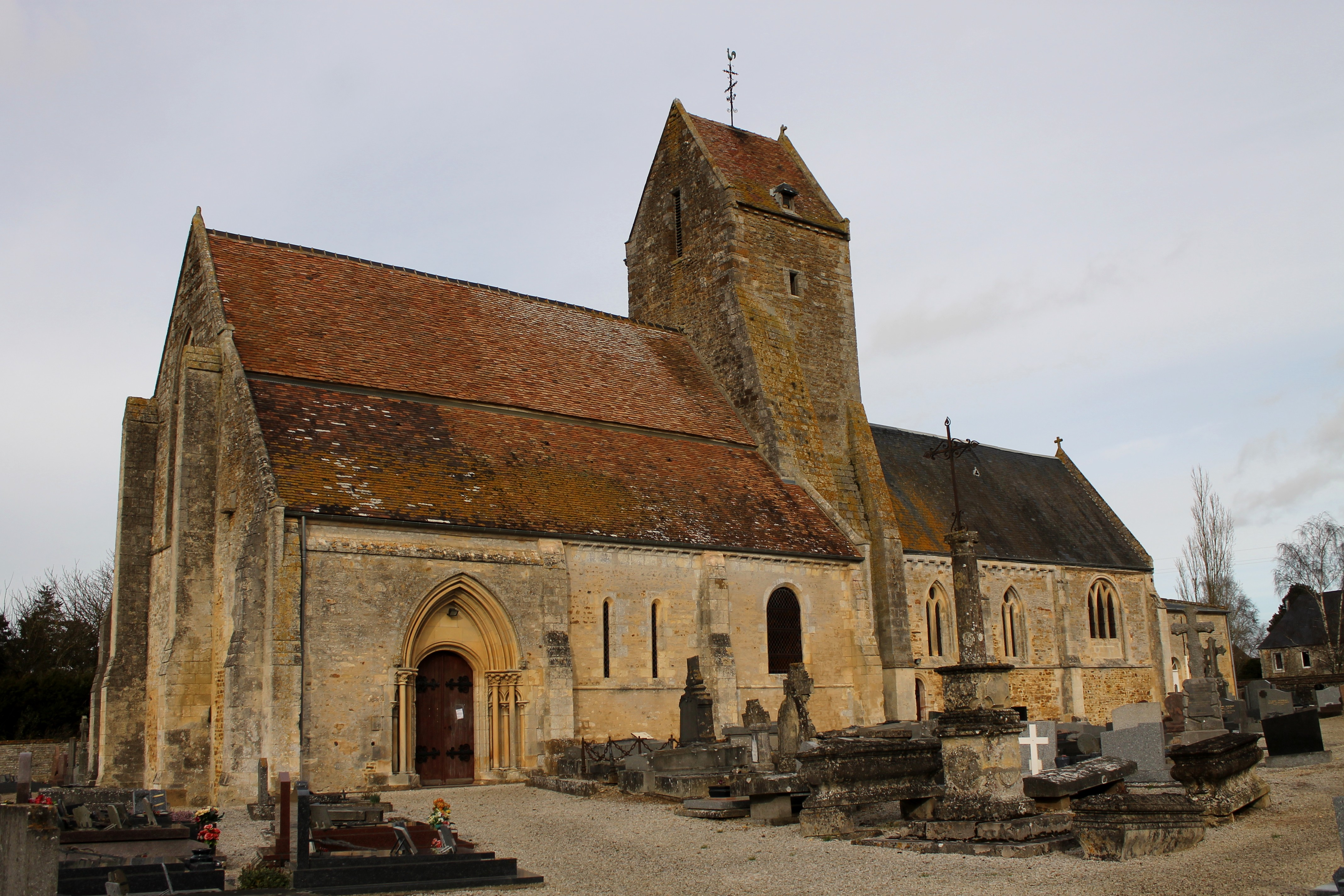
- The church in Cesny-Bois-Halbout
- Location of Cesny-Bois-Halbout
- Location within France Location within Normandy
- Coordinates: 48°59′16″N 0°22′35″W
- Country: France
- Region: Normandy
- Department: Calvados
- Arrondissement: Caen
- Canton: Le Hom
- Commune: Cesny-les-Sources
- Area^{1}: 6.66 km^{2} (2.57 sq mi)
- Elevation: 192 m (630 ft)
- Highest elevation: 206 m (676 ft)
- Lowest elevation: 115 m (377 ft)
- Population (2023): 632
  - Density: 94.9/km^{2} (246/sq mi)
- Time zone: UTC+01:00 (CET)
  - Summer (DST): UTC+02:00 (CEST)
- Postal code: 14220
- ^{1} French Land Register data, which excludes lakes, ponds, glaciers > 1 km^{2} (0.386 sq mi or 247 acres) and river estuaries.

Cesny-Bois-Halbout (French pronunciation: [sɛni bwa albu]) is a former commune in the Calvados department in the Normandy region in northwestern France. On 1 January 2019, it was merged into the new commune of Cesny-les-Sources.

== See also ==
- Communes of the Calvados department
