= Second Battle of the Odon =

1944 battle in the Second World War

- Part of Battle for Caen
- Vicinity of operations Greenline and Pomegranate
Date	15–17 July 1944
Location	Normandy, France 49°04′47″N 00°28′16″W
Result	Indecisive

Belligerents
United Kingdom	Germany

Commanders and leaders
General Miles Dempsey	General Heinrich Eberbach

Strength
6 infantry divisions 5 tank/armoured brigades	4 infantry divisions 3 Panzer divisions 1 heavy tank battalion

Casualties and losses
3,000–3,500	c. 2,000
- Évrecy, a commune in the Calvados department in the Normandy region of France

The Second Battle of the Odon comprised operations fought by the British Second Army during the Second World War. Attacks took place in mid-July 1944 against Panzergruppe West, as part of the Battle of Normandy. Operations Greenline and Pomegranate were intended to draw German attention away from Operation Goodwood, an attack from the Orne bridgehead on 18 July.

The British wanted to prevent the Germans from withdrawing panzer divisions from opposite the Second Army to create an armoured reserve which could oppose the First US Army during the Operation Cobra offensive in the west. The operations in the Odon valley kept three German armoured divisions in the front line west of Caen, away from the Goodwood battlefield, east of the Orne. (Note: Published information on the operations is sparse and has been gleaned from many sources, which has made a comprehensive narrative difficult to write.)

== Background ==
=== Operation Overlord ===
The Norman town of Caen was a D-Day objective for the 3rd British Infantry Division, which landed on Sword Beach on 6 June 1944. The capture of Caen, while "ambitious", was the most important D-Day objective assigned to I Corps. Operation Overlord called for the British Second Army to secure the city and then form a front from Caumont-l'Éventé to the south-east of Caen, to protect the left flank of the US First Army at the west end of the bridgehead and occupy ground suitable for airfields for the tactical air forces. Caen and its surroundings would give the Second Army a jumping-off point for an advance southwards to capture Falaise, for a swing right to advance on Argentan and the Touques River.

The terrain between Caen and Vimont was especially promising for mobile operations, being open and dry. Since the Allied forces greatly outnumbered the Germans in tanks and mobile units, a battle of manoeuvre would be to their advantage. Hampered by congestion in the beachhead that delayed the deployment of its armoured support and forced to divert effort to attacking strongly held German positions along the 9.3 mi (15.0 km) route to the town, the 3rd Division was unable to assault Caen in force, and advanced no further than Lebisey Wood. Operation Perch, a pincer attack by I and XXX Corps, began on 7 June with the intention of encircling Caen from the east and west. I Corps attacked southwards from the Orne bridgehead, but was halted by the 21st Panzer Division, after advancing a short distance and the attack by XXX Corps bogged down in front of Tilly-sur-Seulles, west of Caen against the defences of the Panzer-Lehr Division.

From 7–14 June, XXX Corps attacked to manoeuvre behind the Panzer-Lehr Division. The 7th Armoured Division pushed through a gap in the German front line caused by the success of the US 1st Infantry Division and occupied Villers-Bocage on the road to Caen from the west. The vanguard of the 7th Armoured Division was eventually withdrawn from the town but by 17 June the Panzer-Lehr Division had been forced back and XXX Corps had taken Tilly-sur-Seulles. Another operation was intended until 19 June but a severe storm descended upon the English Channel, lasted for three days and delayed the Allied build-up. Most of the convoys of landing craft and ships already at sea were driven back to ports in Britain; towed barges and other loads, including 2.5 mi (4.0 km) of floating roadways for the Mulberry harbours were lost and 800 craft were stranded on the Normandy beaches until July.

In Operation Epsom (First Battle of the Odon, 26–30 June), VIII Corps was to advance southwards on the left flank of XXX Corps, west of Caen, across the River Odon and the Orne, to capture the high ground near Bretteville-sur-Laize, to the south of Caen. The attack was preceded by Operation Martlet (also known as Operation Dauntless) by XXX Corps, to secure the western flank of VIII Corps by capturing the high ground of the Rauray Spur. The German defenders managed to contain the offensive in the vicinity of Hill 112 by committing all of their armoured units, including the two panzer divisions of the II SS Panzer Corps, newly arrived in Normandy and intended for a counter-offensive against British and American positions around Bayeux.

Operation Jupiter (10–11 July) was another attack by VIII Corps, to capture Baron-sur-Odon, Fontaine-Étoupefour, Château de Fontaine and take the rest of Hill 112. Following the capture of these objectives, VIII Corps would take Éterville, Maltot and the ground up to the River Orne. Tanks from the 4th Armoured Brigade supported by infantry, would then advance through the captured ground and secure several villages to the west of the River Orne. It was hoped that all first phase objectives could be captured by 9:00 a.m. on the first day and then elements of the 4th Armoured Brigade could start the second phase. The opening phase was successful but the battle for Hill 112 went on all day and the village of Maltot changed hands several times.

On 14 July, General Bernard Montgomery sent his Military Assistant to London to brief the Director of Military Operations that

The real object is to muck up and write off enemy troops. On the eastern flank he [Montgomery] is aiming to do the greatest damage to enemy armour. All the activities on the eastern flank are designed to help the [American] forces in the west while ensuring that a firm bastion is kept in the east. At the same time all is ready to take advantage of any situation which gives reason to think that the enemy is disintegrating.

the First US Army had attacked down the west coast of the Cotentin Peninsula but made little progress there or further inland in early July. The discovery that infantry reinforcements and the Panzer-Lehr Division had reached the American front, made it important that British operations at the east end of the front be continued, to prevent more transfers before the First US Army resumed its offensive on 19 July.

== Prelude ==
=== British offensive preparations ===
As preparations were made for Operation Goodwood on 17 July (postponed to 18 July), particularly a regrouping from 12 to 13 July, the Second Army planned two preliminary operations, to prevent Panzergruppe West from using four infantry divisions, which had recently arrived in Normandy, to relieve panzer divisions defending against the Second Army and re-create an armoured reserve. The three British armoured divisions and seven tank and armoured brigades, faced six panzer divisions and three heavy tank battalions. The British units were at full strength but the German units had suffered considerable attrition and few losses had been replaced. The German defences had been prepared in depth, exploiting the terrain, minefields, a large number of long-range anti-tank guns and three Nebelwerfer brigades. In the Second Army opposite Panzergruppe West, VIII Corps was in reserve with the Guards, 7th and 11th Armoured divisions. On the right flank from Caumont to Rauray, XXX Corps had the 49th, 50th and 59th Infantry divisions, supported by the 8th and 33rd Armoured brigades, which faced the XLVII Panzer Corps with the 276th Infantry Division and the 2nd Panzer Division, awaiting the arrival of the 326th Infantry Division from the 15th Army to allow the 2nd Panzer Division to withdraw into reserve.

In the Odon salient XII Corps, comprising the 15th, 43rd and 53rd Infantry divisions, supported by the 4th Armoured, 31st and 34th Tank brigades, were opposed by the II SS Panzer Corps comprising the 271st and 277th Infantry divisions, the SS Division Frundsberg and 102nd SS Heavy Panzer Battalion, with the SS Division Hohenstaufen in reserve. In the Caen sector II Canadian Corps with the 2nd and 3rd Canadian Infantry divisions, with the 2nd Canadian Armoured Brigade were opposite the I SS Panzer Corps with the 272nd Infantry Division, SS Division Leibstandarte, the 101st SS Heavy Panzer Battalion and the SS Division Hitlerjugend in reserve. To the east of Caen, I Corps was opposed by LXXXVI Corps. Behind the German defences, the III Flak Corps, the 7th, 8th and most of the 9th werfer Brigades and the 654 Panzerjäger Battalion 654 were in reserve.

XII and XXX Corps planned holding operations on the left flank in the Odon valley, from Tilly-sur-Seulles in the west to Caen in the east, to improve their positions and to deceive the Germans, that the expected British offensive would be launched west of the Orne, while Operation Goodwood was being prepared east of the river. On 15 July, XII Corps was to attack from the Odon salient to establish a secure jumping-off line, along the road running south-east from Bougy through Évrecy, for a later advance south-west towards Aunay or south-east to Thury-Harcourt. Next day, XXX Corps was to commence operations to take ground around Noyers, ready to reach the high ground to the north-east of Villers-Bocage.

=== Plan ===
XII Corps, comprising the 15th (Scottish) Infantry Division, reinforced by a brigade of 53rd (Welsh) Infantry Division and the 34th Tank Brigade, the 43rd (Wessex) Infantry Division and the other two brigades of the 53rd (Welsh) Infantry Division, was to attack in Operation Greenline at 9:30 p.m. on 15 July, using Monty's Moonlight, searchlight beams reflected from clouds to illuminate the ground. The two 53rd Division brigades were to secure a start line for the 43rd Division to attack towards Hill 112 and drive a corridor to the Orne River via Bougy, Évrecy and Maizet, ready to advance on Aunay-sur-Odon or Thury Harcourt should there be a German withdrawal. Further west, XXX Corps was to conduct Operation Pomegranate beginning on 16 July, in which the 49th (West Riding) Infantry Division on the right, was to capture Vendes and the surrounding area, in the centre the 59th (Staffordshire) Infantry Division was to capture the villages of Noyers-Bocage, Haut des Forges and Landelle, and on the left the 53 (Welsh) Division was to attack, ready for the corps to advance towards the high ground north-east of Villers Bocage.

=== German defensive preparations ===
On 29 June, during the British Epsom offensive, Field Marshal Gerd von Rundstedt, Commander-in-Chief West and Field Marshal Erwin Rommel, the commander of Army Group B, had met with Hitler at Berchtesgaden and been told to maintain the defence of Normandy. The German commanders were also ordered to organise a counter-offensive against the British salient. On their return from Germany, they received reports from SS-Obergruppenführer Paul Hausser, the commander of the 7th Army, and Panzergruppe West commander Leo Geyr von Schweppenburg urging a retirement from Caen to a new line beyond the range of Allied naval guns. The proposals were forwarded to Hitler and on 2 July Rundstedt was sacked and replaced by Field Marshal Günther von Kluge. Geyr was dismissed and replaced by General Heinrich Eberbach two days later.

On 8 July Hitler issued a new directive requiring the front in Normandy to be maintained, since the German forces lacked the tactical mobility for a battle of manoeuvre and an invasion in the Pas de Calais was believed imminent. Kluge made a tour of inspection and ordered that the existing positions be maintained, that they be increased in depth by the use of every available man for labour, and that a new counter-offensive by the seven panzer divisions, be prepared against the Odon salient for 1 August, by which date the infantry divisions arriving in Normandy must have completed relieving the panzer divisions. The offensive was to be conducted on a 3 mi (4.8 km) front from Grainville-sur-Odon to Juvigny-sur-Seulles, to reach Luc-sur-Mer behind Caen. (Rommel thought the plan unrealistic and on 16 July wrote to Hitler predicting that the Normandy front would soon collapse. Next day, he was strafed by Allied aircraft and wounded, which ended his service in Normandy.)

== Battle ==
=== Operation Greenline, 15–17 July ===
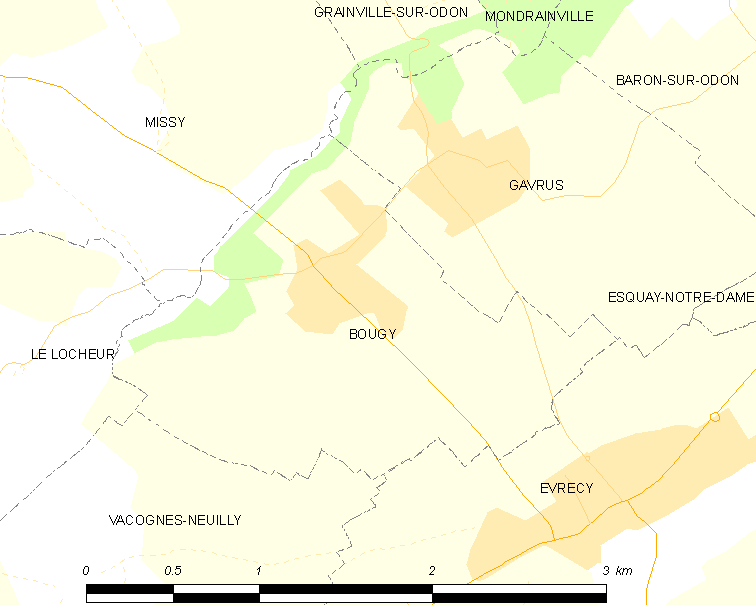
Map of the XII Corps area

On the left flank of the 15th (Scottish) Division, the crossroads at le Bon Repos and the higher ground overlooking Esquay-Notre-Dame were attacked by the 2nd Glasgow Highlanders of the 227th (Highland) Infantry Brigade (227th Brigade), supported by Churchill tanks of the 107th Regiment Royal Armoured Corps (107th RAC) of the 34th Tank Brigade and the 141st Regiment Royal Armoured Corps (141st RAC) of the 79th Armoured Division, equipped with Churchill Armoured Vehicle Royal Engineers (AVRE) and Churchill Crocodile flamethrower tanks. The Scottish advanced from the north-east, south-west over the northern slope of Hill 112 towards the defences of the III Battalion, 21st SS Panzergrenadier Regiment. As the infantry emerged from dead ground, they were met by massed mortar fire, which temporarily disorganised the battalion, as did a smokescreen placed on Hill 112, which had merged with fog and covered the area.

The Scottish managed to cross the start line on time at 9:30 p.m. and captured the SS survivors of a flamethrower attack by the Crocodiles on the road running from Croix des Filandriers to le Bon Repos. The advance continued downhill, under Monty's Moonlight, covered by fire from the 107th RAC Churchills on higher ground just south of Baron. Esquay was captured by 11:00 p.m. but not held, as its position below a saucer of higher ground made it a shell-trap. The two leading tank squadrons and two troops of Crocodiles from the 141st RAC were engaged, while the third squadron waited in reserve behind the crest, under frequent mortar fire during the evening and night. Four tanks were lost, but many of the crews returned after dark. The troops dug in on the surrounding rises at positions determined earlier using reconnaissance photographs. The attack was interpreted by the Germans as a move on Hill 112 and Tiger I tanks of 102nd SS Heavy Panzer Battalion were sent up the southern slope to repulse an attack that never came.

Further west, the rest of the division had captured Point 113 but not Évrecy, which left the Glasgow Highlanders overlooked from both flanks, although German counter-attacks by infantry of the 21st SS Panzergrenadier Regiment and tanks of the 10th SS Panzer Regiment at first concentrated on Esquay, which had already been evacuated. The Germans counter-attack then fell on the positions around le Bon Repos, where two Panzer IVs were knocked out by 6-pounder anti-tank guns. The Scots were pushed back several times, only for bombardment by the medium artillery of XII Corps to drive the Germans back. On 18 July, the 107th RAC had a skirmish with dug‑in Tigers and two 88 mm self-propelled guns and lost four tanks on the ridge. The Highlanders maintained their positions for two days, before being relieved by a battalion of the 53rd (Welsh) Division.

The 44th (Lowland) Brigade was to attack south-west from Tourmauville to take Point 113, Gavrus and Bougy in the Odon valley, while the 227th Brigade was to capture Esquay and then attack Évrecy. The main 44th Brigade attack would then begin, with an attack by the 6th King's Own Scottish Borderers (KOSB) on Point 113 and then an attack by the 2nd Gordon Highlanders and the 10th Highland Light Infantry of the 227th Brigade on the left flank at 10:30 p.m., followed by an attack by the 8th Royal Scots with the 153rd Regiment Royal Armoured Corps (153rd RAC) of the 34th Tank Brigade on the flank of the hill at 5:30 a.m. on 16 July to take Gavrus and Bougy; Monty's Moonlight was to be deployed to assist the night advance. The 6th KOSB formed up on a start line behind the German outpost line and advanced directly into the German defences under the artificial moonlight. By morning the Scottish were dug in on the hill, one company finding itself 1,000 yd (910 m) forward of its objective, which disrupted German preparations for a counter-attack, before retiring to its objective.

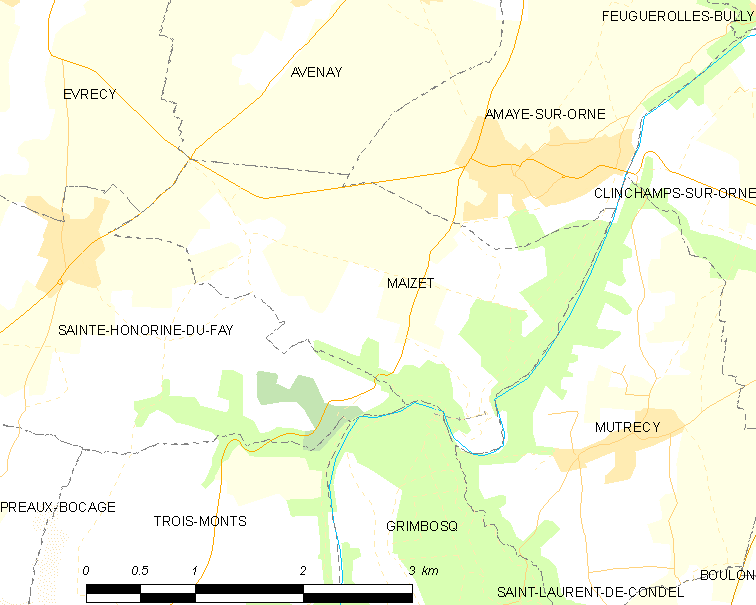
Maizet area

At 5:30 a.m. on 16 July, the 8th Royal Scots (8th RS) and the 153rd RAC advanced towards Gavrus, the tanks attacking to the side of the hill on the left flank, protected from the Germans in Évrecy by the ridge, to get behind the village and menace the German line of retreat, while the infantry overran the village. By 7:45 a.m. the 8th RS had taken the village and 70 prisoners. A similar attack was made on Bougy and another 100 prisoners were taken after the garrison was routed. During the day, several counter-attacks were made on the Scottish positions, which were repulsed by artillery barrages, with many German casualties. In the afternoon, the Germans counter‑attacked twice with Tiger and Panther tanks accompanied by infantry. Mortar fire on forward positions was continuous throughout the afternoon and evening, but no ground was lost and many casualties were inflicted on the Germans in a mutually costly action. The tank crews fought or were at instant readiness for thirty hours without relief, from zero hour until the German counter-attacks ended.

The 6th Royal Scots Fusiliers (6th RSF) were moved forward to Gavrus and the 8th RS formed up at Bougy. On the left flank, the situation deteriorated after the 227th Brigade attack on Évrecy failed; contact with the 6th KOSB became tenuous. By dawn on 16 July, the 15th (Scottish) Division had captured Bougy, Gavrus, and dug in around Esquay and the western end of Point 113. On 17 July, the front line became quieter, but the 44th Brigade was exposed by the success of the German defenders on the flanks and subjected to artillery bombardment. The 6th KOSB repulsed two attacks, and the Germans defeated British attacks towards Évrecy. Two officers of the 8th RSF had led patrols towards Évrecy and found that German positions were still occupied. By the morning of 18 July, the German positions were found to have been partly evacuated and the 6th KOSB pushed forward to the Bougy–Évrecy road. An attack by the 59th (Staffordshire) Division of XXX Corps, from the right (western) flank towards the positions of the 8th RS, made very slow progress. Four more German counter-attacks against the 44th Brigade were defeated. During the night, the brigade was relieved by the 71st Brigade, 53rd (Welsh) Division and returned to Le Haut du Bosq, suffering several casualties on the way. The 9th SS Panzer Division was brought up from reserve and by the end of the day had restored the front line, except at Hill 113.

The 158th Brigade of the 53rd (Welsh) Division, under command of the 15th Division and the 147th RAC were due to attack early on 16 July. The attack was postponed because minefields around Baron had not been cleared; several flail tanks and two Churchill tanks had been disabled by mine explosions. On the next night, the attack was cancelled due to fog and the operation began late on 17 July. To attack Évrecy required a long advance down a forward slope to the village. The attack was poorly prepared and the infantry battalion had already been depleted by casualties, a composite company being formed from one officer and fifty men and a second company consisting of only a composite platoon. The infantry were too tired to keep up with the tanks, which had to move quickly when brought under 88mm fire from the village. About 150 prisoners were taken, but mortar fire forced the infantry back to their start line. The 53rd (Welsh) Division captured Cahier and defeated several big counter-attacks. More attacks by XII Corps gained no ground and during the evening of 17 July, the British force on Point 113 withdrew, ending the operation.

=== Operation Pomegranate, 16–17 July ===
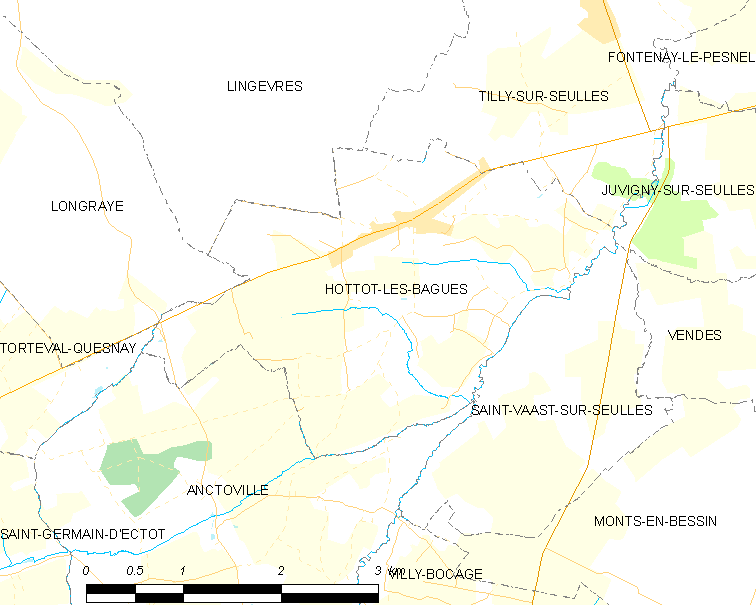
Hottot-les-Bagues (Map commune FR insee code 14336)

On 16 July, XXX Corps launched Operation Pomegranate. On the right of the corps, the 50th (Northumbrian) Division had held ground north of Hottot since the last week of June and kept the front line disturbed by frequent patrols and raids, which provoked several German counter-attacks supported by tanks. The 56th Independent Brigade had attacked Hottot on 8 July had captured its objective on the main road west of Hottot and then been driven back by a Panzer-Lehr Division counter-attack, by three infantry companies and c. 30 tanks, which pushed the brigade back across the road. On 11 July, the 231st Brigade attacked Hottot to capture the village. Supported by tanks and an elaborate artillery fire plan, two battalions were able to reach the northern fringe of the village.

During the attack on 18 July the 50th Division captured Hottot for the last time, assisted by a German retirement caused by Operation Goodwood and Operation Cobra. The occupation of Hottot left the 50th Division poised to capture Villers Bocage and advance towards the River Noireau. On the right flank of the 50th Division, the 56th Independent Infantry Brigade faced the 2nd Panzer Division, which maintained constant attacks by mortars, self-propelled guns and snipers. The brigade patrolled extensively and by 20 July, it was realised that the enemy had withdrawn from the La Chapelle area. A patrol went forward and dug in and then a company advanced through Bois de Saint Germain and dug in on the southern fringe. (Note: The La Chapelle position had been a very good observation post, allowing the Germans to look deep into allied lines; more than 450 Teller mines and 160 anti-personnel mines were lifted on the road up to the position.)

In the centre of XXX Corps, the 49th (West Riding) Division attacked with the 146th Brigade at la Barbée Farm with the 1/4th Battalion, King's Own Yorkshire Light Infantry (KOYLI), which advanced at 6:45 a.m. and reached the farm quickly from the east. At 5:00 p.m. the Germans counter-attacked the farm and surrounded it on three sides. The Hallamshire Battalion, York and Lancs attacked Vendes frontally, despite representations that an attack by night or from the east would be less costly. The attack began at 6:45 a.m. and was stopped quickly by machine-gun crossfire. An attempt at a flank attack was stopped at la Bijude Farm and an attack from the west through la Barbée Farm after it had been captured also failed. A box-barrage around the Hallamshires and KOYLI was fired for twenty minutes after which the battalions withdrew at 5:00 p.m. Next day it was discovered from deserters that the Germans had withdrawn from Vendes and the farms.

In the 59th (Staffordshire) Division area, phase I of the attack began at 5:30 a.m. with the 197th Brigade on the right attacking with the 5th East Lancashires and 177th Brigade on the left with 5th and 1/6th South Staffords. The 5th East Lancashires fought their way to the first objective east of Vendes and captured part of the village by 8:00 a.m. but at 2:30 p.m. were counter-attacked by infantry and tanks, which overran one company and forced the rest of the battalion back to the start line. The 1/6th South Staffords captured Brettevillette in a costly attack by 6:45 a.m. in which many troops lost direction in the thick dawn mist and the British found that the area had been sown thickly with mines. The battalion pressed on and reached Queudeville by 8:45 a.m., despite most of the tanks in support of the battalion having already been knocked out in a British minefield.

The 5th South Staffords took orchards west of Grainville sur Odon and captured Les Nouillons by noon, which left the 177th Brigade on the first phase objectives. At 1:30 p.m. flail tanks began to work through a German minefield at Queudeville. Phase II was delayed by the casualties incurred in Phase I but at 5:30 p.m. the 2/6th South Staffords attacked Noyers and at 6:15 p.m. the 6th North Staffords attacked Haut des Forges. The 2/6th South Staffords captured part of Noyers but were forced back to Point 126, north of the railway station. The 6th North Staffords took Haut des Forges against less determined opposition. The 59th Division had captured 369 prisoners. On the 197th Infantry Brigade front, the 2/5th Lancashire Fusiliers attacked the phase I objective at 10:30 p.m. but massed German mortar fire, prevented the battalion from leaving the start line.

At dawn on 17 July, the 2/6th South Staffords and part of the 5th South Staffords attacked Noyers and advanced close to the railway station, before being forced under cover and at 1:30 p.m. were withdrawn to reorganise. During the afternoon the 5th South Staffordshires attacked Noyers from the north-east but were held up on the fringe. The 1/6th South Staffords advanced from Brettevillette towards Bordel at the same time against determined resistance. When night fell the British fell back slightly from Noyers during another bombardment. In the 197th Brigade area, the 1/7th Royal Warwicks, tanks of the 1st Northamptonshire Yeomanry and Churchill Crocodiles attacked the phase I objective again at 12:30 p.m. and captured the objective; the 176th Brigade attacked Bordel but made little progress.

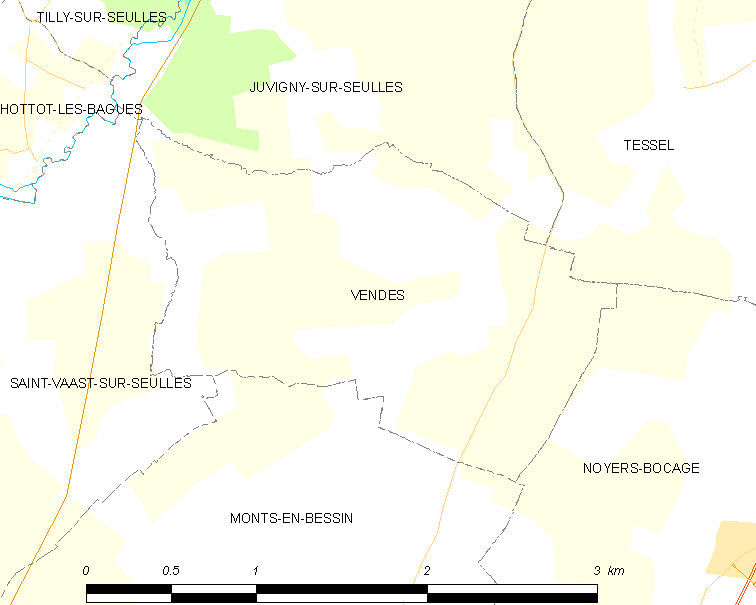
Vendes area (Map commune FR insee code 14734)

Next day, the 177th Brigade attacked Noyers at 10:00 a.m. with the 1/6th and 5th South Staffords supported by conventional tanks, Churchill AVRE and Crocodile flame thrower tanks, which were not able to advance far against determined German resistance. Five more tanks were lost and another attack in the afternoon failed. The British retired after dark to enable another bombardment of the village. On the right flank, the 1/7th Royal Warwicks reached Ferme de Guiberon by nightfall and the 49th Division reported that there had been withdrawals on their front. In the centre the 7th South Staffords of the 176th Brigade advanced on Bordel and took the village and the area to la Senevière against few German troops but much artillery and mortar fire.

The 197th Brigade was relieved overnight by the 176th Brigade and the 7th Royal Norfolks took over from the 1/7th Royal Warwicks at the Ferme de Guiberon, Point 124 and Landet, which had been taken after dark. The British infantry had captured the high ground south of Brettevillette and took 300 prisoners on the first day. Next day the advance continued with much fighting on the outskirts of Noyers-Bocage. The reconnaissance battalion of the 9th SS Panzer Division was committed to the defence of Noyers-Bocage, which the Germans claimed to have recaptured, although XXX Corps had been held up on the outskirts having captured the high ground outside the village and the railway station. The 49th Division captured Vendes. The 59th Division took Haut des Forges and entered Noyers but was repulsed from the village by the 277th Division. The 50th Division captured Hottot-les-Bagues, which had been fought over for more than a month and took 300 prisoners.

== Aftermath ==
=== Analysis ===
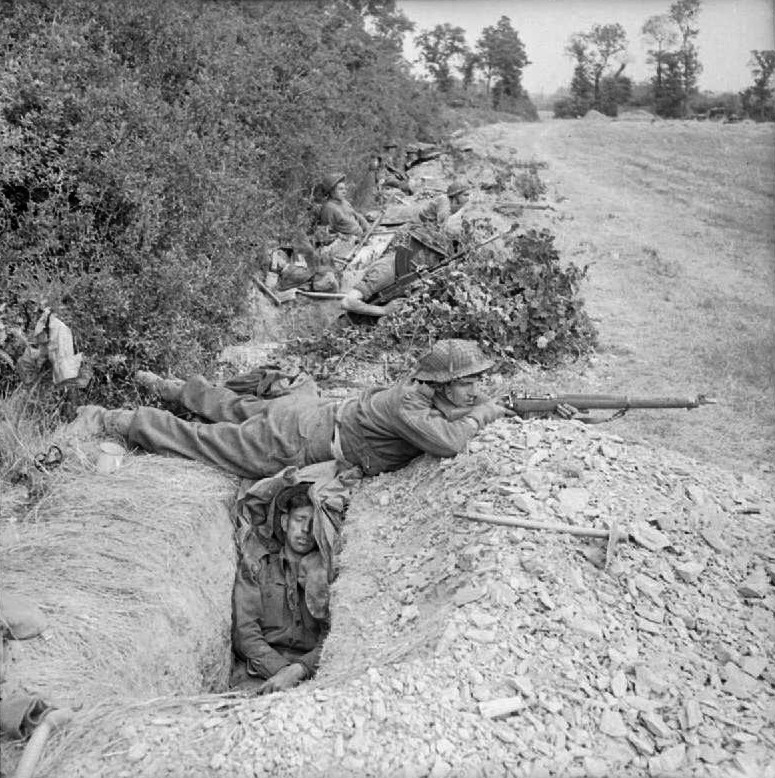
British Infantry in slit trenches between Hill 112 and Hill 113, 16 July 1944

These two operations cost the British Second Army 3,500 casualties and no significant gains had been made but the operations were strategically successful in that the 2nd Panzer Division and the 1st and 10th SS Panzer divisions had been kept in the front line and the 9th SS Panzer Division had been recalled from reserve. The Germans had been forced to react to each threat that developed in the Odon Valley. Around 2,000 German casualties had been suffered in the two operations and on 16 July the 9th SS Panzer Division recorded the loss of 23 tanks. Copp called these operations the Second Battle of the Odon and wrote that it was "one of the bloodiest encounters of the campaign". In the 15th Division attack, the 44th Brigade had captured all its objectives and maintained them, despite ten German counter-attacks, which were costly defeats. The tactics of the 181st Field Regiment RA in support of the brigade, had become as routine as the German practice of frequent small counter-attacks, in which the German infantry had wasted away under British fire power.

Zetterling recorded the operational state of the 10th SS Panzer Division on 14 July as 16 Panzer IV tanks and 12 StuG III assault guns and that next day another Panzer IV and a StuG III returned to service. On 16 July, nine Panzer IV and an unknown number of StuG III remained operational. On 17 July, ten Panzer IV and nine StuG III were operational; on 18 July, two more Panzer IV returned from repair and the number of operational StuG III fell to six. The 9th SS Panzer Division had 19 Panzer IV, 38 Panther and 16 StuG III operational on 14 July, which on 17 July changed to 13, 25 and 15 and on 18 July, had recovered to 20, 25 and 15. Tiger availability in the 102nd SS Heavy Panzer Battalion was 19 on 14 July, on 15 July was 19 and on 20 July had fallen to 17 operational Tigers. Records for the 2nd Panzer Division are sparser and show that on 1 July it had 85 Panzer IV, 21 Panther and 12 Jagpanzer IV operational. On 11 August the operational state had declined to nine Panzer IV, eight Panthers and five Jagdpanzer IV; some losses may be assumed to have occurred during Operation Pomegranate.

=== Casualties ===
Copp wrote that British casualties in the operations were c. 3,000 men and the German defenders suffered c. 2,000 casualties. The 107th RAC suffered casualties of 46 men. In the 147th RAC, A Squadron returned from a deep penetration of the German defences with the loss of six tanks. B Squadron lost four tanks and C Squadron one tank. From 15 to 18 July, the 147th RAC had 47 casualties. When the 153rd RAC was withdrawn, 96 tank crew had become casualties, twelve tanks had been knocked out and several damaged, leaving 29 tanks operational. In three days the 34th Tank Brigade had lost 30 Officers and 156 men, with 97 tanks still operational, although many damaged tanks had not yet been repaired. Doherty wrote that the British suffered casualties of c. 3,500 men, 1,000 in in the 15th (Scottish) Division. The 59th Division suffered 1,250 casualties and took 575 prisoners from the 276th and 277th Infantry divisions, which had been supported by parts of the 2nd Panzer and 9th SS-Panzer divisions. Until 16 July the 276th Division suffered 1,000 casualties and by the end of the month has suffered 388 men killed, 1,851 men wounded and 461 men missing.. The 277th Division lost 1,000 men from 13 to 16 July and by the end of the month had suffered casualties of 312 men killed, 1,327 men wounded and 1,161 men missing.

== Subsequent operations ==
=== Operation Goodwood, 18–20 July ===
After the preliminary attacks, Operation Goodwood took place from 18–20 July. VIII Corps, with three armoured divisions, launched the attack aiming to seize the German-held Bourguébus Ridge, along with the area between Bretteville-sur-Laize and Vimont, while also destroying as many German tanks as possible. On 18 July, I Corps conducted an advance to secure a series of villages and the eastern flank of VIII Corps. On the VIII Corps western flank, the II Canadian Corps launched Operation Atlantic, to capture the remaining sections of the city of Caen south of the Orne River. When Operation Goodwood ended on 20 July, the armoured divisions had broken through the German forward defences and had advanced 7 mi (11 km) to the lower slopes of Bourguébus Ridge.

=== Operation Express, 22 July ===
After Operation Windsor from 4–5 July, the capture of the western outskirts of Caen during Operation Charnwood from 8–9 July and Operation Jupiter from 10–11 July, the village of Maltot had been taken over by the 272nd Infantry Division on 22 July from the 10th SS Panzer Division, which had moved into reserve around St. Martin, ready to counter-attack. The British planned to attack Maltot from the north-east with the Orne on the left flank. During Operation Jupiter, the attack had come over open ground, southwards from Château Fontaine and Éterville, easily seen from Hill 112. Operation Express was to begin from Louvigny. The 5th Wiltshire Battalion (5th Wilts) and B Squadron of the 7th Royal Tank Regiment (7th RTR) of the 31st Tank Brigade, were to capture the village and orchards north of the road from Louvigny and the 4th Wiltshire with A Squadron 7th RTR, were to attack the woods, orchards and a spur south-east of Maltot. The 4th Somerset Light Infantry were kept in reserve, ready to exploit any success. (Note: On the east bank of the Orne, the 5th Canadian Infantry Brigade raided Etavaux with two companies, which attacked along the railway close to the riverbank. The infantry advanced behind a creeping barrage and support was provided by a troop of tanks from the Sherbrooke Fusiliers on higher ground. Both companies advanced slowly against the fire of many machine-gun posts, which could not be seen by the Sherbrooke tanks. Several Canadian soldiers rushed German machine-gun nests and enabled the advance to continue to the village, where the Canadians fought with the German garrison until the British barrage was due and then retired. After Maltot was captured, the Canadians returned to occupy the village and took c. 100 prisoners from the 272nd Division, for a loss of 108 casualties during the operation.)

The attack began at 5:30 p.m. and on the right side of the road the 5th Wilts advanced behind a smoke screen and an artillery barrage. The German defenders were taken by surprise and at first were stunned by the bombardment. As the British moved through the village, some of the defenders recovered and hand-to-hand fighting took place. Grenadiers from the 10th SS Panzer Division and Tiger tanks from the 102nd SS Heavy Panzer Battalion began a counter-attack as Maltot was entered and knocked out several Churchill tanks of B Squadron. A British forward air controller saw the German tanks and called in Typhoon fighter-bombers, which forced the Tigers back to Hill 112, as the Grenadiers reinforced the German infantry in the village. On the other side of the Louvigny road, the 4th Wilts and A Squadron advanced through woods and farms, to the final objective south of the village. The infantry went first, two sections in front of each tank, with the Squadron commander on foot accompanying the infantry commanders.

When it was seen that the 4th Wilts on the other side of the road, had been delayed by the German defence of Lieu de France Farm at the east end of Maltot, Churchill and Churchill Crocodile tanks advanced, bombarded and flamed the defenders and then overran the position. As the advance moved into the woods, small parties of British and German infantry stalked each other through trees, small quarries and trenches. The German defenders were overrun in about two hours; mopping up began but some German troops held out as dark fell. Most of the surviving defenders retired to Château Maltot on the far side of the road, were by-passed and cut off. As the 4th Wilts moved forward to the Rau de Maltot stream, they were stopped by fire from the château. Bombardment by the Churchills had no effect, except to prompt a German medic to emerge and request a truce, which was offered provided that all German troops in the château surrender. This was refused and at dusk the British attacked again and broke into the ground floor but were not able to get upstairs against showers of hand grenades. Overnight the outbuildings were captured and the château was kept under fire by the tanks.

From 9:30 to 10:00 p.m., both battalions reached the final objectives to the west of Maltot and the woods to the south. The tanks withdrew behind the start line, having lost eight vehicles and just after dawn, the remaining Germans in the château gave up, having lost hope of being rescued by a dawn counter-attack. By the end of Operation Express, the fighting in Normandy had reduced the 10th SS Panzer Division from c. 15,000 men to 2,289 and only the most vital positions could be counter-attacked. By dawn, the British were met by the sight of the dead from Operation Jupiter and long-range fire from German tanks and guns on the south-east ridge of Hill 112, having taken more than 400 prisoners, in what the Wiltshires called a "text-book" operation. Commanders had studied maps, photographs and sand models, had been given time to establish infantry-tank co-operation with 7th RTR and conduct reconnaissance. The 43rd (Wessex) Division was withdrawn and the ground taken over by the 53rd (Welsh) Division. Hill 112 was occupied almost unopposed on 4 August, as the Germans struggled to repel Operation Cobra and Operation Bluecoat further west.

=== Upper Odon Valley, 18 July – 2 August ===
The Glasgow Highlanders on the left flank, were relieved by the 1/5th Battalion, Welch Regiment of the 53rd Division on 17 July. From 18 July, the 34th Tank Brigade operated in close support of the 53rd (Welsh) Division, which eventually extended its line from Bougy to the Orne at Maltot. The 153rd RAC returned to the line after eight days of recuperation. On 21 July, at 4:00 p.m. the battalion was attacked by the 10th SS Panzer Division at le Bon Repos and by 9:30 p.m. one company had been overrun. The Germans rolled up the Welsh front, the survivors retired into the C Company area and the battalion withdrew at 6:00 a.m. under a smoke screen, having lost 140 casualties. Several Churchills had also been lost, having been out-ranged and out-gunned by six Tiger tanks from Hill 112. Two days later, the 4th Welch Battalion with the 107th RAC in support, raided the captured positions, aided by Churchill Crocodiles and inflicted many casualties on the German defenders before retiring.

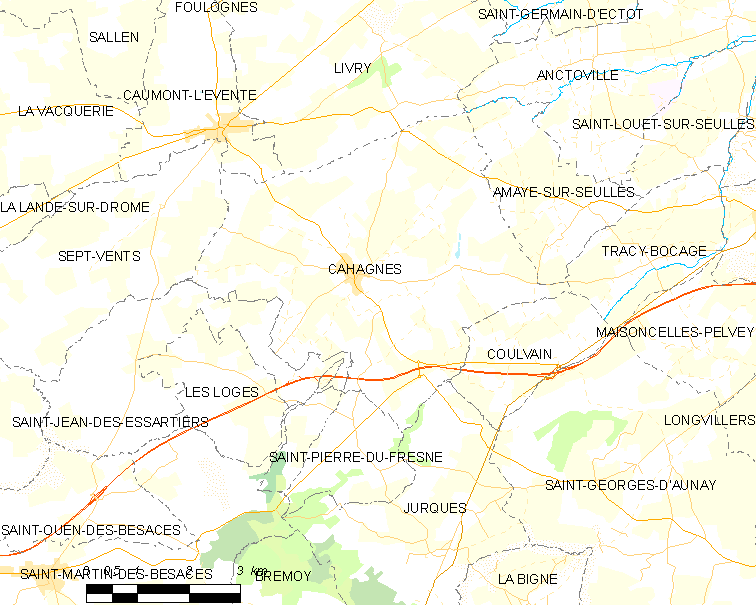
Map of XII Corps area of operations, July–August 1944 (commune FR insee code 14120)

The 107th RAC had no losses and recovered a tank lost in the previous attack. A smoke barrage enabled the raid to be made in daylight down the forward slope, which prevented many casualties. The 49th Division occupied Vendes on 19 July but patrols from the 177th Infantry Brigade, in the 59th Division area found Noyers still occupied. An attack was cancelled by the XII Corps commander at noon in favour of vigorous patrolling over the corps front. On 2 August, the 107th RAC raided Esquay again as the area beyond Bougy was raided by troops and the 147th RAC and the area near Maltot was raided by the 153rd RAC. Until 5 August, 247 crew casualties were suffered and 47 tanks were knocked out, about half being written off and the rest repaired.

In the 49th Division area the 146th Brigade advanced again on 19 July; the German infantry and two Tiger tanks which had reoccupied la Barbée Farm and la Bijude Farm had been forced out by artillery and mortar fire. Deserters confirmed that the garrisons had withdrawn and two battalions moved forward behind sappers, who lifted many mines on the road to Château Juvigny, which had been a German battalion headquarters; the bodies of three men missing since 9 July were found in the cellars. At the end of July, the 8th Armoured Brigade less the 13th/18th Hussars was moved to support the 43rd (Wessex) Division and the 13th/18th Hussars went in support of the 50th (Northumbrian) Division, whose objective was the dominating Butte du Mont à Vent ridge.

The 43rd (Wessex) Division attack began early on 30 July into the bocage, which was full of mines and booby traps. The Sherwood Rangers Yeomanry supported the 130th Infantry Brigade of the 43rd Division in an attack on Cahagnes and on the left flank the 13th/18th Hussars took Saint-Germain-d'Ectot and Orbois. The 12th King's Royal Rifle Corps (12th KRRC) advanced and dug in to protect the flank of the 43rd Division and the 50th Division with the 13th/18th Hussars captured Amayé-sur-Seulles. The Sherwood Rangers Yeomanry advanced in moonlight with the 7th Hampshires on their tanks to capture Jurques and during the day La Bigne and Loisonniers were captured after overcoming determined German resistance. The British advance then temporarily halted close to Mont Pinçon, which dominated the area from the Vire to the Odon.
