= Battle of the Odon =

Battle of the Odon may refer to two battles of the Second World War:

- Operation Epsom, also known as the First Battle of the Odon, June 1944
- Second Battle of the Odon, July 1944
