= Operation Epsom =

British military operation in France in 1944

- Part of the Battle for Caen
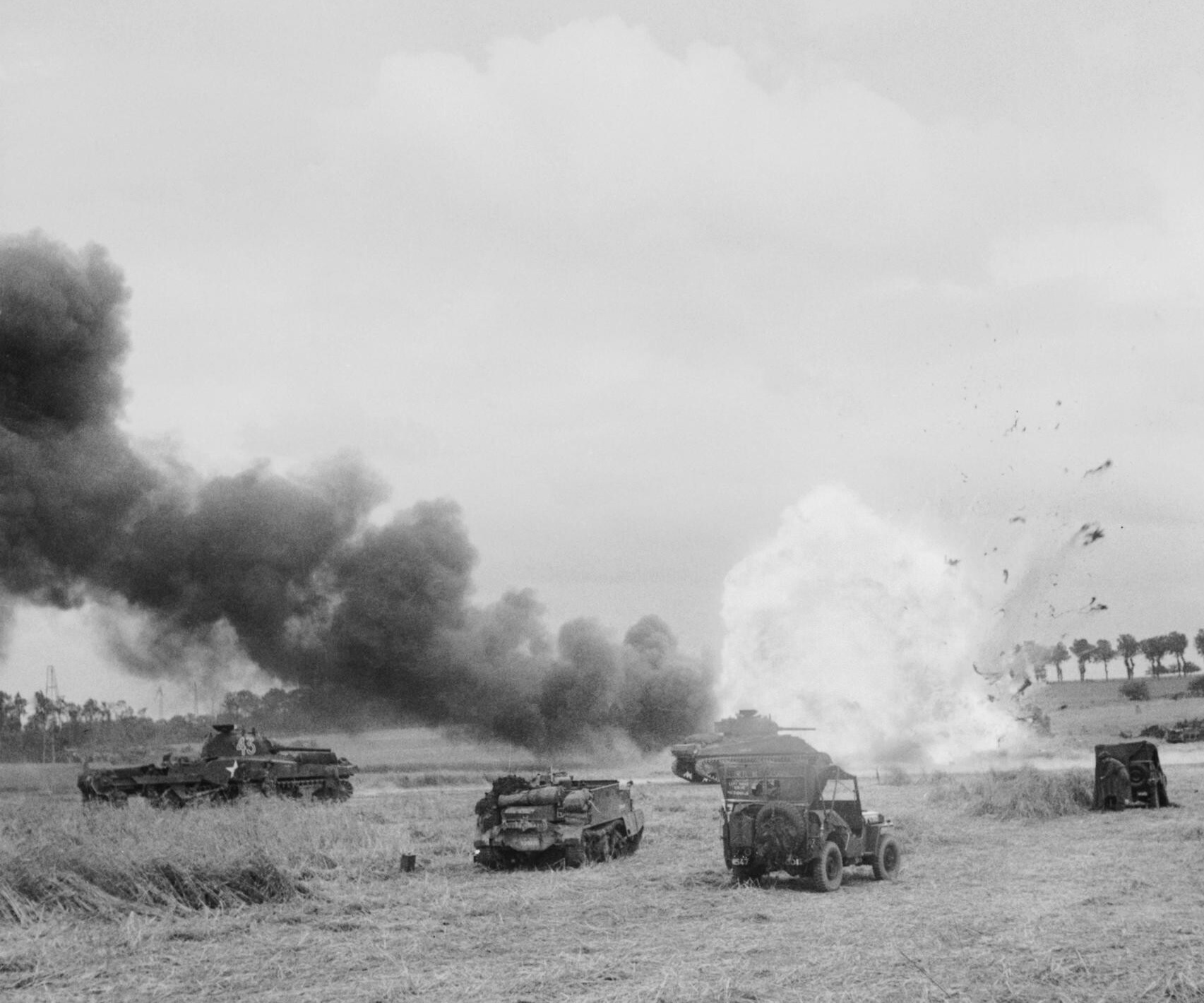
- An ammunition carrier of the British 11th Armoured Division explodes after it is hit by a mortar round during Operation Epsom, 26 June 1944.
Date	26–30 June 1944
Location	West of Caen, Normandy, France 49°17′00″N 00°18′00″W
Result	See Aftermath section

Belligerents
United Kingdom	Germany

Commanders and leaders
Bernard Montgomery; Miles Dempsey; Richard O'Connor; Pip Roberts; Ivor Thomas; Gordon MacMillan	Friedrich Dollmann; Leo Geyr von Schweppenburg; Sepp Dietrich; Paul Hausser; Wilhelm Bittrich

Units involved
2nd Army	Panzer Group West

Strength
60,000 men; 600 tanks; 2 infantry divisions; 7 infantry brigades; 1 armoured division; 1 armoured brigade; 1 tank brigade	8 panzer divisions; 700 tanks; 2 heavy tank battalions; 1 Sturmgeschütz battalion; 2 Nebelwerfer brigades; 1 anti-aircraft regiment

Casualties and losses
4,000 men, 2,331 in 15th (Scottish) Infantry Division; 150 tanks lost	3,000 men; 126 tanks lost (25 Tigers and 41 Panthers)
- Caen, a commune, prefecture of the Calvados department

Operation Epsom
- Operational scope: Strategic Offensive
- Planned by: Second Army
- Objective: Break out of the bridgehead west of Caen, advance across the Orne River and capture the high ground south of Caen, near Bretteville-sur-Laize
- Executed by: VIII Corps; supporting attacks by part of XXX Corps.
- Outcome: See Aftermath section

Operation Epsom, also known as the First Battle of the Odon, was a British offensive in the Second World War between 26 and 30 June 1944, during the Battle of Normandy. The offensive was intended to outflank and seize the German-occupied city of Caen from the west, an important Allied objective, in the early stages of Operation Overlord, the Allied invasion of north-west Europe.

Preceded by Operation Martlet to secure the right flank of the advance, Operation Epsom began early on 26 June, with units of the 15th (Scottish) Infantry Division advancing behind a creeping artillery barrage. Air cover was sporadic for much of the operation, because poor weather in England forced the cancellation of bomber support. Accompanied by the 31st Tank Brigade, the 15th (Scottish) Infantry Division made steady progress and by the end of the first day had overrun much of the German outpost line, although some difficulties remained in securing the flanks. In mutually-costly fighting over the following two days, a foothold was secured across the River Odon and efforts were made to expand this, by capturing tactically valuable points around the salient and moving up the 43rd (Wessex) Infantry Division. By 30 June, after German counter-attacks, some of the British forces across the river were withdrawn and the captured ground consolidated, bringing the operation to a close.

Many casualties were suffered by both sides but unlike General Bernard Montgomery, the Allied commander in Normandy, Generalfeldmarschall Erwin Rommel was unable to withdraw units into reserve after the battle, as they were needed to hold the front line. The British retained the initiative, attacked several more times over the following two weeks and captured Caen in Operation Charnwood in mid-July. Interpretations of the intention and conduct of Operation Epsom differ but there is general agreement concerning its effect on the balance of forces in Normandy. The Germans contained the offensive but only by committing all their strength, including two panzer divisions just arrived in Normandy, which had been intended for an offensive against Allied positions around Bayeux.

== Background ==
Operation Overlord called for the British Second Army (Lieutenant-General Miles Dempsey), to secure the Caen and then form a front line from Caumont-l'Éventé to the south-east of Caen. The intention was to acquire space for airfields and to protect the left flank of the US First Army (Lieutenant General Omar N. Bradley), while it fought the Battle of Cherbourg. A section of the full British Army Order No 1 transcript (I Corps Operations Order No. 1, WO 171/258) read,

Should the enemy forestall us at CAEN and the defences prove to be strongly organised thus causing us to fail to capture it on D-Day, further direct frontal assaults which may prove costly will not be undertaken without reference to I Corps. In such an event 3 British Division will contain the enemy in CAEN and retain the bulk of its forces disposed for mobile operations inside the covering position. CAEN will be subjected to heavy air bombardment to limit its usefulness and to make its retention a costly business.

Possession of Caen and its surroundings would give the Second Army a suitable staging area for a push south to capture Falaise, which could be used as the pivot for a swing left to advance on Argentan and then towards the Touques River. Hampered by congestion in the beachhead, which delayed the deployment of its armoured support and forced to divert effort to attack strongly held German positions along the 9.3 mi (15.0 km) route to the town, the 3rd Infantry Division was unable to assault Caen in force on D-Day and was stopped short by the 21st Panzer Division. Follow-up attacks failed as German reinforcements arrived. Abandoning the direct approach, Operation Perch—a pincer attack by I and XXX Corps—was launched on 7 June, to encircle Caen from the east and west.

I Corps, striking south out of the Orne bridgehead, was halted by the 21st Panzer Division and the attack by XXX Corps west of Caen was stopped in front of Tilly-sur-Seulles by the Panzer-Lehr-Division. To force Panzer-Lehr to withdraw or surrender and to keep operations fluid, part of the 7th Armoured Division pushed through a gap in the German front line near Caumont and captured Villers-Bocage. The Battle of Villers-Bocage led to the vanguard of the 7th Armoured Division being ambushed and withdrawing from the town but by 17 June, Panzer Lehr had also been forced back and XXX Corps had taken Tilly-sur-Seulles.

Another attack by the 7th Armoured Division and other offensive operations were abandoned when a severe storm descended on the English Channel on 19 June. The storm lasted for three days and further delayed the Allied build-up. Most of the convoys of landing craft and ships already at sea were driven back to ports in Britain; towed barges and other loads (including 2.5 mi (4.0 km) of floating roadways for the Mulberry harbours) were lost and 800 craft were left stranded on Normandy beaches until the spring tides in July.

Planning began for a second offensive, Operation Dreadnought, from the Orne bridgehead by the British VIII Corps (Lieutenant-General Richard O'Connor), outflanking Caen from the east. Dreadnought was cancelled following objections from O'Connor after studying the ground and an attack towards Évrecy was considered and rejected, either by Montgomery or Dempsey. In a postwar interview with Chester Wilmot, Dempsey claimed that he told Montgomery that he was going to cancel the proposed operation on 18 June. The weather from 19 to 22 June grounded Allied aircraft and the Germans took advantage of the respite from air attacks to improve their defences. Infantry positions were protected with minefields and c. 70 88 mm guns were dug into hedgerows and woods covering the approaches to Caen.

== Plan ==
On 20 June, Field Marshal Erwin Rommel, the commander of Heeresgruppe B (Army Group B), was ordered by Hitler to launch a counter-offensive against the Allies between the towns of Caumont-l'Éventé (Caumont) and Saint-Lô. The objective was to cut a corridor between the American and British armies, by recapturing the city of Bayeux (taken by the British on 7 June) and the coast beyond. Four SS panzer divisions and one Heer panzer division were assigned to the task. Their assault was to be spearheaded by the II SS Panzer Corps, comprising the 9th SS Panzer Division Hohenstaufen and 10th SS Panzer Division Frundsberg, recently arrived from the Eastern Front. The 1st SS Panzer Division Leibstandarte SS Adolf Hitler, 2nd SS Panzer Division Das Reich and 2nd Panzer Division would support the attack. Most of the tanks used by these formations were Panzer IVs and Panthers, supplemented by sturmgeschütz (assault guns) and Tigers—the Panthers and Tigers being among the most lethal and well-protected German armoured vehicles of the war.

On 18 June, Montgomery issued a directive to Dempsey to launch a new pincer attack with the aim of capturing Caen. The initial plan called for I and XXX Corps to attack west of Caen for four days, before VIII Corps launched the main attack out of the Orne bridgehead, east of Caen, on 22 June. It was soon realised that VIII Corps would not be able to assemble within the small perimeter of the Orne bridgehead and the following day the plan was revised. A preliminary operation was to take place three days before the main assault. The 51st (Highland) Infantry Division (I Corps) was ordered to strike south from the Orne bridgehead, to prevent units of the 21st Panzer Division from being transferred. Operation Martlet was to commence one day before Epsom with the 49th (West Riding) Infantry Division and the 8th Armoured Brigade (XXX Corps) securing the right flank of VIII Corps, by capturing the high ground to the south-west.

The main role in Operation Epsom was assigned to the newly arrived VIII Corps, consisting of 60,244 men. VIII Corps would launch their offensive from the beachhead gained by the 3rd Canadian Infantry Division. Their operation was to take place in four phases, with its ultimate objective being the high ground near Bretteville-sur-Laize, south of Caen. VIII Corps would be supported by fire from 736 guns, (Note: 552 field guns, 112 medium guns, 48 heavy guns, and 24 heavy AA guns. I Corps: 216 field guns, 32 medium guns, and 16 heavy guns. VIII Corps: 240 field guns, 16 medium guns, 16 heavy guns, and 24 heavy AA guns. XXX Corps: 96 field guns, 64 medium guns, and 16 heavy guns.) three cruisers and the monitor HMS Roberts. The Royal Air Force was to provide a preliminary bombardment by 250 bombers and close air support thereafter.

The 15th (Scottish) Infantry Division would lead the assault. During Phase I, codenamed Gout, they were to take the villages of Sainte Manvieu and Cheux. In Phase II (Hangover), the division would advance to capture several crossings over the Odon River and the villages of Mouen and Grainville-sur-Odon. Should resistance during the opening phase prove light, the 11th Armoured Division would seize the bridges over the Odon River by coup de main. During the first two phases, the 43rd (Wessex) Infantry Division—to be reinforced on 28 June with the infantry brigade of the Guards Armoured Division—was to remain on the start line to provide a "firm base".

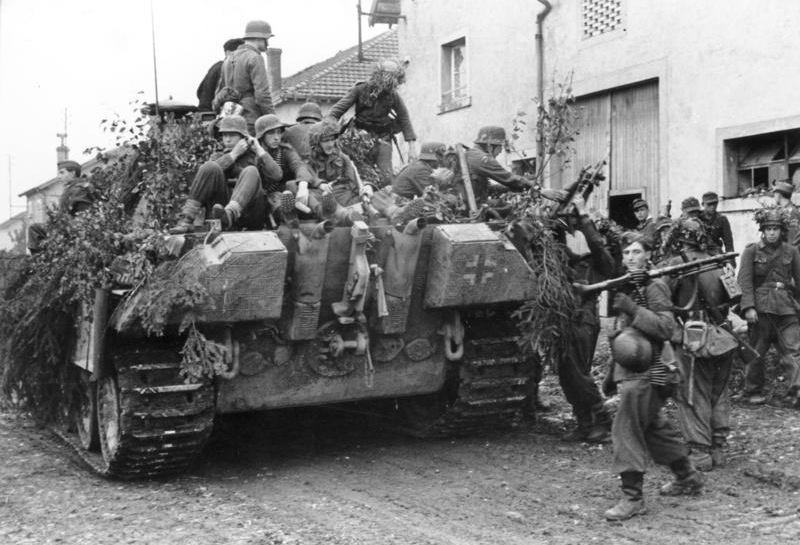
Panzergrenadiers dismount from a Panther.

In the third phase, Impetigo, the 43rd Division would move forward to relieve all Scottish infantry north of the Odon. The 15th Division would then assemble across the river and expand the bridgehead by capturing several important villages. In the final phase, codenamed Goitre, elements of the 43rd Division would cross the river to hold the area taken, while the 15th Division would continue to expand their bridgehead. The 11th Armoured Division would attempt to force a crossing over the River Orne and advance on their final objective of Bretteville-sur-Laize. The 4th Armoured Brigade, although attached to the 11th Armoured Division, was restricted to operations between the Odon and Orne to protect the Corps flank and to be in a position to attack westwards or towards Caen, as necessary.

Depending on the success of VIII Corps attack, I Corps would then launch two supporting operations codenamed Aberlour and Ottawa. In the former the 3rd Infantry Division, supported by a Canadian infantry brigade, would attack north of Caen; the latter would be a move by the 3rd Canadian Infantry Division and the 2nd Canadian Armoured Brigade to take the village and airfield of Carpiquet. Originally planned for 22 June, Epsom was postponed until 26 June, to make up deficiencies in manpower and materiel. The initial opposition was expected to come from the depleted 12th SS Panzer Division Hitlerjugend ("Hitler Youth"), elements of the 21st Panzer Division, and the Panzer Lehr.

== Operation Martlet ==
On 23 June, the 51st (Highland) Infantry Division attacked with the 152nd (Highland) Infantry Brigade. (Note: 5th Battalion, Queen's Own Cameron Highlanders; 5th Battalion, Seaforth Highlanders; 13th/18th Hussars, with artillery and engineer support.) The Highland infantry advanced towards the village of Sainte-Honorine-la-Chardronette before daybreak, without an artillery bombardment, surprising the German garrison. The Highlanders were counter-attacked by Kampfgruppe von Luck of the 21st Panzer Division during the morning but by midday the village was firmly in British hands. German attention and resources were diverted by the success of the Highlanders as VIII Corps prepared for further attacks out of the Orne bridgehead.

Topography of the area west of Caen

At 0415 on 25 June, the 49th (West Riding) Infantry Division supported by the 8th Armoured Brigade and 250 guns, began Operation Martlet against the junction of the Panzer Lehr and 12th SS Panzer divisions. The first objective, Fontenay-le-Pesnel was fought over all day but stubborn German resistance prevented its capture. An infantry battalion supported by tanks, advanced around the village to the west and took Tessel Wood, where they received several German counter-attacks, which were repulsed by British artillery fire and close air support. By nightfall, the 49th Division had failed to reach Rauray leaving the terrain dominating the right flank of VIII Corps in German hands. Martlet forced the I SS Panzer Corps to commit the remaining tanks of the 12th SS Panzer Division against the XXX Corps front, for a counter-attack the following day. During the night, the Germans in Fontenay-le-Pesnel withdrew to straighten the front line and infantry from the 49th Division secured the village before dawn.

== Battle ==
=== 26 June ===
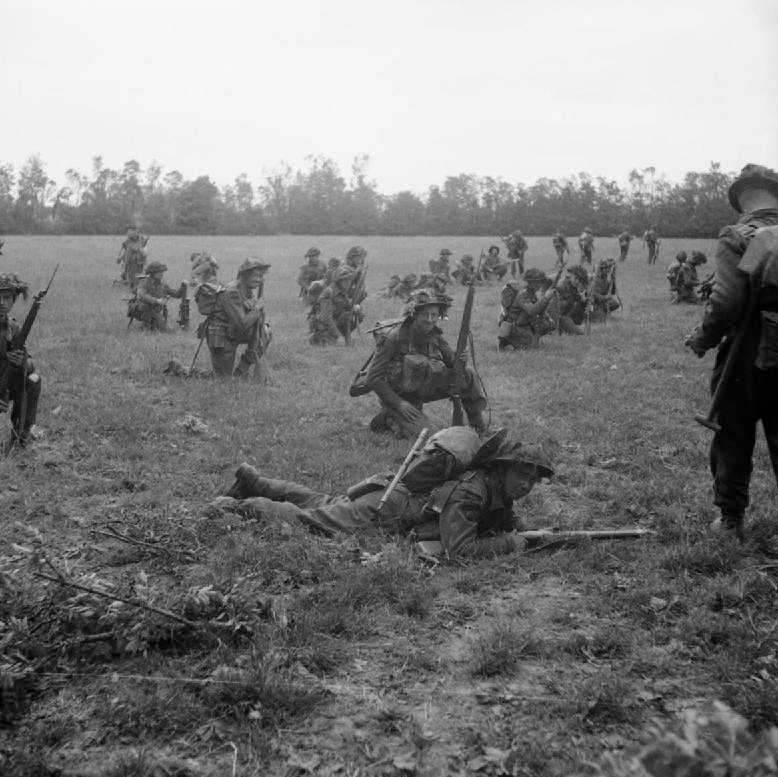
Infantry of the 7th Seaforth Highlanders, 15th (Scottish) Infantry Division, waiting at their start line on 26 June 1944 for the signal to advance.

Poor weather hampered the start of Operation Epsom on 26 June, where rain over the battlefield had made the ground boggy; over the United Kingdom in the early hours, there was a heavy mist resulting in aircraft being grounded and the bombing being called off. No. 83 Group RAF, based in Normandy, were able to provide air support throughout the operation. (Note: No. 83 Group RAF flew over 500 sorties in support of Operation Epsom, despite the weather.)

The 49th (West Riding) Infantry Division resumed Operation Martlet at 0650, although much of its artillery support from VIII Corps was diverted to the main operation. The Germans were able to slow the British advance and then launched an armoured riposte. This initially gained ground but was stalled when British armour moved up and the two sides duelled in the confined terrain. Informed during the afternoon that a big British offensive was under way further east, SS-Standartenführer Kurt Meyer of 12th SS Panzer called off the counter-attack and ordered his tank companies to return to their positions south of Rauray. During the rest of the day the 49th Division was able to make progress, eventually halting just north of Rauray.

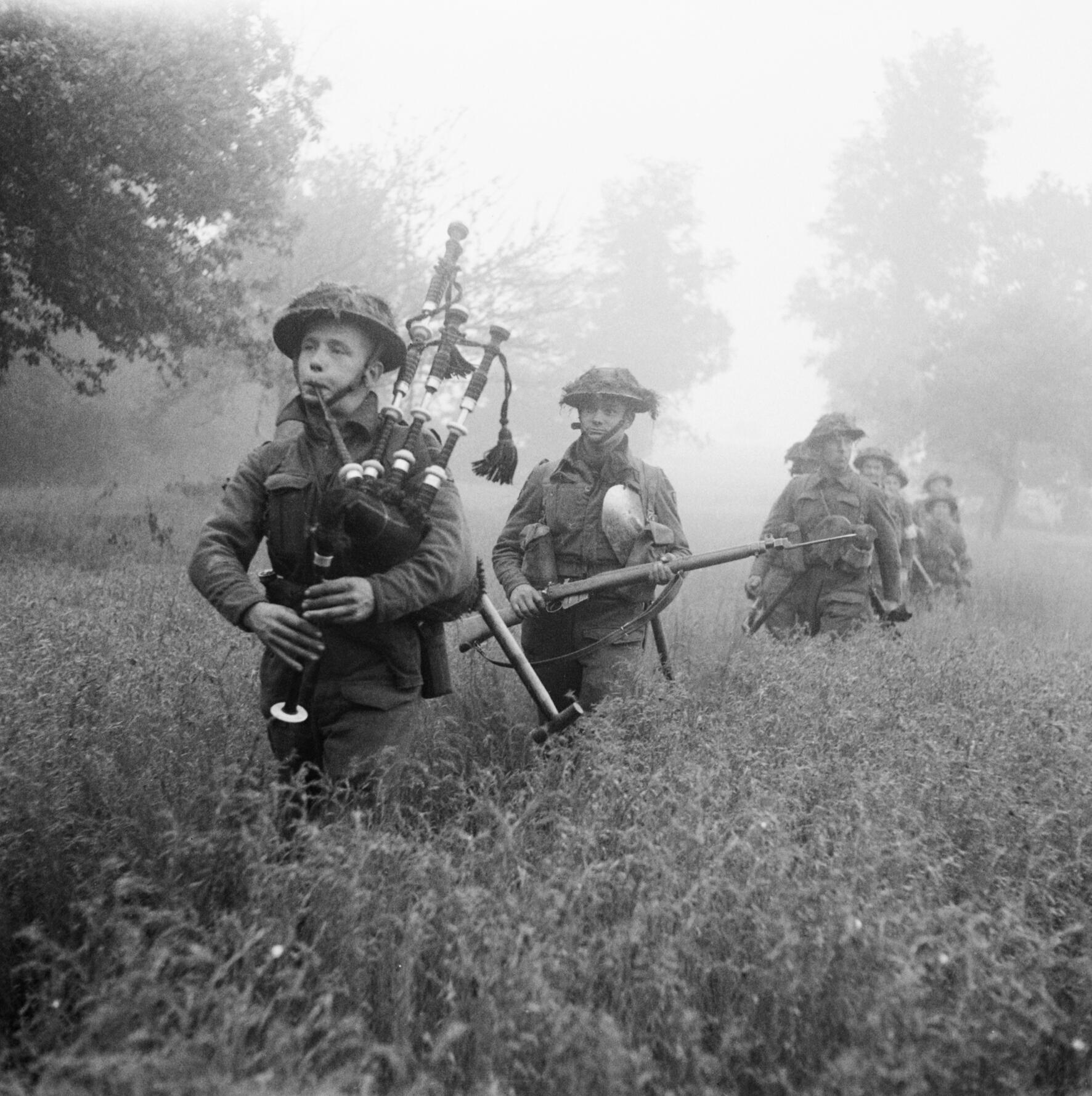
Led by their piper, men of the 7th Battalion, Seaforth Highlanders, part of the 46th (Highland) Brigade, advance, 26 June.

At 0730 the 44th (Lowland) Infantry Brigade and the 46th (Highland) Infantry Brigade of the 15th (Scottish) Infantry Division, supported by the 31st Tank Brigade moved off their start lines behind a rolling barrage fired from 344 guns. The 46th Brigade initially advanced without armoured support, because in bypassing the mine and booby trap-ridden village of Le Mesnil-Patry, its tanks were forced to negotiate more minefields flanking the village. The 2nd Battalion, Glasgow Highlanders faced only light resistance, while the 9th Battalion The Cameronians, ran into the grenadiers of the 12th SS Panzer Division, who had allowed the barrage to pass over their positions before opening fire. Reuniting with their tanks at around 10:00, by midday the two battalions were fighting for control of their initial objectives; Cheux and Le Haut du Bosq.

The 44th Brigade encountered little opposition until coming under machine gun fire at a small stream, following which German resistance was much more determined. Between 08:30 and 09:30, the 6th Battalion, The Royal Scots Fusiliers and the 8th Battalion, The Royal Scots reached their initial objectives of Sainte Manvieu and La Gaule. After much hand to hand fighting they believed the villages to be captured just after midday, although they later found that some German remnants were holding out. Tanks and infantry from the 12th SS and the 21st Panzer divisions launched two counter-attacks to regain Sainte Manvieu but were repulsed with the aid of massed artillery fire. The main German opposition, in this section of their outpost line, had been from part of the I Battalion, 26th Panzergrenadier Regiment, most of which had been overrun and the divisional pioneer battalion. The Germans in Rauray, which had not been captured the previous day, were able to subject the British brigades to observed artillery and indirect tank fire, causing considerable casualties and destruction, especially in Cheux.

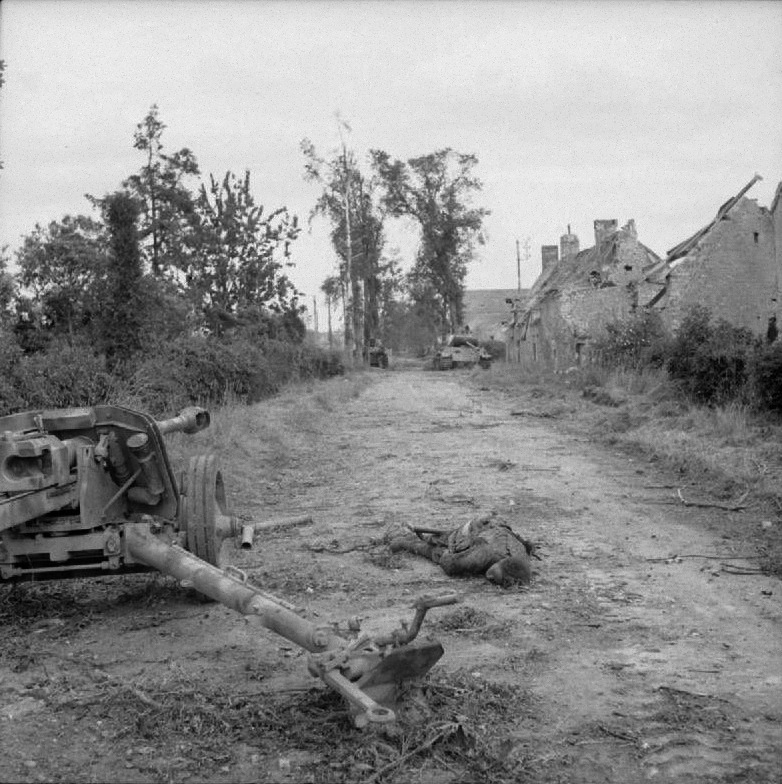
A German 75mm anti-tank gun with a dead crew member lying in the roadway and a disabled Panther tank in Fontenay-le-Pesnel, Operation Martlet.

At 12:50 a squadron of the 11th Armoured Division reconnaissance regiment, north of Cheux, was ordered to advance towards the Odon, preparatory to an attempt by the divisional armoured brigade to rush the bridges. Owing to minefields near the village, debris blocking its streets and German holdouts attacking the tanks, it was not until 14:00 that the regiment was able to make progress. By 14:30 the squadron arrived on a ridge south of Cheux where it was engaged by twenty Panzer IVs, sent by the 12th SS Panzer Division from the Rauray area, Tiger tanks from the 3rd Company 101st Heavy SS Panzer Battalion and tanks from the 21st Panzer Division. More tanks from the 11th Armoured Division arrived but determined German resistance halted any further advance and by the end of the day the division had lost twenty-one tanks.

At 18:00 the 227th (Highland) Brigade of the 15th (Scottish) Infantry Division, was committed to the battle. The Highlanders were delayed by fighting in support of the rest of the division and only two companies from the 2nd Battalion Gordon Highlanders made much progress. They entered the northern outskirts of Colleville by 21:00 but soon found themselves cut off by German counter-attacks. After much confused fighting one company was able to break out and rejoin the battalion. To stop the British offensive, that evening Field Marshal Rommel ordered assistance from all available units of the II SS Panzer Corps.

=== 27 June ===
A Universal Carrier of the 49th (West Riding) Infantry Division during Operation Epsom being used to evacuate wounded.

With no attacks during the night, the German command believed that the British offensive had been contained. During the early hours of 27 June, the II SS Panzer Corps was ordered to resume preparations for its counter-offensive towards Bayeux. On the right of the British advance, the I SS Panzer Corps launched a counter-attack with 80 tanks, which was disorganised by artillery-fire, before foundering on the anti-tank guns of the 49th (West Riding) Infantry Division, who then resumed their attempt to secure VIII Corps flank. Rauray was taken by the 49th Division at 16:00 on 27 June, after further determined fighting against the 12th SS Panzer Division. German forces had been diverted from opposing VIII Corps advance and the fall of Rauray denied the Germans an important observation point, although they remained in control of an area of high ground to the south.

Epsom was resumed at 04:45 by the 10th Battalion, Highland Light Infantry of the 227 (Highland) Infantry Brigade. With support from Churchill tanks; the battalion intended to make a bid for the Odon crossing at Gavrus. The Highlanders immediately ran into stiff opposition from elements of the 12th SS Panzer Division and despite artillery support were unable to advance all day, fighting that was costly for both sides. At 07:30 the 2nd Battalion, Argyll and Sutherland Highlanders, also of the 227th Highland Brigade, launched an attack aimed at capturing the Odon crossing at Tourmauville, north-west of the village of Baron-sur-Odon. With the German forces engaged by the Highland Light Infantry, the Argyll and Sutherland Highlanders supported by the 23rd Hussars, were able to advance to Colleville with relative ease. There the small German garrison supported by 88 mm guns, inflicted many casualties upon the British and denied them the village until the afternoon. The battalion seized the bridge at Tourmauville at around 17:00 and set up a bridgehead. By 19:00, two depleted squadrons of the 23rd Hussars and a company of the 8th Battalion, Rifle Brigade (Prince Consort's Own) had crossed the Odon into the bridgehead.

The remainder of the 15th (Scottish) Infantry Division around Cheux and Sainte Manvieu, was being relieved by the 43rd (Wessex) Infantry Division. When the 5th Battalion, Duke of Cornwall's Light Infantry, of the 214th Infantry Brigade, moved into the outskirts of Cheux, they found that the Scottish infantry had moved on and the vacant position had been reoccupied by grenadiers of 12th SS Panzer Division. After fighting to recapture the position, at 09:30 the battalion was counter-attacked by six Panthers of the 2nd Panzer Division. The attack penetrated Cheux and several British anti-tank guns were destroyed before it was beaten off. (Note: One tank was able to flee, another turned over and four were knocked by PIATs.) Further attacks by the 2nd Panzer Division were halted but the entire front was "a mass of small engagements". For the rest of the morning and afternoon, the Scottish infantry and the 4th and 29th Armoured brigades expanded the salient north of the Odon and secured the rear of the Argyll and Sutherland Highlanders. During late evening the men of the 159th Infantry Brigade (11th Armoured Division) were transported in trucks through the narrow "Scottish Corridor" to Tourville, where they dismounted and crossed the Odon on foot to reinforce the bridgehead. During the night Kampfgruppe Weidinger, a 2,500-strong battle group from the 2nd SS Panzer Division arrived at the front and was placed under the command of the Panzer Lehr Division.

=== 28 June ===
During the early hours of 28 June, a battle group of the 1st SS Panzer Division, Kampfgruppe Frey, arrived at the front and was placed under the command of the 12th SS Panzer Division. At 0810, General Friedrich Dollmann, the 7th Army commander, ordered SS-Obergruppenführer Paul Hausser to divert the II SS Panzer Corps, to counter-attack south of Cheux. Hausser replied that no counter-attack could be launched until the following day, as so many of his units had yet to reach the front. The German command was thrown into disarray by Dollmann's sudden death, when Rommel and Gerd von Rundstedt (OB West) were en route to a conference with Hitler and out of touch with the situation. (Note: Wilmot wrote that there was no record or suggestion that Dollmann committed suicide and that Dollmann's chief of staff claimed he "died of heart failure in his bathroom". Other authors wrote that Dollmann killed himself.) It was not until 1500 that Hausser was appointed commander of the 7th Army, with Willi Bittrich replacing him as commander of II SS Panzer Corps. (Hausser was advised to retain control of the Corps until the following morning.) Pending the return of Rommel to Normandy, Hausser was also to be supreme commander in the invasion area. At 1700 the command structure was changed again; the 7th Army under Hausser would be responsible for the invasion front facing the American army, while the Panzer Group West (General Geyr von Schweppenburg) was to be responsible for the invasion front facing the Anglo-Canadian forces. (Note: An organisational chart of the German command structure in the West, presented within 'The Struggle for Europe', shows that Geyr was still in command and not succeeded by Heinrich Eberbach until 2 July. The historians Lloyd Clark and Michael Reynolds both claim that Geyr was still in command of Panzer Group West during Operation Epsom. Chapter IV, footnote 14, in 'Sons of the Reich' states that the RAF attack on Geyr's headquarters on 10 June only slightly wounded him, although his chief of staff and 16 other staff were killed. The British official history of the fighting in Normandy records that Geyr was not succeeded by Eberbach until 4 July, after disagreeing with Hitler's wishes on how the campaign should be conducted; he was removed in the dismissals that saw Kluge replace Rundstedt.)

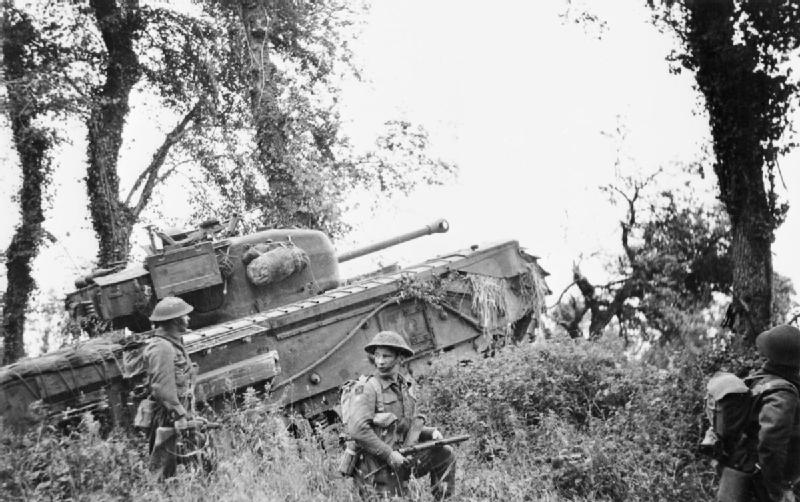
A Churchill tank of 7th Royal Tank Regiment, 31st Tank Brigade, supporting infantry of 8th Royal Scots during Operation Epsom, 28 June 1944.

At 0530 elements of the 15th (Scottish) Infantry Division with tank support, launched a new assault to capture the village of Grainville-sur-Odon. After shelling and close quarter street fighting, the Scots secured the village by 1300 hours; German counter-attacks followed but were repulsed. At 0600 the Germans began two strong flanking attacks, with the intention of pinching out the British salient. Kampfgruppe Frey on the eastern flank, launched an attack north of the Odon, supported by Panzer IVs of the 21st Panzer Division. This reached the villages of Mouen and Tourville but the British counter-attacked from the direction of Cheux, resulting in confused heavy fighting throughout the day. Frey's battle group managed to gain control of Mouen and British counter-attacks supported by tanks halted any further advance but were unable to retake the village. British patrols found Marcelet partly empty, the German front line having been pulled back towards Carpiquet.

On the western flank, Kampfgruppe Weidinger supported by Panthers, tried to recapture Brettevillette, Grainville-sur-Odon and ultimately Mondrainville. The British defenders (Brettevillette and on Point 110: the 1st Battalion Tyneside Scottish, 11th Battalion Durham Light Infantry (49th (West Riding) Infantry Division) and 4th/7th Dragoon Guards (8th Armoured Brigade). In Grainville-sur-Odon and le Valtru: 7th Battalion Seaforth Highlanders, 9th Battalion Cameronians (Scottish Rifles) and 9th Royal Tank Regiment.) held their positions, launching local counter-attacks to retake lost ground and eventually the German offensive was stopped, within 0.6 mi (0.97 km) of linking up with the lead elements of Kampfgruppe Frey.

South of the Odon, at 0900 the Argyll and Sutherland Highlanders advanced out of the bridgehead, to capture a bridge north of the village of Gavrus. Heavy fighting took place into the afternoon before both village and bridge were in Scottish hands. Infantry from the 11th Armoured Division, expanded the bridgehead by taking the village of Baron-sur-Odon and the 23rd Hussars with infantry advanced on Hill 112 (49°7′7″N 0°27′34″W). Having secured its northern slope and dislodged the defenders from its crest, they were unable to advance further, due to the Germans dug in on the reverse slope. Several counter-attacks were launched by 12th SS Panzer and the battered Hussars were relieved at 1500 by the 3rd Royal Tank Regiment but neither side was able to take complete control of the hill. The 11th Armoured Division had lost nearly 40 tanks on its slopes by the end of the day and was surrounded on three sides but troops managed to reach and reinforce the position.

=== 29 June ===
With the weather improving over the United Kingdom and Normandy, Hausser's preparations for his counter stroke came under continual harassment from Allied aircraft and artillery fire, delaying the start of the attack to the afternoon. From the number of German reinforcements arriving in the VIII Corps sector and aerial reconnaissance, O'Connor suspected that the Germans were organising a counter-stroke. XXX Corps was still some way to the north, leaving the VIII Corps right flank vulnerable, O'Connor postponed attacks by I Corps and ordered VIII Corps onto the defensive. Dempsey, privy to ULTRA decrypts of intercepted German signal traffic, knew the counter-attack was coming and approved O'Connor's precautions. VIII Corps began to reorganise to meet the attack. Supply echelons for Hausser's divisions were located in the Évrecy–Noyers-Bocage–Villers-Bocage area and were the focus of RAF fighter-bomber attention throughout the morning and early afternoon; the RAF claimed the destruction of over 200 vehicles.

VIII Corps also launched spoiling attacks, at 0800 1st Battalion Worcestershire Regiment, from the 43rd Division, assaulted Mouen, without tanks behind an artillery barrage. By 1100 the battalion had forced the 1st SS Panzer Division panzergrenadiers back and the 7th Battalion Somerset Light Infantry moved up and dug in on the Caen–Villers-Bocage road. The 129th Brigade of the 43rd Division, swept the woods and orchards around Tourville-sur-Odon, before crossing the river north of Baron-sur-Odon and clearing the south bank. An attempt by the 44th Brigade of the 15th Division to advance towards the Odon and link up with the force holding the Gavrus bridges failed, leaving this position isolated and in the salient the 44th Battalion Royal Tank Regiment failed to capture Hill 113 (49°6′14″N 0°30′45″W) north of Évrecy, after clashing with 10th SS Panzer Division and losing six tanks. Elements of the 11th Armoured Division attacked Esquay-Notre-Dame west of Hill 112 but were repulsed and an attack by the 8th Rifle Brigade and the 3rd Royal Tank Regiment on the southern slope of the hill, drove the Germans from the position.

German SS-Panzergrenadiers dug in near Hill 112.

Hausser intended that the 9th SS Panzer Division, with Kampfgruppe Weidinger protecting its left flank, to cut across the British salient north of the Odon, while the 10th SS Panzer Division retook Gavrus and Hill 112 south of the river. The 9th SS Panzer attack began at 1400, heavily supported by artillery. The 19th and 20th SS Panzergrenadier Regiments supported by Panthers, Panzer IV's and assault guns attacked Grainville, le Haut du Bosq and le Valtru, aiming for Cheux. (Note: A German regiment is the equivalent of a British brigade.) A British company was overrun and tanks and infantry penetrated le Valtru, where anti-tank guns knocked out four German tanks in the village and artillery fire forced their supporting infantry to withdraw. Confused fighting, at times hand-to-hand, took place outside Grainville and the Panzergrenadiers captured a tactically important wood, before being forced back by a British counter-attack. The Panzergrenadiers claimed they also captured Grainville but no British sources support this and by nightfall British infantry were in control of the village.

At around 1600, the British captured an officer of the 9th SS Panzer Division who was conducting a reconnaissance. He was found to be carrying a map and notebook containing details of new attacks. (Note: Wilmot claims that this officer was carrying a copy of the II SS Panzer Corps plan of attack. Ellis states this officer was carrying the plans of the counter-attack for which he was reconnoitring. Jackson states these captured documents were the plans of the captured officer's brigade (regiment).) Around 1830, the Germans attacked the 15th (Scottish) Infantry Division on the right flank. One unit was being relieved and in the confusion, German tanks and infantry slipped through the British defences, with some units advancing 2 mi (3.2 km) before running into heavy resistance. By 2300, the attack by the 9th SS Panzer had been stopped. Supporting attacks against the British eastern flank had been planned but German tank concentrations assembling in the Carpiquet area, had been so severely disrupted by RAF fighter-bombers during the afternoon, that the attacks never materialised.

The 10th SS Panzer Division launched its attack behind schedule at 1430. Following clashes earlier in the day the British were waiting but after five hours of battle, the Scottish infantry defending Gavrus had been pushed back into a pocket around the bridge, north of the village. An artillery bombardment caused the Germans to withdraw but the British did not reoccupy the village. Moving towards Hill 113, the 2nd Grenadier Battalion, Panzergrenadier Regiment 21 and 2nd Battalion, Panzer Regiment 10 of 10th SS Panzer ran into the 44th Battalion The Royal Tank Regiment and 2nd Battalion (The King's Royal Rifle Corps) in Évrecy, who thwarted their attempt to occupy the hill. Dealing with this obstacle took the remainder of the day and the attack on Hill 112 was postponed. The Germans claimed the destruction of 28 tanks while the British recorded the loss of 12.

Believing the German attacks on 29 June indicated more counter-attacks for the following day, Dempsey reinforced the Odon bridgehead with a brigade of the 43rd division and pulled in its perimeter. The 159th Infantry Brigade of the 11th Armoured Division was placed under the command of the 15th (Scottish) Infantry Division and acceding to O’Connor’s wishes for additional infantry, Dempsey attached the newly arrived 53rd (Welsh) Infantry Division to VIII Corps; the lead brigade arrived near the Epsom start line during the night. To hold Hill 112, it was necessary hold Évrecy and Hill 113 for which there were insufficient troops and Dempsey ordered the 29th Armoured Brigade to abandon the hill. To hold the area between Rauray and the Odon, Dempsey withdrew the 29th Armoured Brigade north across the river after dark, ready for the expected German offensive.

=== 30 June ===
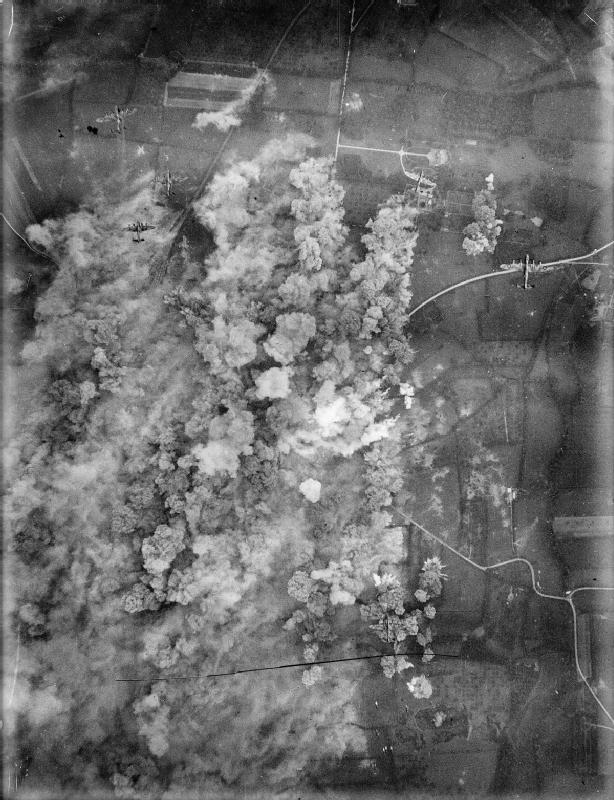
The town of Villers-Bocage, photographed during the bombing raid on 30 June 1944 being attacked by 256 RAF heavy bombers dropping 1,100 tons of bombs.

Bittrich ordered a resumption of the offensive during the night of 29–30 June, hoping to avoid Allied air support. The 19th and 20th Regiments of the 9th SS Panzer Division, renewed their attacks against Grainville-sur-Odon and le Valtru in the dark but little progress was made against the 11th Armoured Division north of the Odon and heavy British artillery bombardments. At 0120, the 10th SS Panzer Division started to move towards Hill 112 and at dawn, covered by a heavy artillery barrage they assaulted the vacated British positions. Unaware that the British had pulled back, Panzergrenadiers and tanks of the 10th SS Panzer advanced on the hill from the south and south-west and infantry from 12th SS Panzer attacked from the east and south-east. Meeting no opposition, by noon the Germans had occupied the hill. A British counter-attack and artillery fire broke up a follow-up attack towards Baron-sur-Odon.

Bittrich called off further offensive action against VIII Corps. In the evening Hausser, commanding the 7th Army, informed Rommel's headquarters that his counter-attacks had been temporarily suspended due to "tenacious enemy resistance" and intensive Allied artillery and naval gunfire. Unaware of this and believing that more German attacks would follow, Dempsey closed down Operation Epsom. The front gradually settled down save for skirmishing, although both sides spent the remainder of the day heavily shelling one another. The battleship HMS Rodney contributed by bombarding villages suspected of containing German headquarters; one was later found to have housed the headquarters of the I SS Panzer Corps. With no further British offensive moves due, in the afternoon the Gavrus bridges were given up, the Scottish defenders being withdrawn across the Odon. At 2030 the town of Villers-Bocage, a vital traffic centre for the German forces, was destroyed by 250 RAF heavy bombers. It had been intended to catch German troops by the bombing but only French civilians were present.

=== 1 July ===
A Waffen-SS Soldier reloads a German 81 mm mortar. German forces used mortars extensively and they allegedly accounted for 70 per cent of British casualties in Normandy.

The II SS Panzer Corps resumed its counter offensive on 1 July, after spending most of the preceding 24 hours regrouping. Unaware that the British had ended their operation and with overcast weather interfering with Allied air support, Bittrich believed he had an opportunity to prevent the 11th Armoured Division continuing its advance across the Orne. Before dawn the 10th SS Panzer Division advanced, supported by heavy mortar and artillery fire. The Germans took the village of Baron-sur-Odon quickly but a counter-attack by the 31st Tank Brigade retook it by noon. Heavy shelling broke up other attacks by 10th SS Panzer from Hill 112 and British patrols later found c. 300–400 dead Panzergrenadiers on the northern slope of the hill.

The 9th SS Panzer Division spent the day attempting to force the British lines between Rauray and the Odon. Supplemented by Panzergrenadiers of the 2nd SS Panzer Division and following a preliminary bombardment, tanks and infantry of 9th SS Panzer advanced behind a smoke screen and broke through the outer British defences. The Germans were stopped by secondary positions in front of Rauray and on high ground to the south-east, although some troops penetrated as far as Haut du Bosq. Further German attacks throughout the day, were met with intense artillery fire and made no progress, in the early evening a British counter-attack with Sherman and flame-throwing Churchill Crocodile tanks restored the original front line. The attacks were costly for both sides, thirty German tanks were claimed destroyed, mostly by the 49th (West Riding) Infantry Division, troops of the 12th SS Panzer Division had been repulsed during the morning and artillery fire halted attacks from other formations.

== Aftermath ==
=== Analysis ===
Having had to commit his last reserves to contain the British offensive, on 29 June Rommel requested permission from Hitler to allow the 7th Army to begin a fighting withdrawal towards the River Seine; a move which would be mirrored by German forces in southern France to form a new front line along the Seine towards the Swiss border. This was partially endorsed by Hausser, who on 30 June proposed a retirement from Caen. Encouraged by the fighting in the valley of the Odon, Hitler stated that "we must not allow mobile warfare to develop", committing his troops in Normandy to "a policy of aggressive and unyielding defence". On 2 July, British patrols obtained the first evidence of this, reporting that south of the Odon the Germans were digging in. Aerial photographs taken two days later showed large numbers of new weapon positions and by 8 July, the German forces facing VIII Corps were dug in. Some local adjustments occurred as both sides sought to improve their tactical position and the 12th SS Panzer Division captured Fontaine-Étoupefour on 2 July.

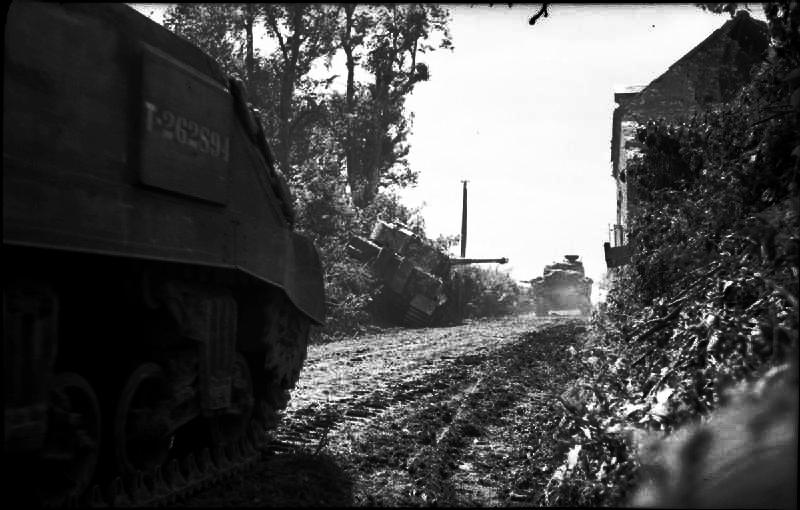
British Sherman tanks pass a knocked out Tiger tank

VIII Corps, in battle for the first time, had broken through elaborate German defensive positions and advanced nearly 6 mi (9.7 km). By throwing in their last reserves, the Germans had been able to achieve a defensive success at the operational level, by containing the British offensive. More than 4,000 casualties were inflicted upon the British but the effort cost the Germans more than 3,000 men. The German commanders had been forced to commit their armoured reserves piecemeal to meet threats as they developed, counter-attacking at a disadvantage. Over 120 German tanks were destroyed, the organisation of the remaining forces was disrupted and their offensive power much reduced. With few infantry divisions to relieve them, the panzer divisions were forced to remain in the front line rather than disengaging to recover.

Stephen Hart wrote in 2007 that post-war memoirs by Allied generals led to disputes along national lines during the 1950s and 1960s, with American historians generally critical of Montgomery and the actions of the Anglo-Canadian forces, while "pro-Montgomery" historians set out to refute them. Also published during this period were the national official campaign histories, which were thoroughly researched but avoided detailed critical analysis of the controversies. During the 1980s, revisionist writers concentrated on the perceived deficiencies of the Allies and since the late 1990s, two schools of thought have been revising the revisionists, some expanding on revisionist work by providing a more detailed campaign analysis and those who have tried to show that the techniques employed by the Anglo-Canadian forces were realistic for the circumstances encountered Normandy.

In 1983, Carlo D’Este wrote that the most logical place for a British attack would have been out of the Orne bridgehead, on the extreme eastern flank of the Allied lodgement. An attack from the eastern flank had been rejected by Montgomery, Dempsey and O’Connor as unrealistic. Some writers described the intent of Epsom as an attack to gain ground but in 2004, Andrew Williams wrote that through Ultra decodes, Montgomery knew of Rommel's plan to attack towards Bayeux and that Epsom was intended to forestall it. Chester Wilmot wrote in 1952 that the operation was intended to draw the I SS Panzer Corps and the newly arrived II SS Panzer Corps into battle around Caen. Hart wrote that Montgomery wanted to keep the initiative and prevent German armoured forces from moving from to the west against the US First Army or being relieved and forming a reserve. The arrival of the II SS Panzer Corps was a catalyst for Operation Epsom, which retaining the initiative by forcing the German command to use the Corps against VIII Corps. Max Hastings wrote in 1985 that "no sane commander" would mount an attack as big as Epsom without "every hope of breaking through the German defences, or at least of causing the enemy to make substantial withdrawals". Carlo D’Este wrote that "No amount of pretence can conceal that the real object had been a short pincer movement to outflank Caen".

Lloyd Clark wrote, "On the battlefield, Epsom ended, rather ignominiously, in a sort of draw" and that judging the effects of Operation Epsom is hampered by disagreement about Montgomery's intent. In written orders Montgomery required an advance across the Orne River and the capture of high ground south of Caen, which was prevented by the defenders. Clark wrote that there were implicit objectives with strategic implications, more important than the capture of ground. In 1971, Stephen Ambrose wrote of Epsom veering off-course from the plan and D'Este that Epsom was "an operation of immense intentions which were not attained", calling it a "dismal failure". In 2004, Simon Trew and Stephen Badsey wrote of the British battle that it "... took most of six Panzer Divisions to stop Epsom short of its final objectives...." and Michael Reynolds in 2002 wrote that without the commitment of the six divisions, it was highly likely that the British offensive would have achieved its goals. Ian Daglish in 2007 wrote that while the original concept of Epsom had failed, the offensive was a strategic success. By withdrawing the 11th Armoured Division across the Odon and then into reserve, the Second Army had re-created the threat of an offensive near Caen. By the end of June, all German armoured forces in Normandy were concentrated on the Second Army front.

Milton Shulman had written in 1947 that with the defeat of its second armoured counter-attack in June, the German command had thrown away its most effective troops and Reynolds wrote that while the operation was costly for the British, it caused grievous losses to the Germans. In the VIII Corps history published in 1945, G. S. Jackson wrote that Epsom failed in its overt goal but that "when seen as part of Montgomery's series of rapid and consecutive blows against the German Army in Normandy, the importance of Epsom becomes more apparent and there is little doubt that it did play a significant part in the Allies' eventual success in the region". D'Este wrote that the losses inflicted on the German army were "purely in terms of men and material". Terry Copp, in 2003, wrote that too much emphasis had been given to a win-lose criterion, whereas a cost-benefit approach provided more insight. Describing the standard German practice of counter-attacking when driven from a position, Copp wrote that the Germans courted losses that could not be readily replaced, "One such counter-attack on 22 July resulted in 10SS regaining control of the Bon Repas [sic]–Évrecy road, a clear victory in a win-lose narrative but a typical German defeat in any cost-benefit analysis".

In 2013, Buckley wrote that by 1 July, there was a stalemate in which the British were established south of the Odon but retired from Hill 112, which may have been premature. The Germans had maintained a continuous front but only by using reserves which made it impossible to begin the counter-offensive planned by Panzergruppe West, which made the offensive a considerable Allied success, as part of a strategy of attrition based on organised fire power. Looked on as an attempt to break through and force the Germans out of Caen the operation failed but in terms of Montgomery's strategy it was a costly victory. The German defence of Normandy never recovered from the damage inflicted during Epsom, the initiative was lost and German counter-attack tactics failed in the face of Allied fire power, with even greater cost than that inflicted on the British; the German command structure and assumptions on which the defence was based were undermined.

=== Casualties ===
Lloyd Clark wrote that the 15th (Scottish) Infantry Division suffered casualties of 2,331 men, 288 killed, 1,638 wounded and 794 missing from 27 June to 2 July. John Buckley gave casualties for the division as 2,700, including 300 men killed, 25 per cent of the casualties incurred from June 1944 to May 1945 and that the other units in the operation had 2,500 casualties. The casualties among the 11th Armoured Division and 43rd (Wessex) Infantry Division, were 1,256 men, 257 being killed in the 11th Armoured Division. No figures are provided for the 49th (West Riding) Infantry Division, 51st (Highland) Infantry Division or the 8th Armoured Brigade that conducted Operation Martlet and attacks in support of Epsom. From 26 to 30 June, VIII Corps suffered 470 fatal casualties, 2,187 wounded and 706 missing. On 1 July, a further 488 men were killed and wounded and 227 men were reported missing. These figures exclude formations in Operation Martlet and attacks in support of Epsom. The Germans suffered more than 3,000 casualties during Epsom; the 9th SS Panzer Division suffered 1,145, the 10th SS Panzer Division 571 and the 12th SS Panzer Division 1,244 casualties. The Germans lost 126 tanks from 26 June to midnight on 1 July, 41 Panthers and 25 Tigers among them. In 2015, Stephen Napier published new figures for 125 German and 150 British tank losses. (Note: Sixty Panzer IV, thirty Panthers, eight Tigers and 17 StuG III. British losses were 64 Shermans, ten Sherman Vc, 14 Cromwells, 27 Stuarts and 35 Churchills needing at least 24 hours to repair to being write-offs.)

=== Subsequent operations ===
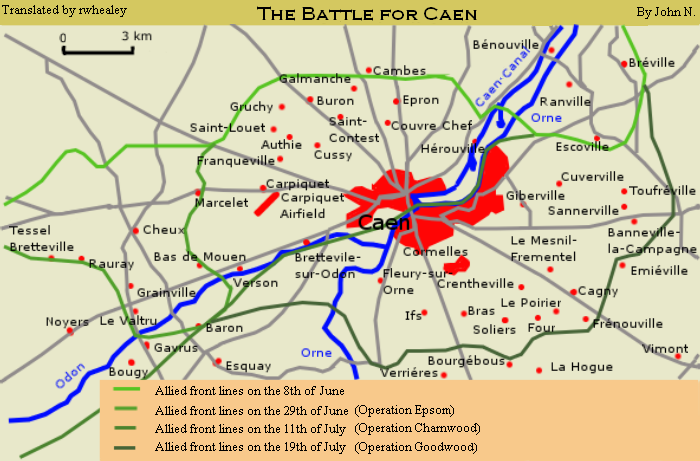
Operations in the vicinity of Caen.

The increasingly costly static defence led to disputes in the German high command. On the evening of 1 July in a conversation with Wilhelm Keitel, Rundstedt said "Make peace, you fools." Shortly afterwards, Günther von Kluge replaced him as Commander in Chief West. Due to his disagreements with Hitler over how the campaign should be conducted, Geyr was replaced by Heinrich Eberbach as commander of Panzer Group West.

During the lull both sides made changes to their dispositions. The 53rd (Welsh) Infantry Division relieved the 15th (Scottish) Infantry Division in the west of the British salient, while the 43rd (Wessex) Infantry Division relieved the infantry of the 11th Armoured Division who were still holding the Odon bridgehead. The Germans moved up the 277th Infantry Division which began to relieve the 9th SS Panzer Division and the battle group of the 2nd SS Panzer Division.

A few days later the British Second Army launched Operation Charnwood, to take Caen. This incorporated the postponed attack on Carpiquet, originally planned for Epsom as Operation Ottawa but now codenamed Operation Windsor. In a frontal assault the northern half of the city was captured, with the remaining portions being taken during Operations Atlantic and Goodwood in the third week of July. Fighting in the Odon Valley continued and on 10 July Operation Jupiter was launched by VIII Corps to push back the German forces near the village of Baron-sur-Odon, retake Hill 112 and advance to the River Orne. The Second Battle of the Odon began on 15 July to divert German attention from the ground where Operation Goodwood was to take place. The second battle has been called one of the bloodiest encounters of the campaign.

=== Battle honours ===
The British and Commonwealth system of battle honours recognised participation in Operation Epsom in 1956, 1957 and 1958, by the award to 34 units of the battle honour Odon, for service on and around the river from 25 June to 2 July 1944. The award was accompanied by honours for four actions during the operation: Fontenay le Pesnil on 26–27 June, Cheux from 26–27 June, Tourmauville Bridge on 27 June and Defence of Rauray from 29 June – 2 July.

== Notes ==
"By the time Epsom was launched, the majority of reinforcing German armour was either facing the Anglo-Canadians or were en route to that sector of the front. Even as Epsom was being fought, the newly arrived II SS Panzer Corps was introduced, piecemeal to the battlefield in a bid to stop British VIII Corps. By the end of June, eight Panzer divisions (containing approximately 700 tanks) had been identified in the Caen area." Andrew Harrison, Caen, Cobra and Confusion: Has Montgomery’s Normandy Campaign Been Understood and its Legacy Fairly Assessed? page 46 Final thesis
