= Bougy =

- Commune
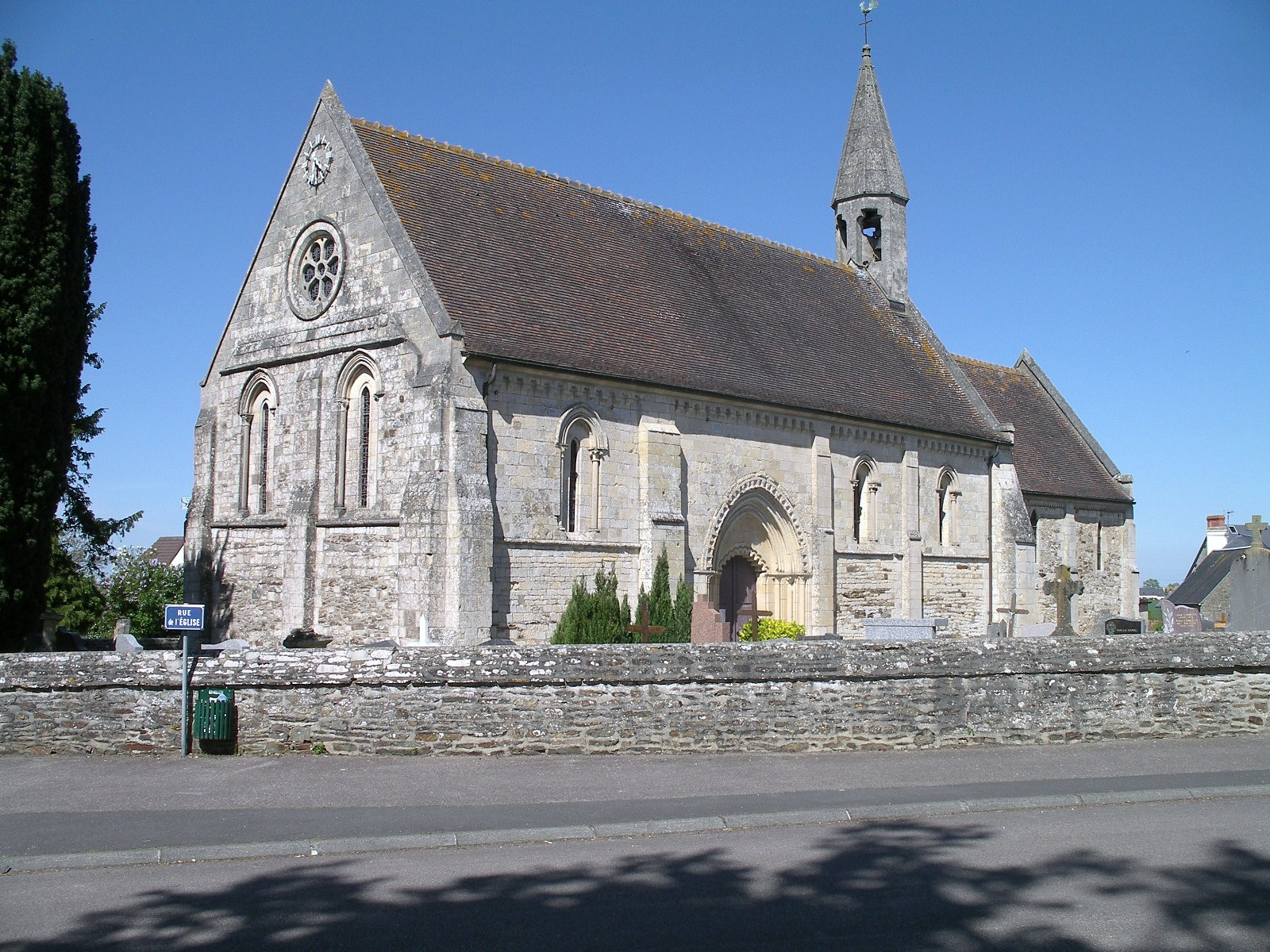
- The church in Bougy

- Coat of arms
- Location of Bougy
- Location within France Location within Normandy
- Coordinates: 49°06′46″N 0°31′23″W
- Country: France
- Region: Normandy
- Department: Calvados
- Arrondissement: Caen
- Canton: Évrecy

Government
  - Mayor (2020–2026): Regis Collet
- Area^{1}: 3.03 km^{2} (1.17 sq mi)
- Elevation: 90 m (300 ft)
- Highest elevation: 117 m (384 ft)
- Lowest elevation: 50 m (160 ft)
- Population (2023): 376
  - Density: 124/km^{2} (321/sq mi)
- Time zone: UTC+01:00 (CET)
  - Summer (DST): UTC+02:00 (CEST)
- INSEE/Postal code: 14089 /14210
- ^{1} French Land Register data, which excludes lakes, ponds, glaciers > 1 km^{2} (0.386 sq mi or 247 acres) and river estuaries.

Bougy is a commune in the Calvados department in the Normandy region in northwestern France.

== Geography ==
The river Odon flows through the commune.

== Population ==
Historical population
Year	Pop.	±% p.a.
1968	115	—
1975	120	+0.61%
1982	148	+3.04%
1990	256	+7.09%
1999	256	+0.00%
2007	414	+6.19%
2012	448	+1.59%
2017	402	−2.14%
2023	376	−1.11%
Source: INSEE

== Points of Interest ==
=== National Heritage sites ===
The Commune has two buildings and areas listed as a Monument historique

- Eglise Saint-Pierre a fourteenth-century church listed as a monument in 1911.
- Château de Bougy an eighteenth-century building listed as a monument in 2000.

== Twin towns – sister cities ==
Bougy, along with Éterville, Évrecy, Baron-sur-Odon & Gavrus is twinned with:

- Gaukönigshofen, Germany

== See also ==
- Communes of the Calvados department
