= Gaukönigshofen =

- Municipality
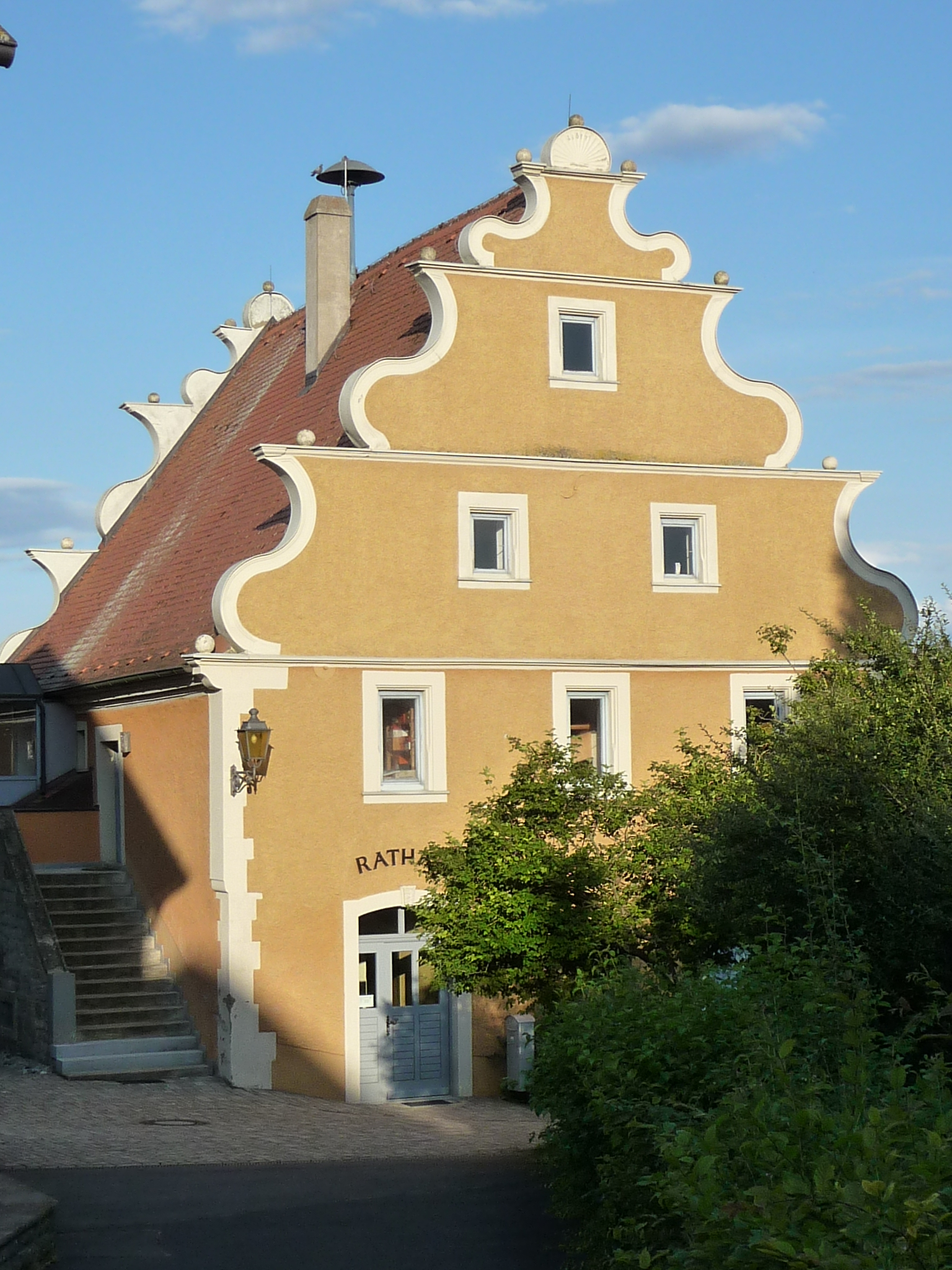
- Town hall

- Coat of arms

- Location of Gaukönigshofen within Würzburg district
- Interactive map of Gaukönigshofen
- Location within Germany Location within Bavaria
- Coordinates: 49°38′N 10°0′E
- Country: Germany
- State: Bavaria
- Admin. region: Unterfranken
- District: Würzburg

Government
  - Mayor (2020–26): Johannes Menth (Ind.)

Area
  - Total: 31.98 km^{2} (12.35 sq mi)
- Elevation: 270 m (890 ft)

Population (2025-12-31)
  - Total: 2,445
  - Density: 76.45/km^{2} (198.0/sq mi)
- Time zone: UTC+01:00 (CET)
  - Summer (DST): UTC+02:00 (CEST)
- Postal codes: 97253
- Dialling codes: 09337
- Vehicle registration: WÜ, OCH
- Website: www.gaukoenigshofen.de

Gaukönigshofen is a municipality in the district of Würzburg in Bavaria in Germany.

== Twin towns – sister cities ==
Gaukönigshofen, is twinned with:

- Bougy, France
- Évrecy, France
- Baron-sur-Odon, France
- Gavrus, France
- Éterville, France
