= Éterville =

- Commune
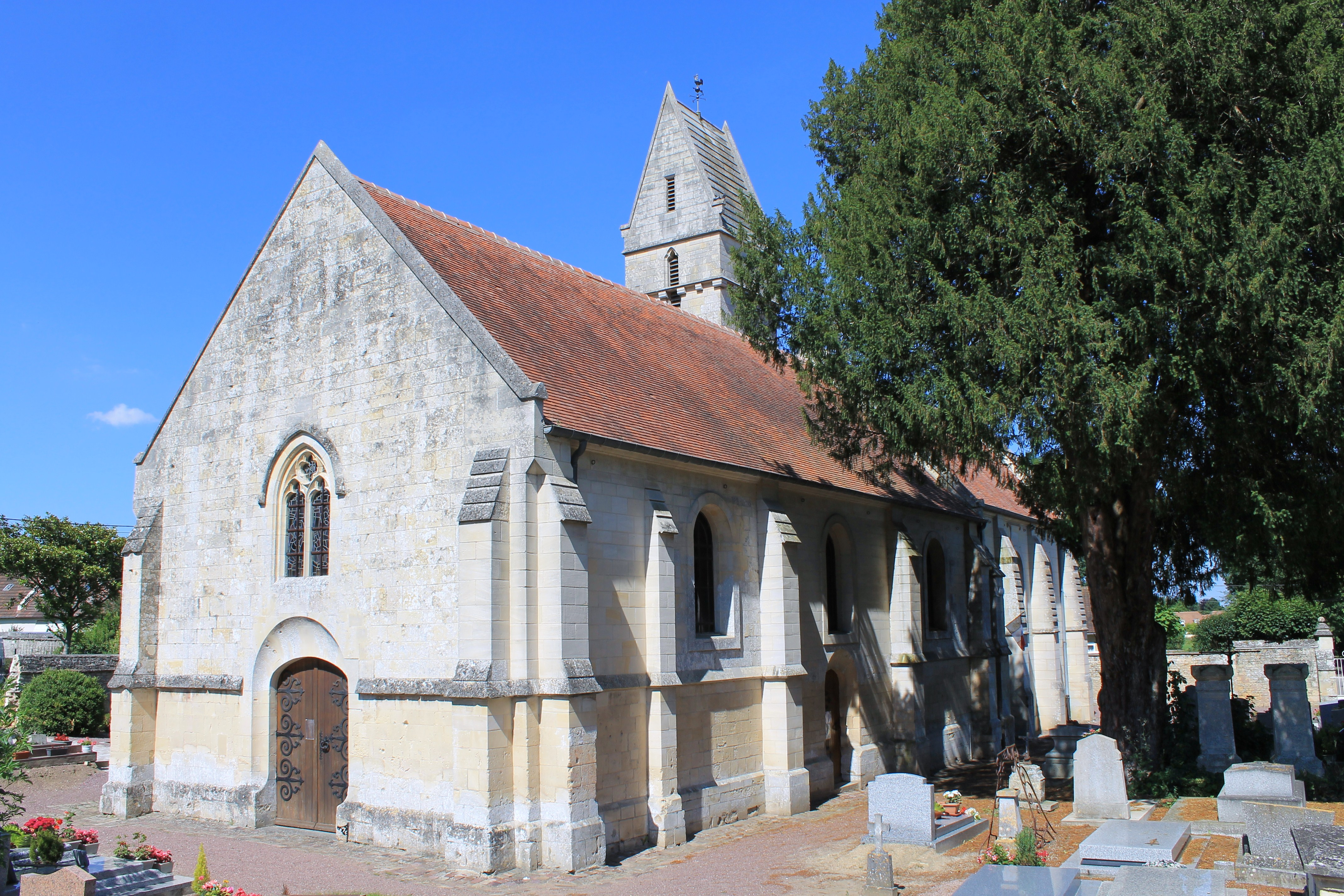
- St. John the Baptist church
- Location of Éterville
- Location within France Location within Normandy
- Coordinates: 49°08′41″N 0°25′27″W
- Country: France
- Region: Normandy
- Department: Calvados
- Arrondissement: Caen
- Canton: Caen-5
- Intercommunality: CU Caen la Mer

Government
  - Mayor (2020–2026): Thierry Saint
- Area^{1}: 4.87 km^{2} (1.88 sq mi)
- Elevation: 24 m (79 ft)
- Highest elevation: 78 m (256 ft)
- Lowest elevation: 12 m (39 ft)
- Population (2023): 1,529
  - Density: 314/km^{2} (813/sq mi)
- Time zone: UTC+01:00 (CET)
  - Summer (DST): UTC+02:00 (CEST)
- INSEE/Postal code: 14254 /14930
- ^{1} French Land Register data, which excludes lakes, ponds, glaciers > 1 km^{2} (0.386 sq mi or 247 acres) and river estuaries.

Éterville is a commune in the Calvados department in the Normandy region in northwestern France.

== Geography ==
The commune is made up of the following collection of villages and hamlets, Rocreuil and Éterville.

The river Odon flows through the commune. In addition a stream the Ruisseau de Maltot traverses the commune.

== Population ==
Historical population
Year	Pop.	±% p.a.
1968	319	—
1975	378	+2.45%
1982	493	+3.87%
1990	766	+5.66%
1999	1,043	+3.49%
2007	1,351	+3.29%
2012	1,389	+0.56%
2017	1,631	+3.26%
2023	1,529	−1.07%
Source: INSEE

== Twin towns – sister cities ==
Éterville, along with Bougy, Évrecy, Baron-sur-Odon & Gavrus is twinned with:

- Gaukönigshofen, Germany

== See also ==
- Communes of the Calvados department
