= Gavrus =

- Commune
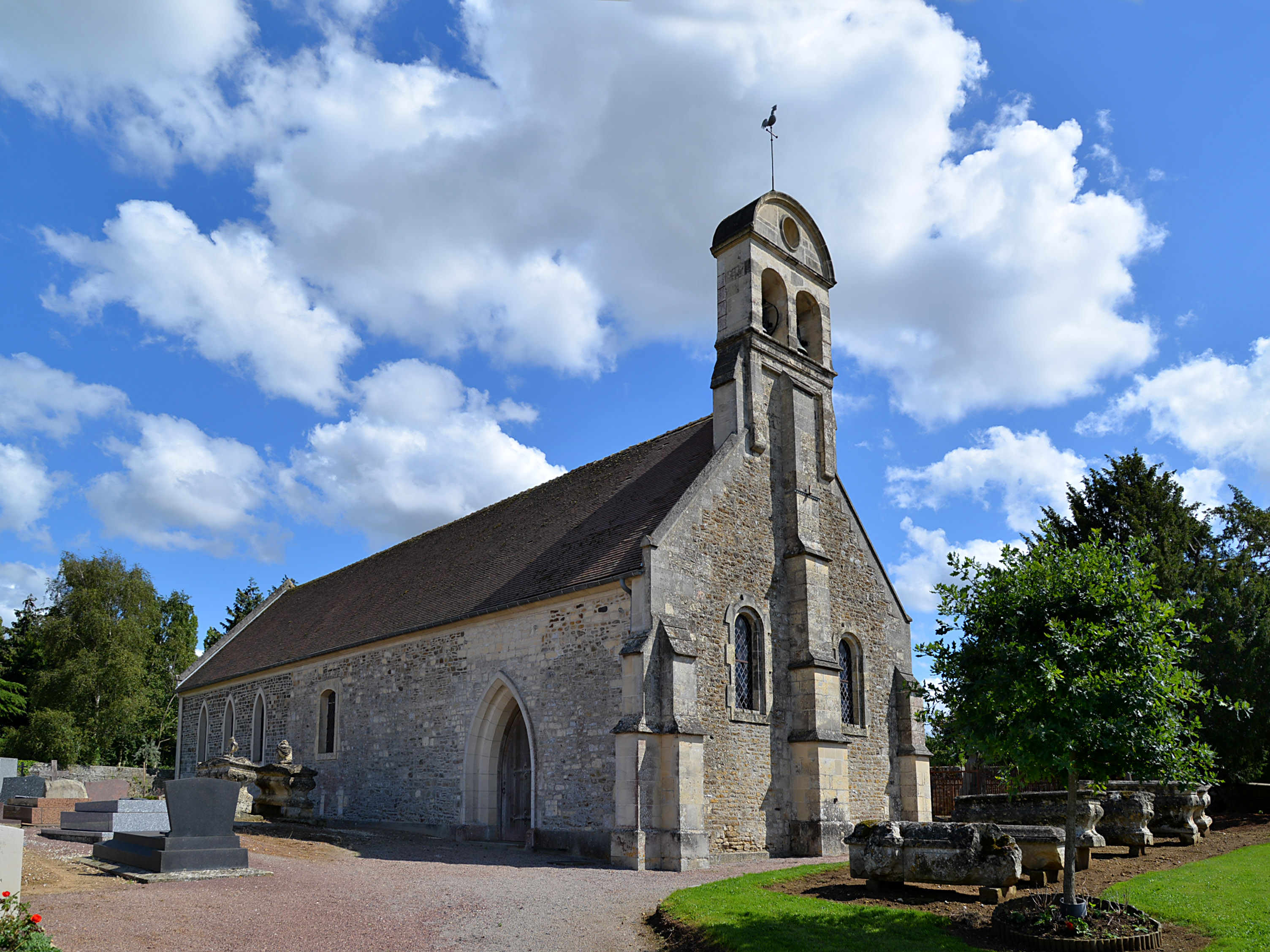
- The church in Gavrus
- Location of Gavrus
- Location within France Location within Normandy
- Coordinates: 49°07′09″N 0°30′50″W
- Country: France
- Region: Normandy
- Department: Calvados
- Arrondissement: Caen
- Canton: Évrecy

Government
  - Mayor (2020–2026): Jérôme Lebouteiller
- Area^{1}: 2.71 km^{2} (1.05 sq mi)
- Elevation: 100 m (330 ft)
- Highest elevation: 114 m (374 ft)
- Lowest elevation: 45 m (148 ft)
- Population (2023): 635
  - Density: 234/km^{2} (607/sq mi)
- Time zone: UTC+01:00 (CET)
  - Summer (DST): UTC+02:00 (CEST)
- INSEE/Postal code: 14297 /14210
- ^{1} French Land Register data, which excludes lakes, ponds, glaciers > 1 km^{2} (0.386 sq mi or 247 acres) and river estuaries.

Gavrus (French pronunciation: [ɡaˈvʁy]) is a commune in the Calvados department in the Normandy region in northwestern France.

== Geography ==
The river Odon is the only watercourse which flows through the commune.

== Population ==
Historical population
| Year | Pop. | ±% p.a. |
|---|---|---|
| 1968 | 111 | — |
| 1975 | 127 | +1.94% |
| 1982 | 161 | +3.45% |
| 1990 | 196 | +2.49% |
| 1999 | 218 | +1.19% |
| 2007 | 442 | +9.24% |
| 2012 | 544 | +4.24% |
| 2017 | 555 | +0.40% |
| 2023 | 635 | +2.27% |
Source: INSEE

== Twin towns – sister cities ==
Gavrus, along with Bougy, Évrecy, Baron-sur-Odon & Éterville is twinned with:

- Gaukönigshofen, Germany

== See also ==
- Gavros (disambiguation)
- Operation Epsom
- Communes of the Calvados department
