= Évrecy =

- Commune
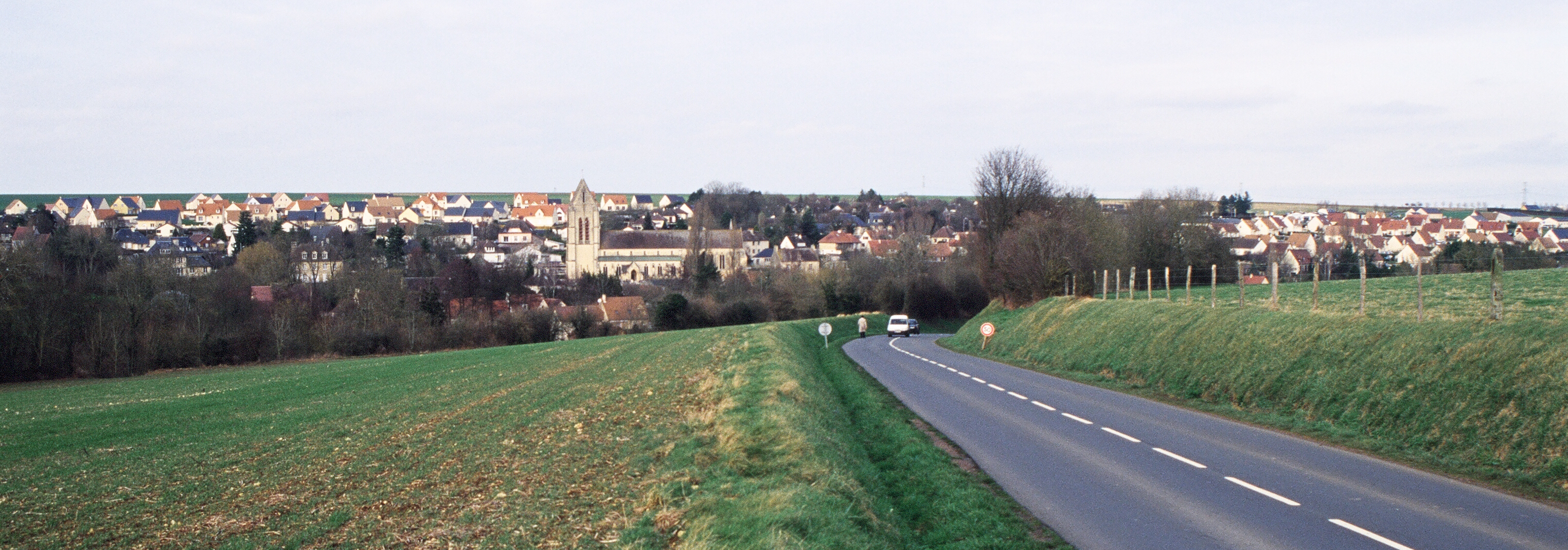
- A general view of Évrecy

- Coat of arms
- Location of Évrecy
- Location within France Location within Normandy
- Coordinates: 49°06′02″N 0°30′07″W
- Country: France
- Region: Normandy
- Department: Calvados
- Arrondissement: Caen
- Canton: Évrecy

Government
  - Mayor (2020–2026): Henri Girard
- Area^{1}: 8.31 km^{2} (3.21 sq mi)
- Elevation: 110 m (360 ft)
- Highest elevation: 122 m (400 ft)
- Lowest elevation: 58 m (190 ft)
- Population (2023): 2,066
  - Density: 249/km^{2} (644/sq mi)
- Time zone: UTC+01:00 (CET)
  - Summer (DST): UTC+02:00 (CEST)
- INSEE/Postal code: 14257 /14210
- ^{1} French Land Register data, which excludes lakes, ponds, glaciers > 1 km^{2} (0.386 sq mi or 247 acres) and river estuaries.

Évrecy (French pronunciation: [evʁəsi]) is a commune in the Calvados department in the Normandy region in northwestern France situated on the River Guigne.

== History ==
=== World war 2 ===
The commune was almost entirely destroyed on June 15, 1944, by 223 Royal Air Force Lancaster and 100 Halifax heavy bombers, with 14 Mosquito light bombers. At Évrecy the headquarters of the Wehrmacht’s Twelfth Panzer Division was destroyed, and 130 out of 430 civilians were killed, the highest proportion in any community during the Battle of Normandy.

== Geography ==
The river La Guigne and the stream Ruisseau de Verdun are the only watercourses which flow through the commune.

== Population ==
Historical population
Year	Pop.	±% p.a.
1968	619	—
1975	828	+4.24%
1982	1,099	+4.13%
1990	1,093	−0.07%
1999	1,263	+1.62%
2007	1,525	+2.38%
2012	1,824	+3.65%
2017	2,008	+1.94%
2023	2,066	+0.48%
Source: INSEE

== Points of interest ==
=== National heritage sites ===
- Église Notre-Dame a thirteenth century church listed as a Monument historique in 1927.

== Twin towns – sister cities ==
Évrecy, along with Bougy, Éterville, Baron-sur-Odon & Gavrus is twinned with:

- Gaukönigshofen, Germany

== See also ==
- Communes of the Calvados department
