= Odon (river) =

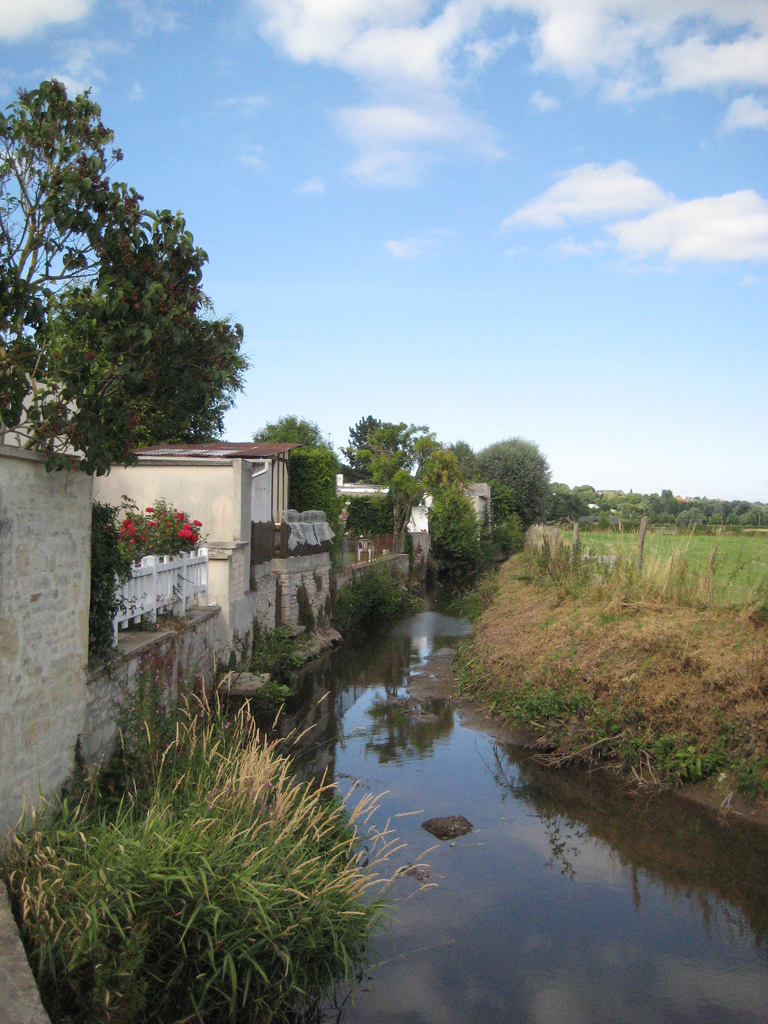

- Location within France Location within Normandy

Location
- Country: France

Physical characteristics
- Mouth
  - location: Orne
  - coordinates: 49°9′41″N 0°22′13″W
- Length: 47 km (29 mi)

Basin features
- Progression: Orne→ English Channel

The Odon (French pronunciation: [ɔdɔ̃]) is a river in the Calvados department, in Normandy, northwestern France. It is 47 km long and is a tributary of the Orne.

The rivers source is in the commune of Les Monts d'Aunay and eventually flows into the Orne in Caen. In addition to these two communes the river flows through the following twenty communes:

1. Baron-sur-Odon
2. Bougy
3. Bretteville-sur-Odon
4. Dialan sur Chaîne
5. Épinay-sur-Odon
6. Éterville
7. Fleury-sur-Orne
8. Fontaine-Étoupefour
9. Gavrus
10. Grainville-sur-Odon
11. Longvillers
12. Louvigny
13. Le Mesnil-au-Grain
14. Mondrainville
15. Mouen
16. Parfouru-sur-Odon
17. Seulline
18. Tourville-sur-Odon
19. Val d'Arry
20. Verson
