= Baron-sur-Odon =

- Commune
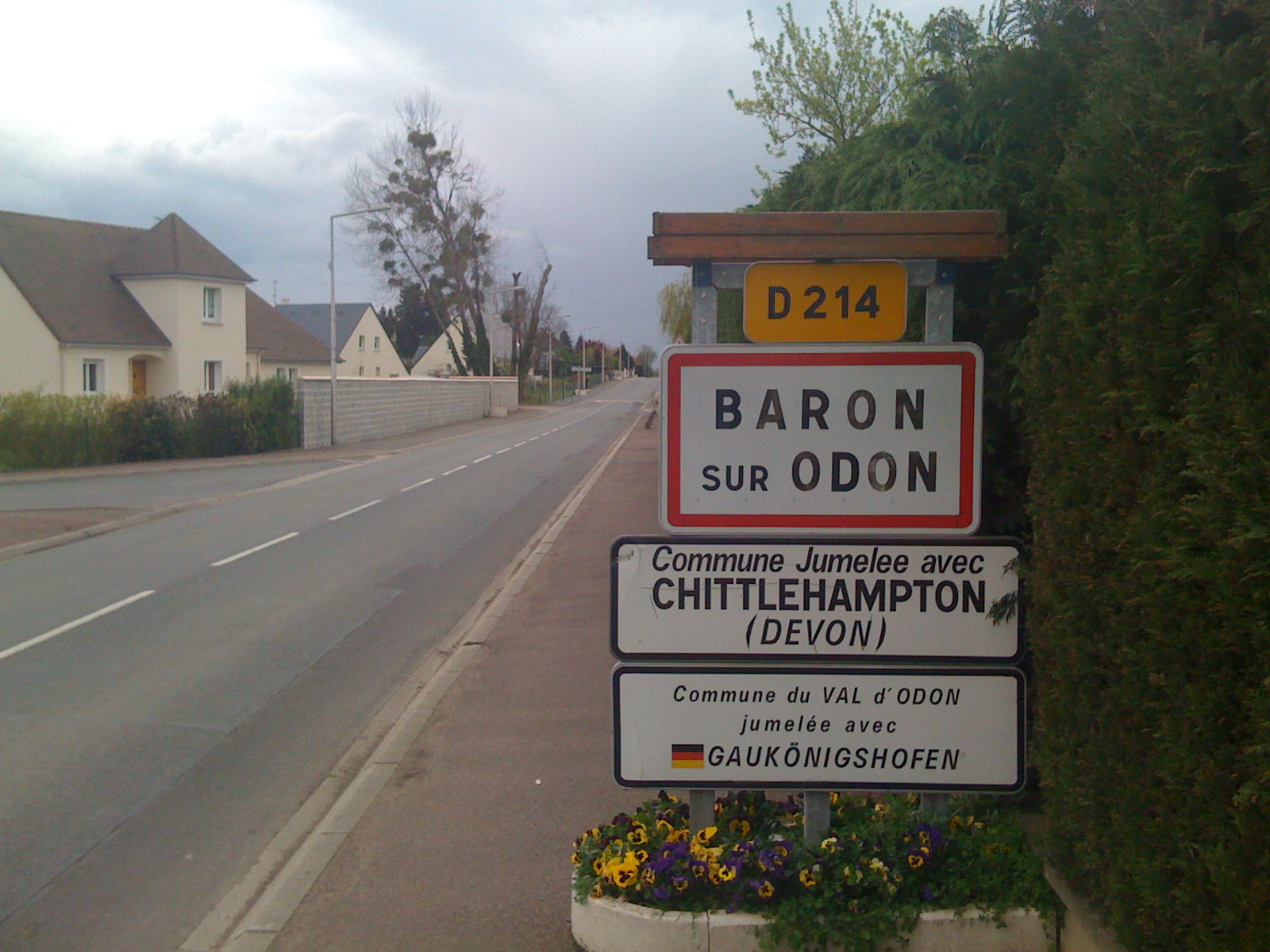
- The road into Baron-sur-Odon

- Coat of arms
- Location of Baron-sur-Odon
- Location within France Location within Normandy
- Coordinates: 49°07′43″N 0°28′57″W
- Country: France
- Region: Normandy
- Department: Calvados
- Arrondissement: Caen
- Canton: Évrecy
- Intercommunality: Vallées de l'Orne et de l'Odon

Government
  - Mayor (2020–2026): Georges Laignel
- Area^{1}: 6.43 km^{2} (2.48 sq mi)
- Elevation: 84 m (276 ft)
- Highest elevation: 112 m (367 ft)
- Lowest elevation: 25 m (82 ft)
- Population (2023): 1,154
  - Density: 179/km^{2} (465/sq mi)
- Time zone: UTC+01:00 (CET)
  - Summer (DST): UTC+02:00 (CEST)
- INSEE/Postal code: 14042 /14210
- ^{1} French Land Register data, which excludes lakes, ponds, glaciers > 1 km^{2} (0.386 sq mi or 247 acres) and river estuaries.

Baron-sur-Odon (French pronunciation: [baʁɔ̃ syʁ ɔdɔ̃]) is a commune in the Calvados department in the Normandy region of north-western France.

The inhabitants of the commune are known as Baronnais or Baronnaises.

The commune has been awarded one flower by the National Council of Towns and Villages in Bloom in the Competition of cities and villages in Bloom.

== Geography ==
Baron-sur-Odon is located some 4 km south-west of Caen and 10 km north-east of Villers-Bocage. It is part of the urban area of Caen. Access to the commune is by the D89 from Tourville-sur-Odon in the north which passes through the village and continues south to Esquay-Notre-Dame. The D214 comes from Gavrus in the south-west and also passes through the village as well as Les Crettes and La Bruyère before continuing north-east to Fontaine-Étoupefour. Apart from the village there are the hamlets of Tourmauville, Les Crettes, and La Bruyère. The commune is mostly farmland except for some forest in the north.

The river Odon forms the northern border of the commune as it flows north-east to join the Orne in Caen.

== Toponymy ==
The name of the area is attested as Baron in 1138 and Baro in the 14th century. The origin of this place name is uncertain. Albert Dauzat suggests the cognomen Baro or a title of German origin Baron. René Lepelley meanwhile detects the Gallic barro meaning "fence" (in old French barre) or the Germanic anthroponym Baro.

== History ==
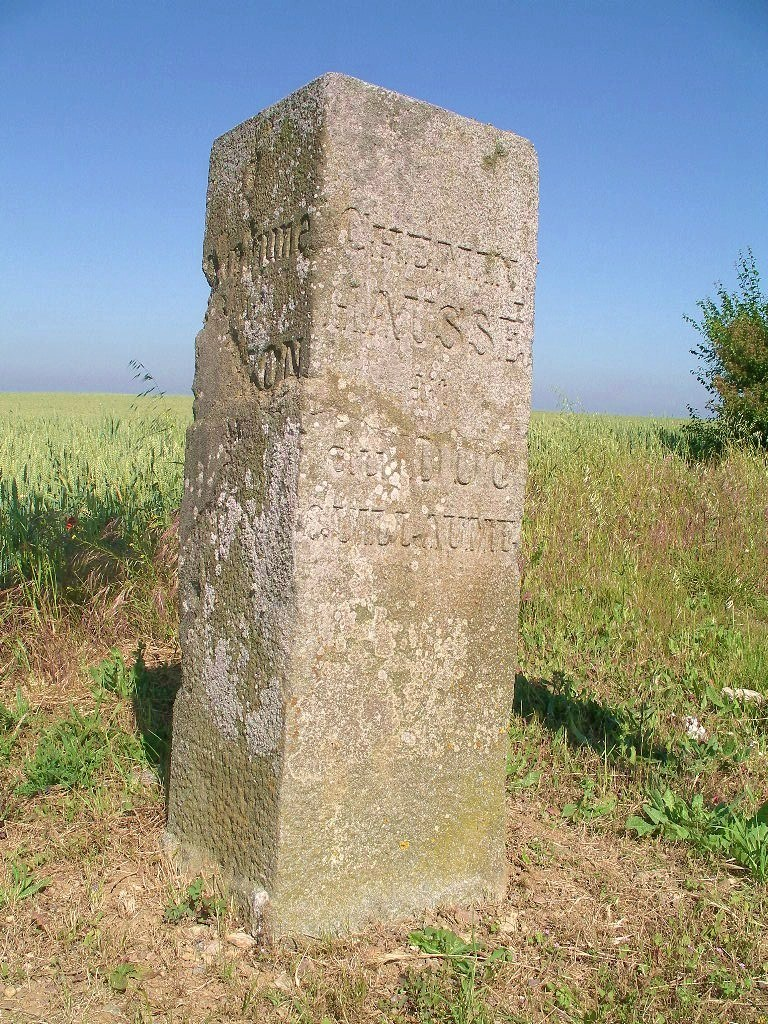
A milestone on Chemin Haussé

Baron-sur-Odon appears as Baron on the 1750 Cassini Map and the same on the 1790 version.

The "Chemin Haussé", which passes through the commune, is a Roman road identified as one of the roads included in the Tabula Peutingeriana. The road is mostly straight with embankments hence the name (Haussé means "raised"). This route was used as a line of communication until the end of the Middle Ages. It is also called the "Path of Duke William" on some land registers.

In June 1944, during Operation Epsom, the heights of Hill 112 south-east of Baron-sur-Odon (also in the communes of Fontaine-Étoupefour, Vieux, and Esquay-Notre-Dame) was one objectives for the liberation of Caen. The fighting lasted more than a month.

=== Heraldry ===
Arms of Baron-sur-Odon	Blazon: Party per bend sinister, at 1 Gules, two lions passant guardant Or one over the other to sinister and a croix de guerre in chief border; at 2, Azure semy of wavelets Argent debruised by a horseshoe inverted Or; over all a bend sinister charged with the inscription BARON in capital letters of Sable .

The explanation of this blazon follows:

- The Croix de Guerre was awarded to the commune after the Battle of Hill 112 which took place on its soil.
- The arms of the Basse-Normandie region are represented by two golden leopards.

The horseshoe symbolizes the escape of William the Conqueror (from Valognes to Falaise in 1047) with his horse shod in reverse to mislead his pursuers. The ripples represent the river Odon.

== Administration ==
List of Successive Mayors

From	To	Name	Party	Position
1971	1983	Charles Duboscq		
1983	1995	Gérard Maheut		
1995	2008	Joseph Desquesnes		
2008	2026	Georges Laignel		

The municipal council consists of 15 members including a Mayor and four deputies.

=== Twinning ===
Baron-sur-Odon has twinning associations with:

- Gaukönigshofen (Germany) since 1998.
- Chittlehampton (United Kingdom) since 1986.

== Demography ==
Historical population

Year	Pop.	±% p.a.
1793	450	—
1821	456	+0.05%
1846	467	+0.10%
1872	379	−0.80%
1901	318	−0.60%
1926	193	−1.98%
1936	216	+1.13%
1946	195	−1.02%
1954	228	+1.97%
1962	267	+1.99%

Year	Pop.	±% p.a.
1968	313	+2.68%
1975	446	+5.19%
1982	579	+3.80%
1990	616	+0.78%
1999	625	+0.16%
2007	839	+3.75%
2012	840	+0.02%
2017	939	+2.25%
2023	1,154	+3.50%

Source: EHESS and INSEE

== Culture and heritage ==
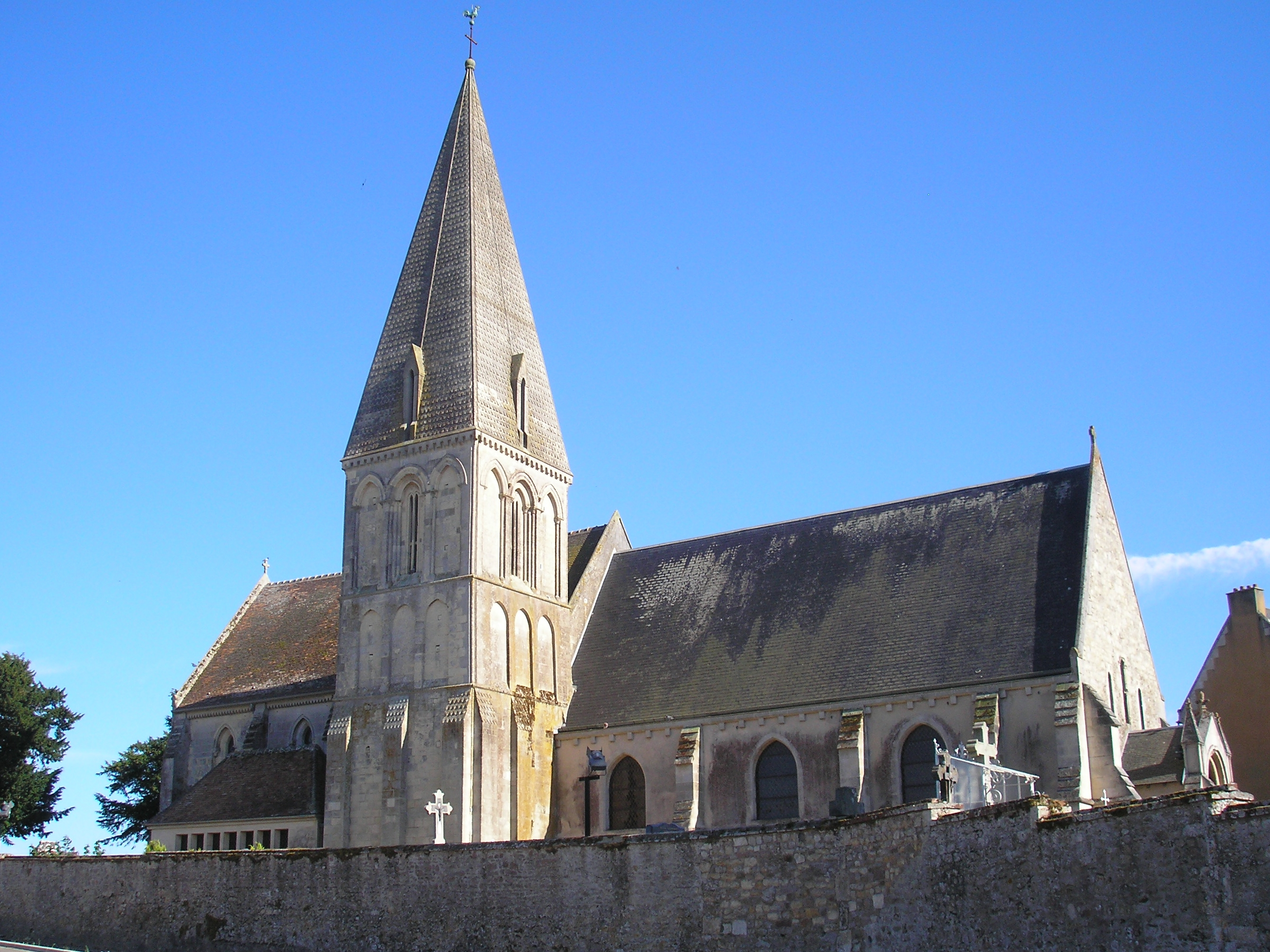
The Church of Notre-Dame of the Nativity

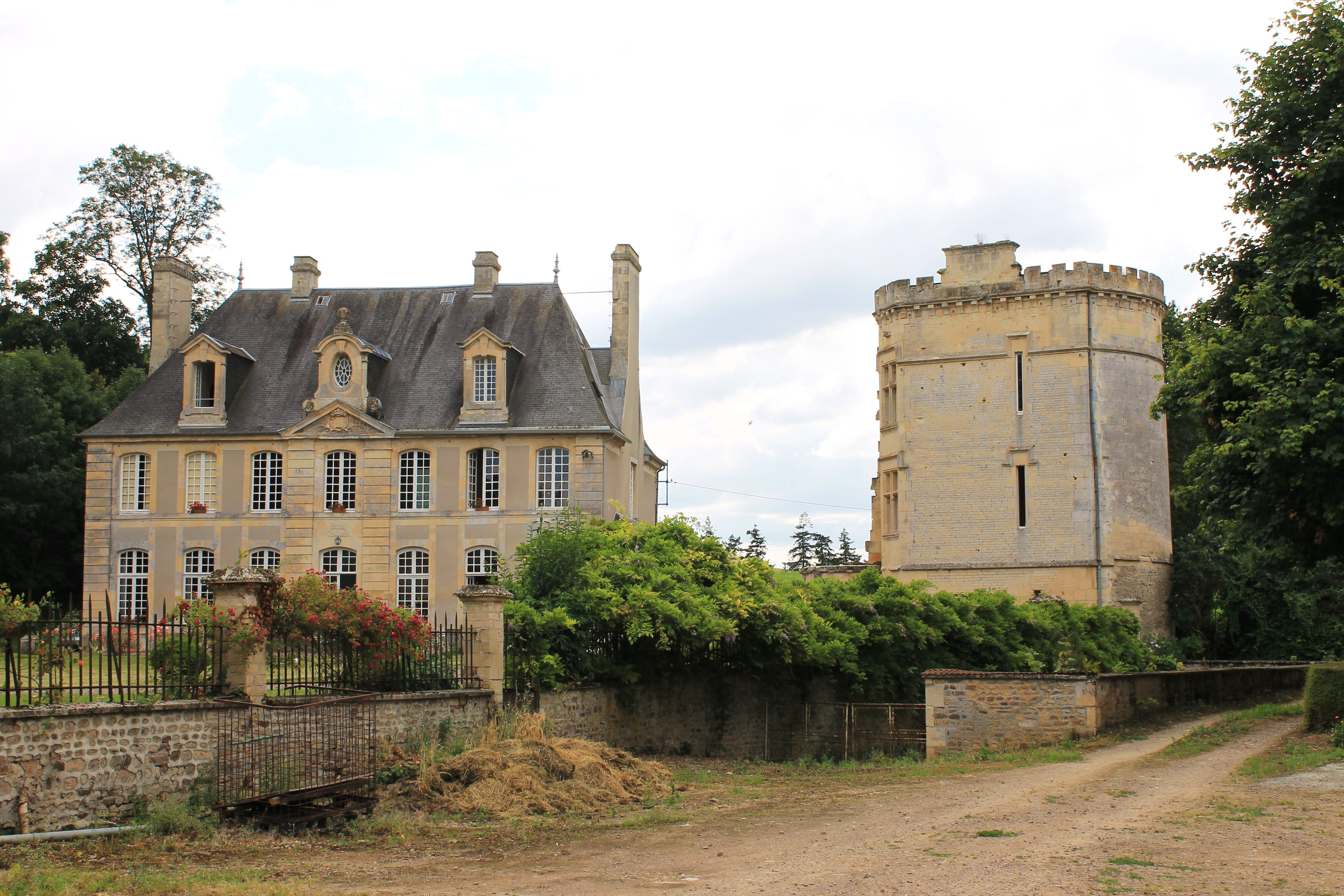
The Manor and the Tower

=== Civil heritage ===
- The Chateau of Tourmeauville (18th century) with its Chapel (19th century)
- A Chateau and Manor (16th century) is registered as a Monument historique

=== Religious heritage ===
The Church of Notre-Dame of the Nativity (12th century) is registered as a Monument historique.

== See also ==
- Communes of the Calvados department
- Operation Epsom
