= Trois-Monts =

- Part of Montillières-sur-Orne
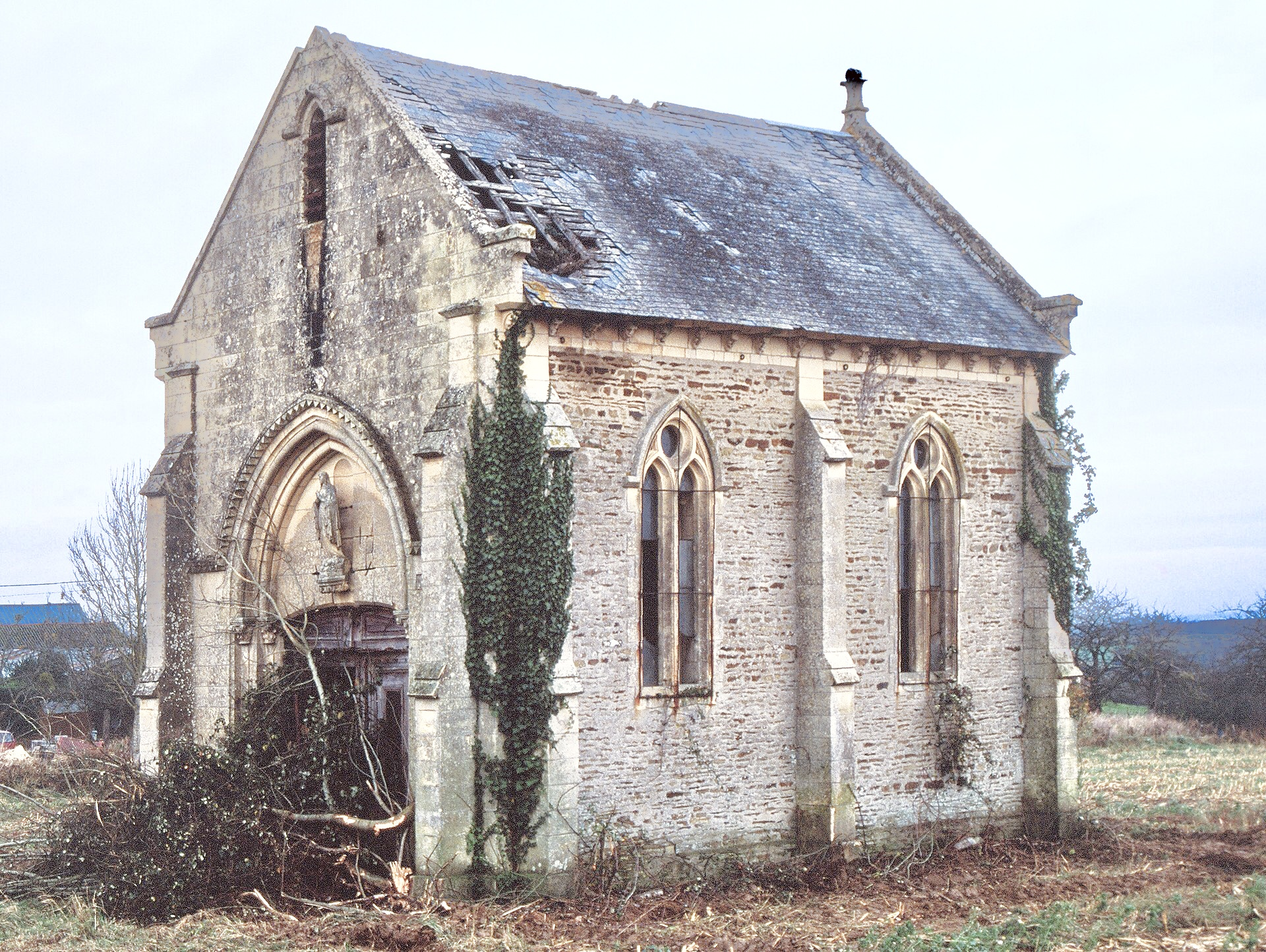
- The chapel in Trois-Monts
- Location of Trois-Monts
- Location within France Location within Normandy
- Coordinates: 49°02′52″N 0°28′44″W
- Country: France
- Region: Normandy
- Department: Calvados
- Arrondissement: Caen
- Canton: Le Hom
- Commune: Montillières-sur-Orne
- Area^{1}: 7.04 km^{2} (2.72 sq mi)
- Elevation: 100 m (330 ft)
- Highest elevation: 159 m (522 ft)
- Lowest elevation: 12 m (39 ft)
- Population (2016): 427
  - Density: 60.7/km^{2} (157/sq mi)
- Time zone: UTC+01:00 (CET)
  - Summer (DST): UTC+02:00 (CEST)
- Postal code: 14210
- ^{1} French Land Register data, which excludes lakes, ponds, glaciers > 1 km^{2} (0.386 sq mi or 247 acres) and river estuaries.

Trois-Monts (pronounced [tʁwɑ mɔ̃]; French for 'three-mountains') is a former commune in the Calvados department in the Normandy region in northwestern France. On 1 January 2019, it was merged into the new commune Montillières-sur-Orne.

The former commune is part of the area known as Suisse Normande.

== Twin towns – sister cities ==
Trois-Monts, along with eight other communes, Amayé-sur-Orne, Maizet, Montigny, Préaux-Bocage, Maisoncelles-sur-Ajon, Sainte-Honorine-du-Fay, Vacognes-Neuilly and Avenay, is a member of The ICL Val Orne, which has organised being twinned with:

- (Germany) Johannesberg, Bavaria.

== See also ==
- Communes of the Calvados department
