= La Caine =

- Commune
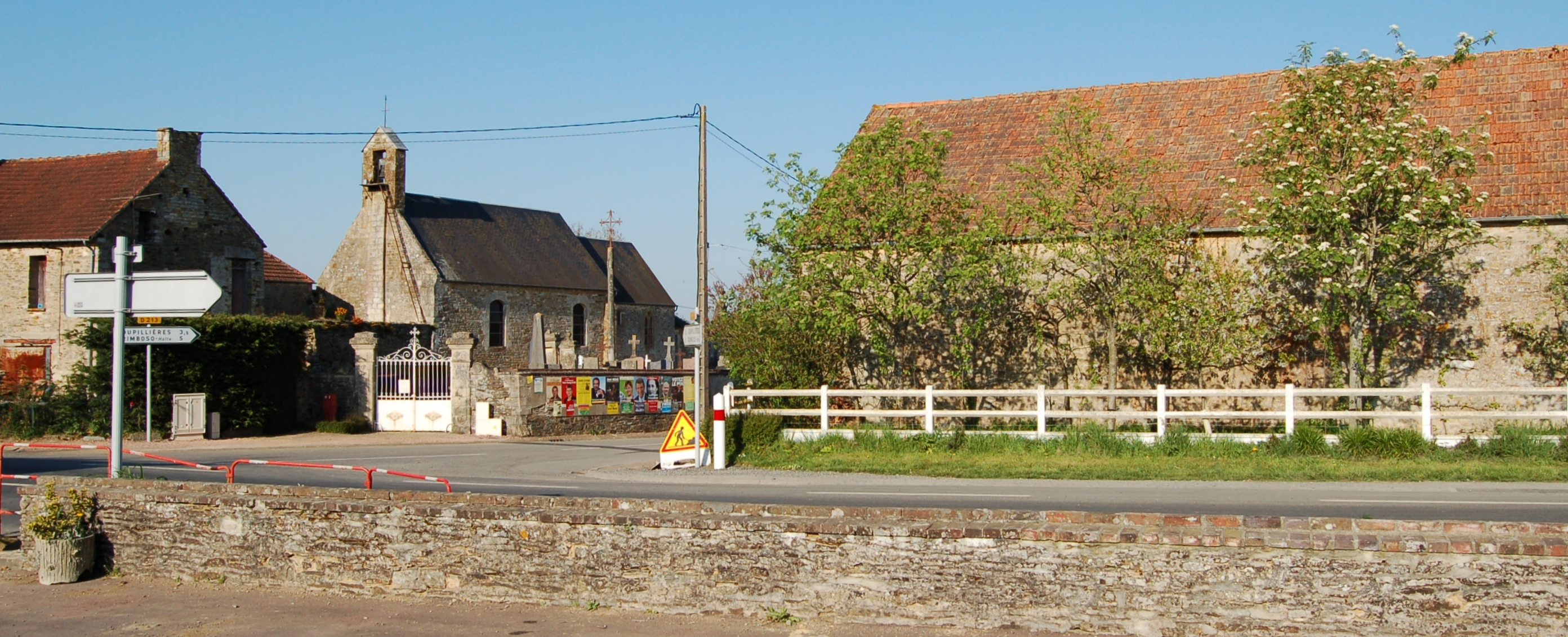
- The crossroads of La Caine
- Location of La Caine
- Location within France Location within Normandy
- Coordinates: 49°02′07″N 0°31′08″W
- Country: France
- Region: Normandy
- Department: Calvados
- Arrondissement: Caen
- Canton: Évrecy

Government
  - Mayor (2020–2026): Yannick Leguiriec
- Area^{1}: 2.41 km^{2} (0.93 sq mi)
- Elevation: 176 m (577 ft)
- Highest elevation: 193 m (633 ft)
- Lowest elevation: 114 m (374 ft)
- Population (2023): 159
  - Density: 66.0/km^{2} (171/sq mi)
- Time zone: UTC+01:00 (CET)
  - Summer (DST): UTC+02:00 (CEST)
- INSEE/Postal code: 14122 /14210
- ^{1} French Land Register data, which excludes lakes, ponds, glaciers > 1 km^{2} (0.386 sq mi or 247 acres) and river estuaries.

La Caine (French pronunciation: [la kɛn]) is a commune in the Calvados department in the Normandy region in north-western France.

== History ==
A nunnery was founded at La Caine, probably in 1066.

=== World War II ===
Following the Allied Normandy Landings, the headquarters of Panzer Group West was established in the Chateau at La Caine. The headquarters' new location was revealed to the British intelligence by Ultra's deciphering of German signals traffic. On 10 June 1944, aircraft of the RAF's Second Tactical Air Force bombed the village killing the German chief of staff and many other personnel. German communications equipment and vehicles were also destroyed.HyperWar: The US Army Air Forces in WWII: D-Day 1944

== Geography ==
La Caine is about 12 miles southwest of Caen. The municipality is adjacent to Préaux-Bocage in the north, Montillières-sur-Orne in the northeast and east, Ouffières in the southeast, Thury-Harcourt-le-Hom in the south and Montigny in the west.

The commune is on the border of the area known as Suisse Normande.

Two water courses flow through the commune the River Ajon and a stream the Ruisseau de Flagy.

== Demographics ==
Historical population
Year	Pop.	±% p.a.
1968	65	—
1975	81	+3.19%
1982	60	−4.20%
1990	97	+6.19%
1999	93	−0.47%
2007	97	+0.53%
2012	122	+4.69%
2017	158	+5.31%
2023	159	+0.11%
Source: INSEE

== Religion ==
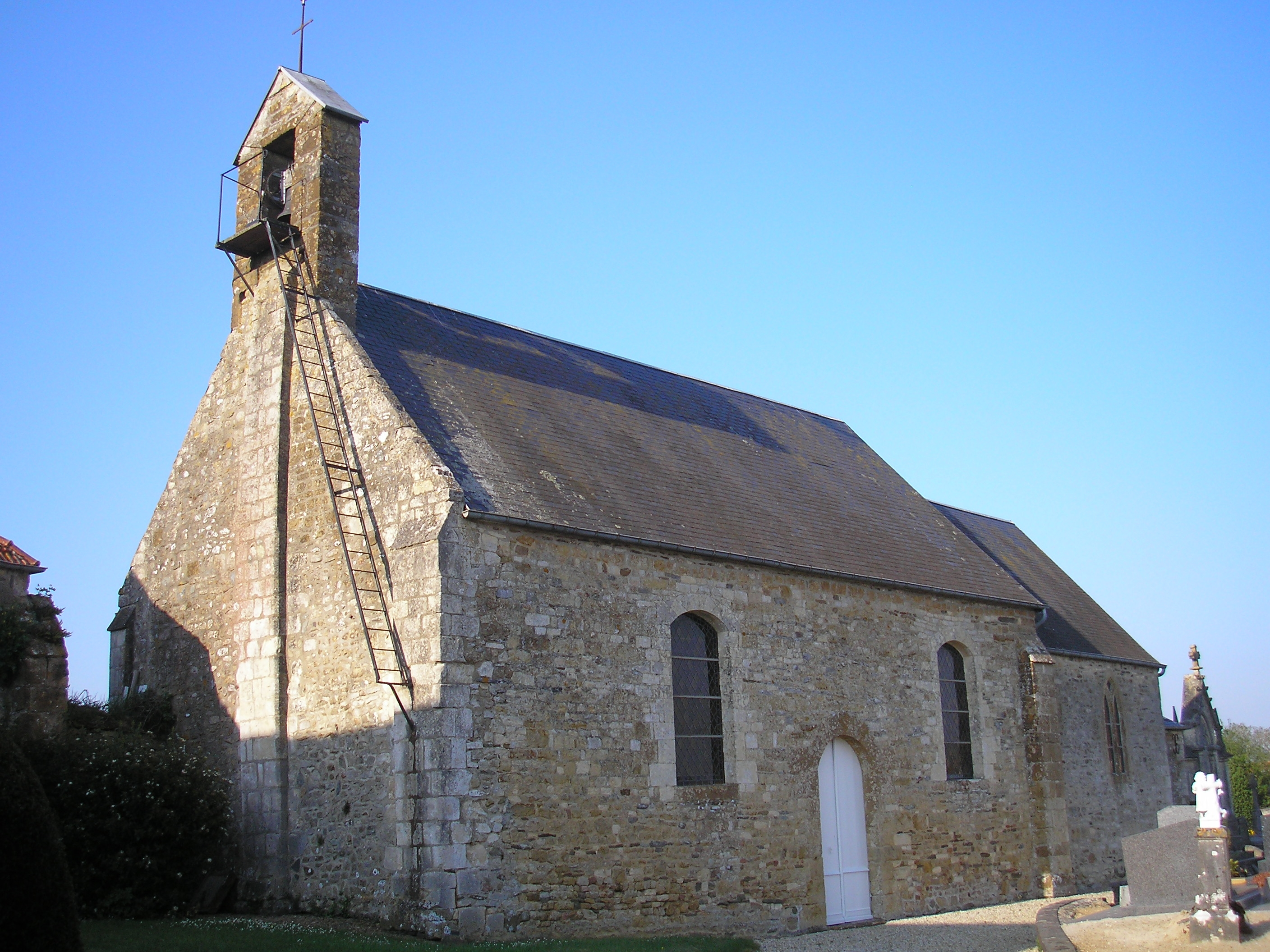
The Notre Dame church in the centre of La Caine.

La Caine has a small Roman Catholic church, the L'église Notre-Dame.

== See also ==
- Communes of the Calvados department
