= Laize-la-Ville =

- Part of Laize-Clinchamps
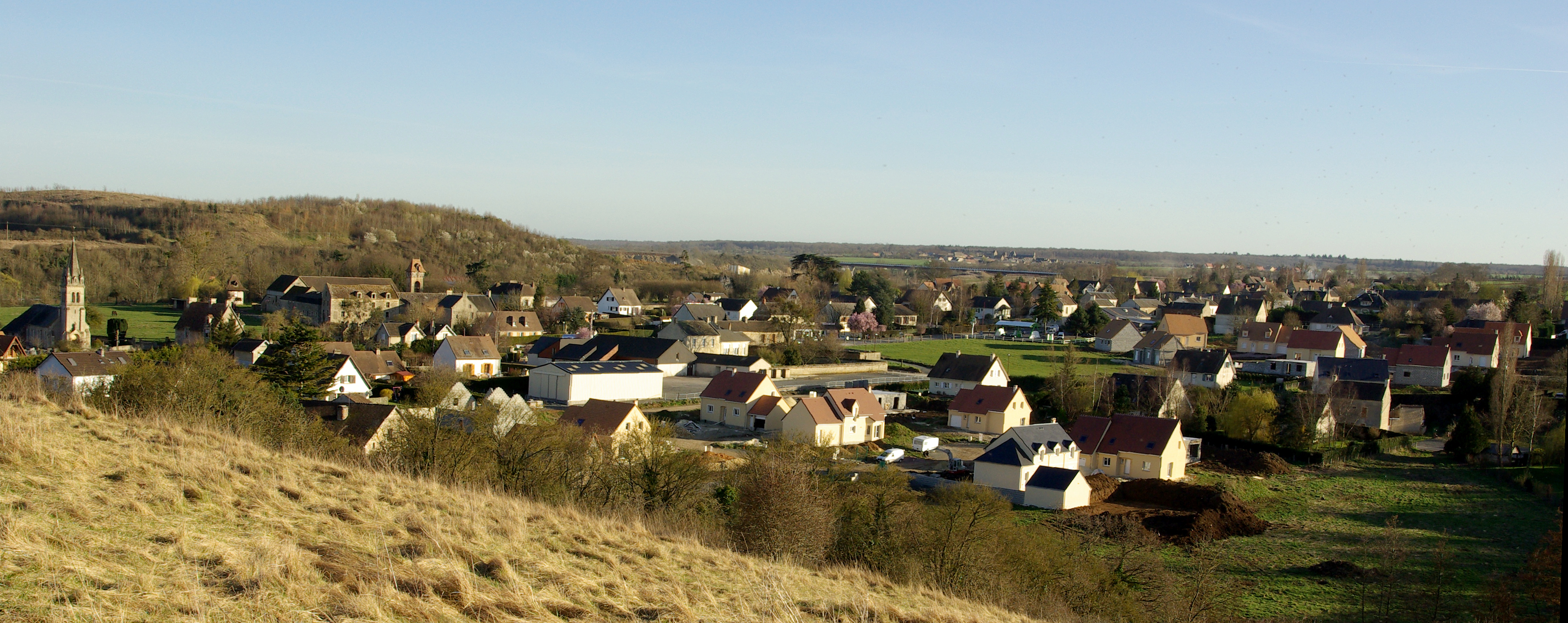
- Location of Laize-la-Ville
- Location within France Location within Normandy
- Coordinates: 49°04′59″N 0°22′48″W
- Country: France
- Region: Normandy
- Department: Calvados
- Arrondissement: Caen
- Canton: Évrecy
- Commune: Laize-Clinchamps
- Area^{1}: 1.76 km^{2} (0.68 sq mi)
- Elevation: 60 m (200 ft)
- Highest elevation: 74 m (243 ft)
- Lowest elevation: 15 m (49 ft)
- Population (2023): 803
  - Density: 456/km^{2} (1,180/sq mi)
- Time zone: UTC+01:00 (CET)
  - Summer (DST): UTC+02:00 (CEST)
- Postal code: 14320
- ^{1} French Land Register data, which excludes lakes, ponds, glaciers > 1 km^{2} (0.386 sq mi or 247 acres) and river estuaries.

Laize-la-Ville (French pronunciation: [lɛz la vil]) is a former commune in the Calvados department in the Normandy region in northwestern France. On 1 January 2017, it was merged into the new commune Laize-Clinchamps.

== See also ==
- Communes of the Calvados department
