= Goupillières =

Goupillières is the name of several communes in France:

- Goupillières, Calvados, in the Calvados département
- Goupillières, Eure, in the Eure département
- Goupillières, Seine-Maritime, in the Seine-Maritime département
- Goupillières, Yvelines, in the Yvelines département
