= Laize-Clinchamps =

- Commune
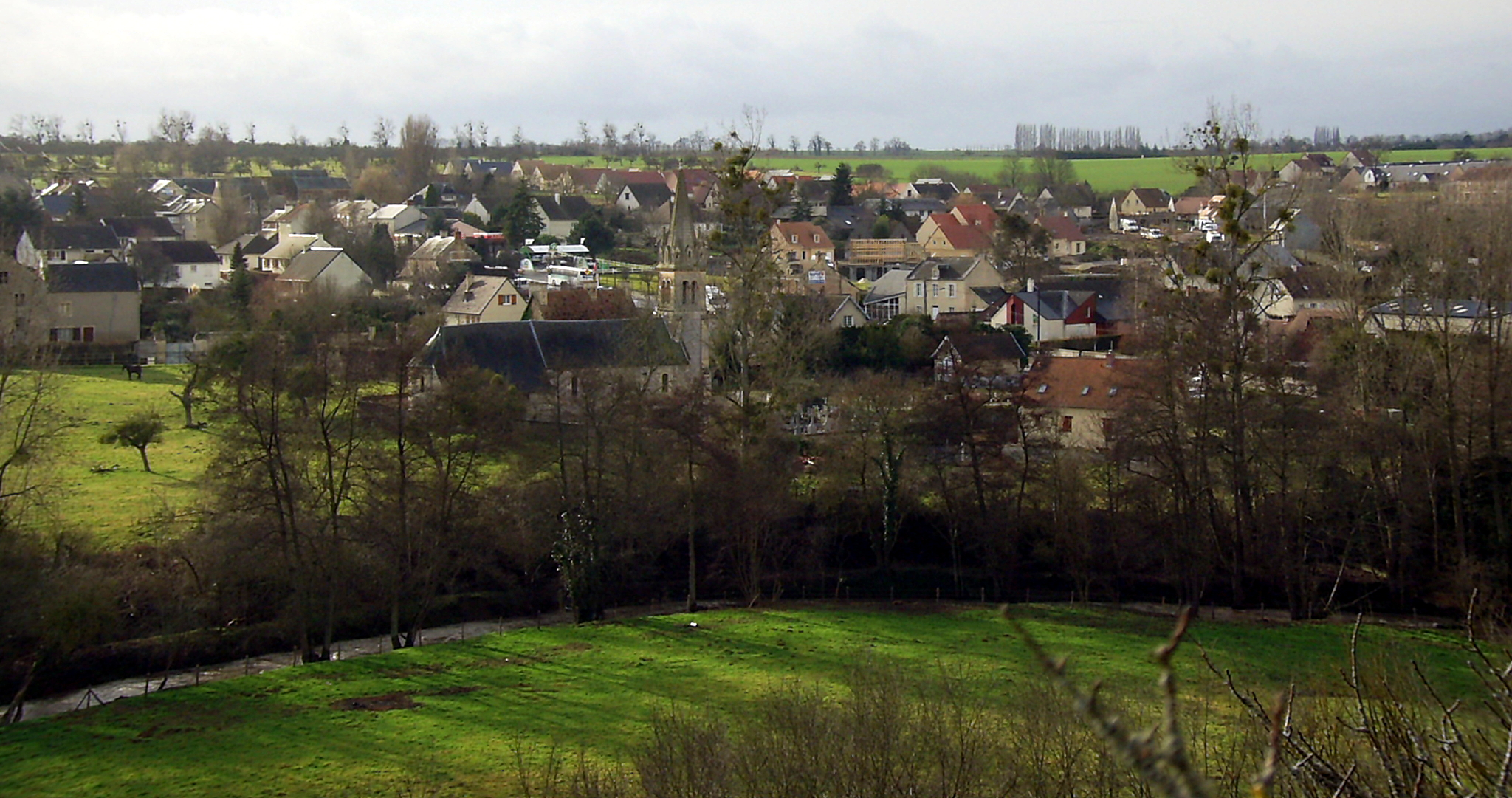
- A partial view of the village of Laize-la-Ville
- Location of Laize-Clinchamps
- Location within France Location within Normandy
- Coordinates: 49°04′55″N 0°22′52″W
- Country: France
- Region: Normandy
- Department: Calvados
- Arrondissement: Caen
- Canton: Évrecy
- Intercommunality: Vallées de l'Orne et de l'Odon

Government
  - Mayor (2020–2026): Dominique Rose
- Area^{1}: 8.13 km^{2} (3.14 sq mi)
- Population (2023): 2,155
  - Density: 265/km^{2} (687/sq mi)
- Time zone: UTC+01:00 (CET)
  - Summer (DST): UTC+02:00 (CEST)
- INSEE/Postal code: 14349 /14320
- ^{1} French Land Register data, which excludes lakes, ponds, glaciers > 1 km^{2} (0.386 sq mi or 247 acres) and river estuaries.

Laize-Clinchamps (French pronunciation: [lɛz klɛ̃ʃɑ̃]) is a commune in the department of Calvados, northwestern France. The municipality was established on 1 January 2017 by merger of the former communes of Laize-la-Ville (the seat) and Clinchamps-sur-Orne.

== Geography ==
The commune is made up of the following collection of villages and hamlets, Percouville, Laize-la-Ville, Clinchamps-sur-Orne and Les Jardins.

Two rivers the Orne and one of its tributaries the Laize a flow through the commune. in addition a stream, the Ruisseau du Val Distrait flows through the commune.

== Population ==
Population data refer to the commune in its geography as of January 2025.

Historical population
Year	Pop.	±% p.a.
1968	722	—
1975	726	+0.08%
1982	862	+2.48%
1990	1,151	+3.68%
1999	1,288	+1.26%
2007	1,481	+1.76%
2012	1,753	+3.43%
2017	2,017	+2.85%
2023	2,155	+1.11%
Source: INSEE

== Points of Interest ==
=== National Heritage sites ===
- Eglise Notre-Dame twelfth century church listed as a Monument historique in 1932.

== See also ==
- Communes of the Calvados department
