= Johannesberg, Bavaria =

Johannesberg
- Municipality
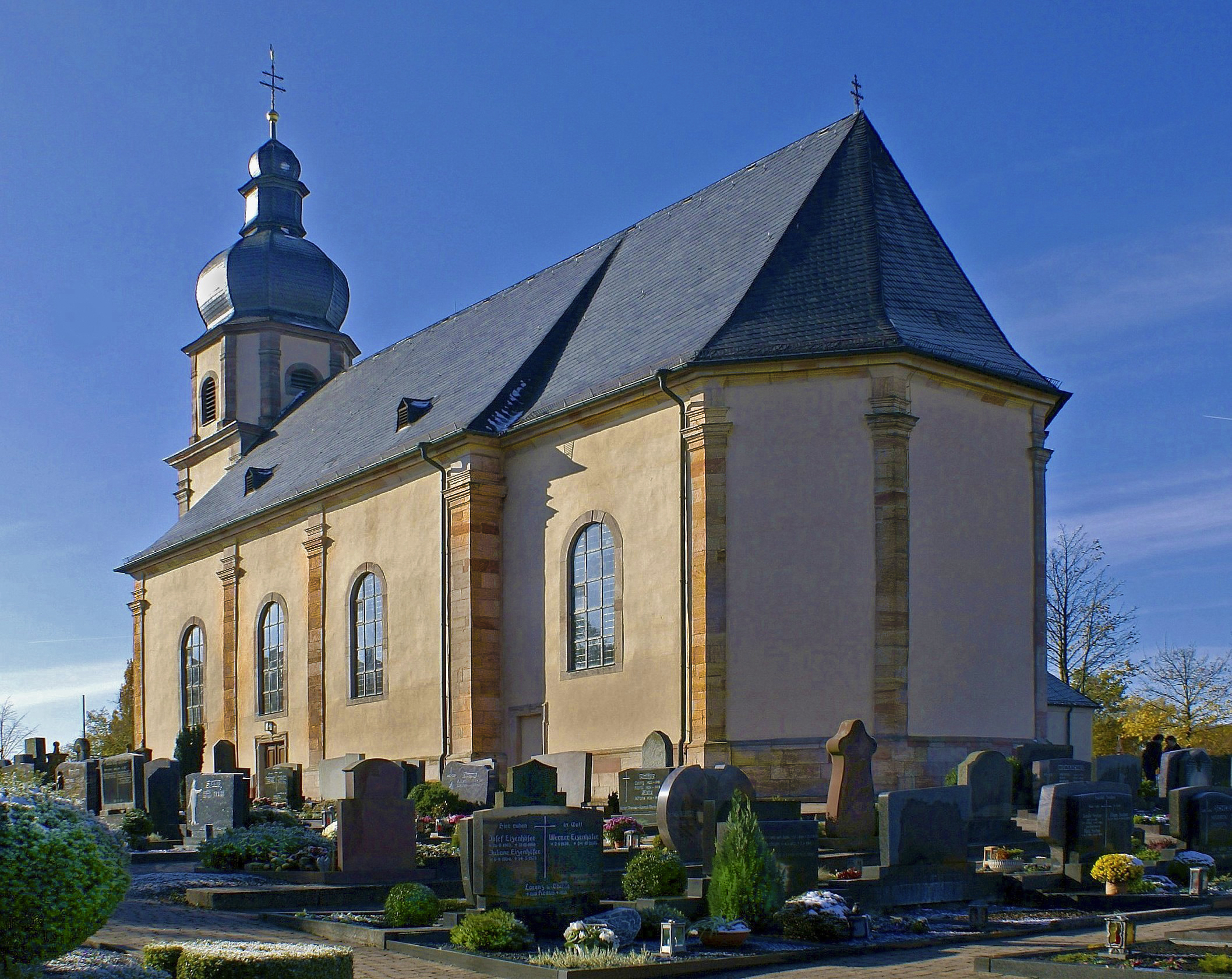
- Church of Saint John the Baptist

- Coat of arms

- Location of Johannesberg within Aschaffenburg district
- Interactive map of Johannesberg
- Location within Germany Location within Bavaria
- Coordinates: 50°02′N 09°08′E
- Country: Germany
- State: Bavaria
- Admin. region: Unterfranken
- District: Aschaffenburg
- Subdivisions: 5 Ortsteile

Government
  - Mayor (2020–26): Peter Zenglein (CSU)

Area
  - Total: 13.63 km^{2} (5.26 sq mi)
- Elevation: 372 m (1,220 ft)

Population (2025-12-31)
  - Total: 4,075
  - Density: 299.0/km^{2} (774.3/sq mi)
- Time zone: UTC+01:00 (CET)
  - Summer (DST): UTC+02:00 (CEST)
- Postal codes: 63867
- Dialling codes: 06021
- Vehicle registration: AB
- Website: www.johannesberg.de

Johannesberg is a municipality in the Aschaffenburg district in the Regierungsbezirk of Lower Franconia (Unterfranken) in Bavaria, Germany. As of 2023, Johannesberg had a population of 3,994.

== Geography ==
=== Location ===
Gemeindeteile

Johannesberg lies in the Bavarian Lower Main (Bayerischer Untermain), 10 km from Aschaffenburg. The Church of Saint John's Beheading (Kirche St. Johannes Enthauptung) stands on the peak of the Johannesberg – the municipality's namesake – 367 m above sea level.

=== Gemeindeteile ===
Johannesberg's Gemeindeteile are Breunsberg, Johannesberg, Oberafferbach, Rückersbach and Steinbach. Furthermore, three hamlets are to be found in Johannesberg: Rauenthaler Hof, Sternberg and Hagelhof.

== History ==
The first church on the Johannesberg was likely built between 1200 and 1300, in the Romanesque style. As a high church it was built outside the municipality of Oberafferbach. In 1351, Rauenthal had its first documentary mention. The Aschaffenburg Monastery was enfeoffed with the Geipelshof (estate) near Johannesberg in 1440.

The old parish house had its first documentary mention in 1550. With Count Philipp von Rieneck's death in 1559, the noble family died out and the Bishops of Mainz took over power in the Spessart (range) for good. The Electorate of Mainz declared in 1682 that all children between the ages of 6 and 12 were obligated to attend school.

In the course of the War of the Austrian Succession, British troops destroyed the church in Johannesberg in 1743. From early 1768 it was rebuilt and expanded. It was completed about 1774.

In 1945, U.S. troops occupied Oberafferbach and Johannesberg, as well as Mainaschaff, Laufach and Goldbach.

In the first, voluntary phase of municipal reform, the formerly self-administering municipalities of Breunsberg, Johannesberg, Oberafferbach and Rückersbach merged into a new entity with the name Johannesberg. In 1976, the municipalities of Johannesberg and Glattbach together formed the Verwaltungsgemeinschaft (municipal association) of Rauenthal. In accordance with the Lower Franconian government's decision, the outlying centre of Rauenthal – formerly an exclave – was split from the municipality of Johannesberg and merged into the municipality of Glattbach instead. After the voluntary phase of municipal reform ended, the municipality of Steinbach was forcibly incorporated into Johannesberg in 1978.

Between Johannesberg and Val Orne-Ajon in the French department of Calvados, an official partnership was established in 1990 with quite a number of centres, namely Avenay, Amayé-sur-Orne, Maizet, Montigny, Préaux-Bocage, Maisoncelles-sur-Ajon, Sainte-Honorine-du-Fay, and Vacognes-Neuilly. On 18 May 1996, the French municipality of Trois-Monts joined the group as the ninth municipality.

The Verwaltungsgemeinschaft Rauenthal was dissolved by law in 1994. The municipality of Johannesberg once again has its own municipal administration.

In 2000, Johannesberg's 800-year jubilee celebration took place.

== Demographics ==
Within the municipal area lived 2,730 inhabitants in 1970, 3,391 in 1987 and 3,833 in 2000.

== Economy ==
The municipal tax revenue in 1999 amounted to €1,892,000 (converted), of which business tax revenue (net) accounted for €160,000.

According to official statistics, in 1998, there were 141 workers on the social welfare contribution rolls working in producing businesses. In trade and transport this was 135. In other areas, 1,308 workers on the social welfare contribution rolls were remote workers. Nobody is employed in processing businesses. No businesses are in construction, and furthermore, in 1999, there were 18 agricultural operations with a working area of 392 ha, of which 194 ha was cropland and 191 ha was meadowland.

== Government ==
=== Municipal council ===
The council is made up of 16 council members, not counting the mayor.

	CSU	SPD	FWG	Johannesberg aktiv e. V. (JA)	Total
2008	6 (-3)	2 (-1)	3 (-1)	5* (+5)	16 seats

(as at municipal election held on 2 March 2008; changes from 2002 election in parentheses; *JA was participating in a municipal election for the first time in 2008)

=== Mayors ===
- 1812 Peter Flittner
- 1848–1838 Fecher
- 1843 Junker
- 1859 Eisert
- 1876–1881 Stadtmüller
- 1882–1887 Denk
- 1888–1919 Conrad Fecher
- 1919–1929 Martin Stadtmüller
- 1930–1945 Anton Kraus
- 1945–1949 Ferdinand Stadtmüller
- 1948–1956 August Eisert
- 1956–1962 Anton Kraus
- 1962–1972 Alois Hain
- 1984–2008 Michael Rosner
- since 2008 Peter Zenglein

=== Coat of arms ===
The municipality's arms might be described thus: Argent a bend sinister wavy azure surmounted by a sword in bend of the second, in base a mount of three gules surmounted by a wheel spoked of six of the first.

The sword stands for the local parish church's patron, who is John the Baptist – the church itself is called Johannes Enthauptung, or “John’s Beheading”, the sword being the instrument of this deed. The reference to John also recalls the municipality's name: Johannes is a German form of the name John. For centuries the municipality was part of the Electorate of Mainz, symbolized in the arms by the Wheel of Mainz. The three-knolled hill, called a Dreiberg in German heraldry, refers to the municipality's geographical location in the Vorspessart, and also to the three Gemeindeteile of Johannesberg, Breunsberg and Sternberg, which all end in —berg (German for “mountain”), whereas the wavy bend sinister (slanted stripe), which is meant to resemble a brook, refers to the three Gemeindeteile of Oberafferbach, Steinbach and Rückersbach, which all end in —bach (German for “brook”).

The arms have been borne since 22 March 1976 after a decision by the municipality and approval from the government of Lower Franconia.

=== Town twinning ===
- Avenay, Calvados, France since 1990
- Amayé-sur-Orne, Calvados, France since 1990
- Maizet, Calvados, France since 1990
- Montigny, Calvados, France since 1990
- Préaux-Bocage, Calvados, France since 1990
- Maisoncelles-sur-Ajon, Calvados, France since 1990
- Sainte-Honorine-du-Fay, Calvados, France since 1990
- Vacognes-Neuilly, Calvados, France since 1990
- Montillières-sur-Orne, Calvados, France since 1996

All nine French municipalities mentioned above are part of a single partnership organized under the umbrella organization I.C.L. Val Orne-Ajon.

== Arts and culture ==
The Baroque Catholic parish church of Saint John's Beheading (Pfarrkirche Sankt Johannes' Enthauptung) stands on the hill above the village. Every year, the Catholic parish celebrates its patronage on 29 August, the day when the church commemorates the Passion of John the Baptist.

The Mühlbergfest is a yearly musical event which draws roughly 2,000 visitors. Past acts included bands as the Bananafishbones, ABCD, the Rodgau Monotones, Pur, Cashma Hoody, Boppin‘B or The Bones.

== Notable people ==
- Alfons Goppel (1905–1991), German politician (CSU). From 1962 to 1978 he was Premier (Ministerpräsident) of Bavaria.
