= Grentheville =

- Commune
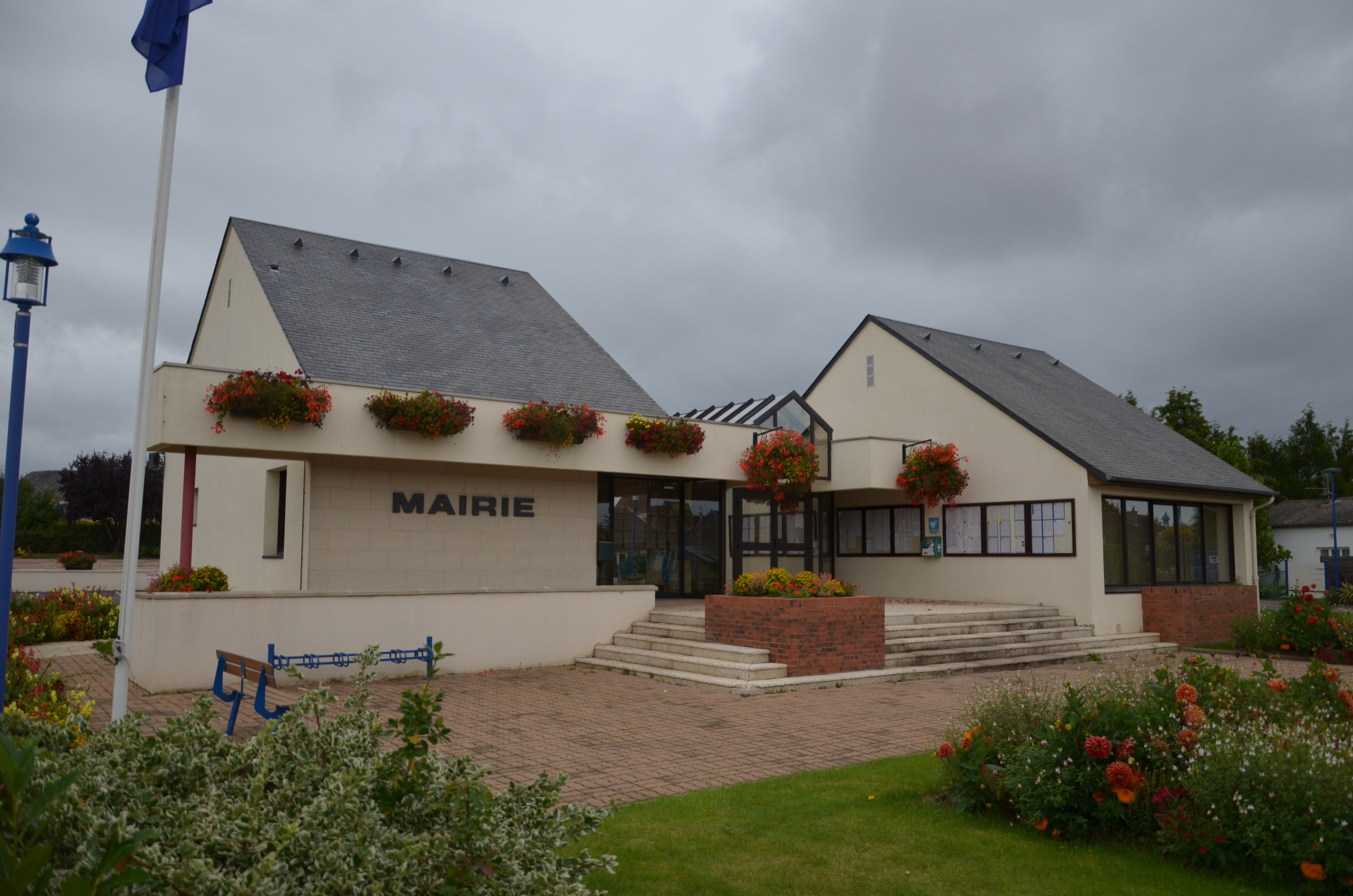
- The town hall in Grentheville
- Location of Grentheville
- Location within France Location within Normandy
- Coordinates: 49°08′57″N 0°17′09″W
- Country: France
- Region: Normandy
- Department: Calvados
- Arrondissement: Caen
- Canton: Évrecy
- Intercommunality: CU Caen la Mer

Government
  - Mayor (2020–2026): Emmanuel Bellee
- Area^{1}: 4.08 km^{2} (1.58 sq mi)
- Elevation: 25 m (82 ft)
- Highest elevation: 33 m (108 ft)
- Lowest elevation: 22 m (72 ft)
- Population (2023): 1,025
  - Density: 251/km^{2} (651/sq mi)
- Time zone: UTC+01:00 (CET)
  - Summer (DST): UTC+02:00 (CEST)
- INSEE/Postal code: 14319 /14540
- ^{1} French Land Register data, which excludes lakes, ponds, glaciers > 1 km^{2} (0.386 sq mi or 247 acres) and river estuaries.

Grentheville (French pronunciation: [ɡʁɑ̃tvil]) is a commune in the Calvados department in the Normandy region in northwestern France.

== Population ==
Historical population
Year	Pop.	±% p.a.
1968	224	—
1975	188	−2.47%
1982	311	+7.46%
1990	597	+8.49%
1999	753	+2.61%
2007	955	+3.02%
2012	884	−1.53%
2017	901	+0.38%
2023	1,025	+2.17%
Source: INSEE

== See also ==
- Communes of the Calvados department
