= Amayé-sur-Orne =

- Commune
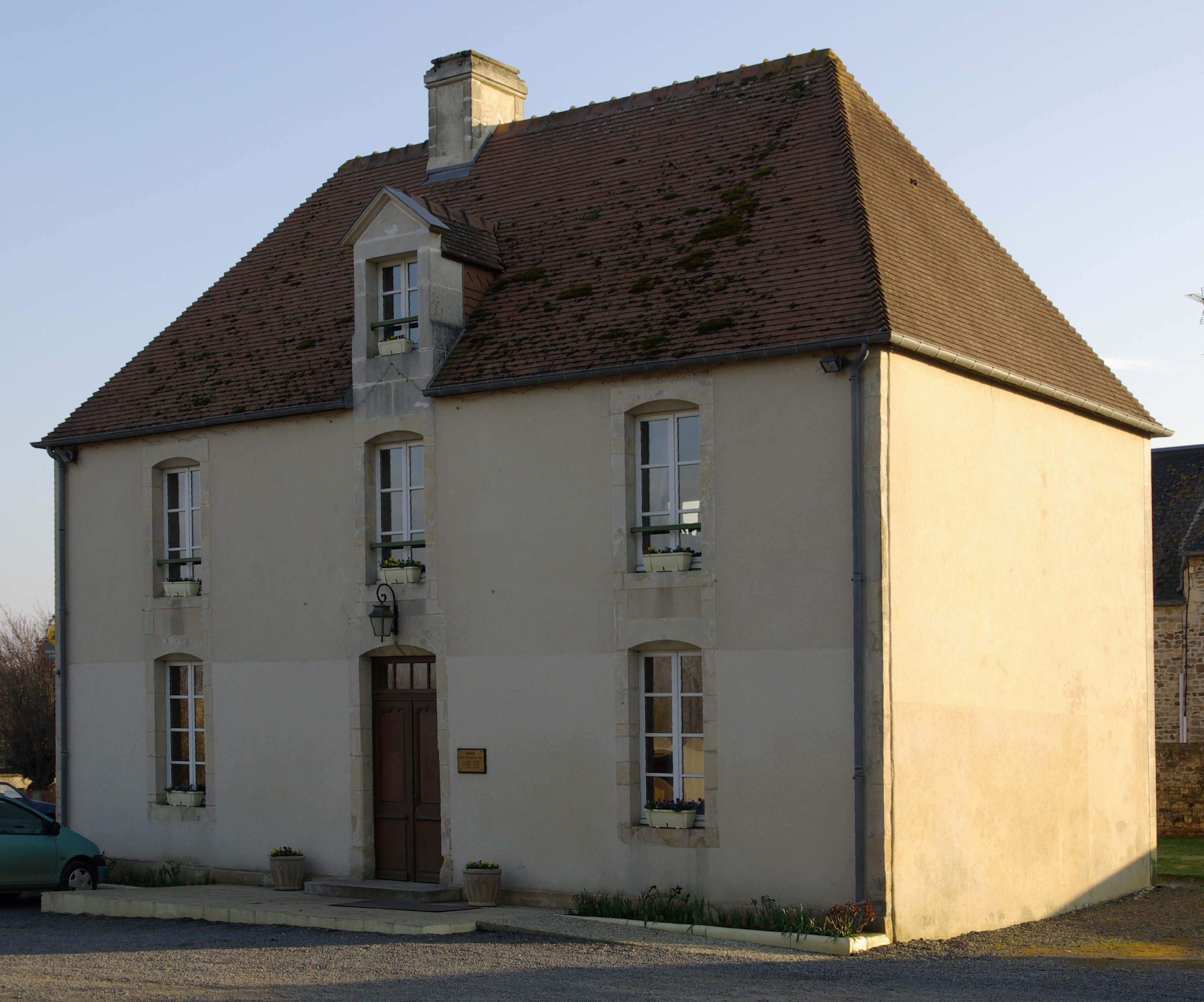
- The Town Hall

- Coat of arms
- Location of Amayé-sur-Orne
- Location within France Location within Normandy
- Coordinates: 49°05′09″N 0°26′16″W
- Country: France
- Region: Normandy
- Department: Calvados
- Arrondissement: Caen
- Canton: Évrecy
- Intercommunality: Vallées de l'Orne et de l'Odon

Government
  - Mayor (2020–2026): Sylvain Colino
- Area^{1}: 5.29 km^{2} (2.04 sq mi)
- Elevation: 50 m (160 ft)
- Highest elevation: 109 m (358 ft)
- Lowest elevation: 7 m (23 ft)
- Population (2023): 1,079
  - Density: 204/km^{2} (528/sq mi)
- Time zone: UTC+01:00 (CET)
  - Summer (DST): UTC+02:00 (CEST)
- INSEE/Postal code: 14006 /14210
- ^{1} French Land Register data, which excludes lakes, ponds, glaciers > 1 km^{2} (0.386 sq mi or 247 acres) and river estuaries.

Amayé-sur-Orne (French pronunciation: [amaje syʁ ɔʁn], literally Amayé on Orne) is a commune in the Calvados department in the Normandy region of northwestern France.

== Geography ==
Amayé-sur-Orne is located approximately 10 km south-west of Caen and 5 km east of Évrecy. It can be accessed by road D212 from Vieux in the north which continues south to Thury-Harcourt and by road D41 from Evrecy in the west which continues to Clinchamps-sur-Orne in the east. Closely located to the town are a number of hamlets including: Saint-Lambert, La Butte, Le Pont du Coudray, and Les Godets. These villages form a single conurbation with the village. The rest of the commune is entirely farmland.

The eastern border of the commune is formed by the river Orne. A stream, flows through the village and down to the Orne and another stream flowing to the Orne forms the southern boundary of the commune. The Guigne stream forms the northern border of the commune and also flows to the Orne.

=== Heraldry ===
Arms of Amayé-sur-Orne	Blazon: Party per fesse, the first gules a Danish cross of Or voided, to dexter chief two lions passant gardant the same; the second Vert, fess in chief argent, a chevron inverted of Or and chief of Or, a castel azure of two towers domed argent with walls sloped.

== Administration ==
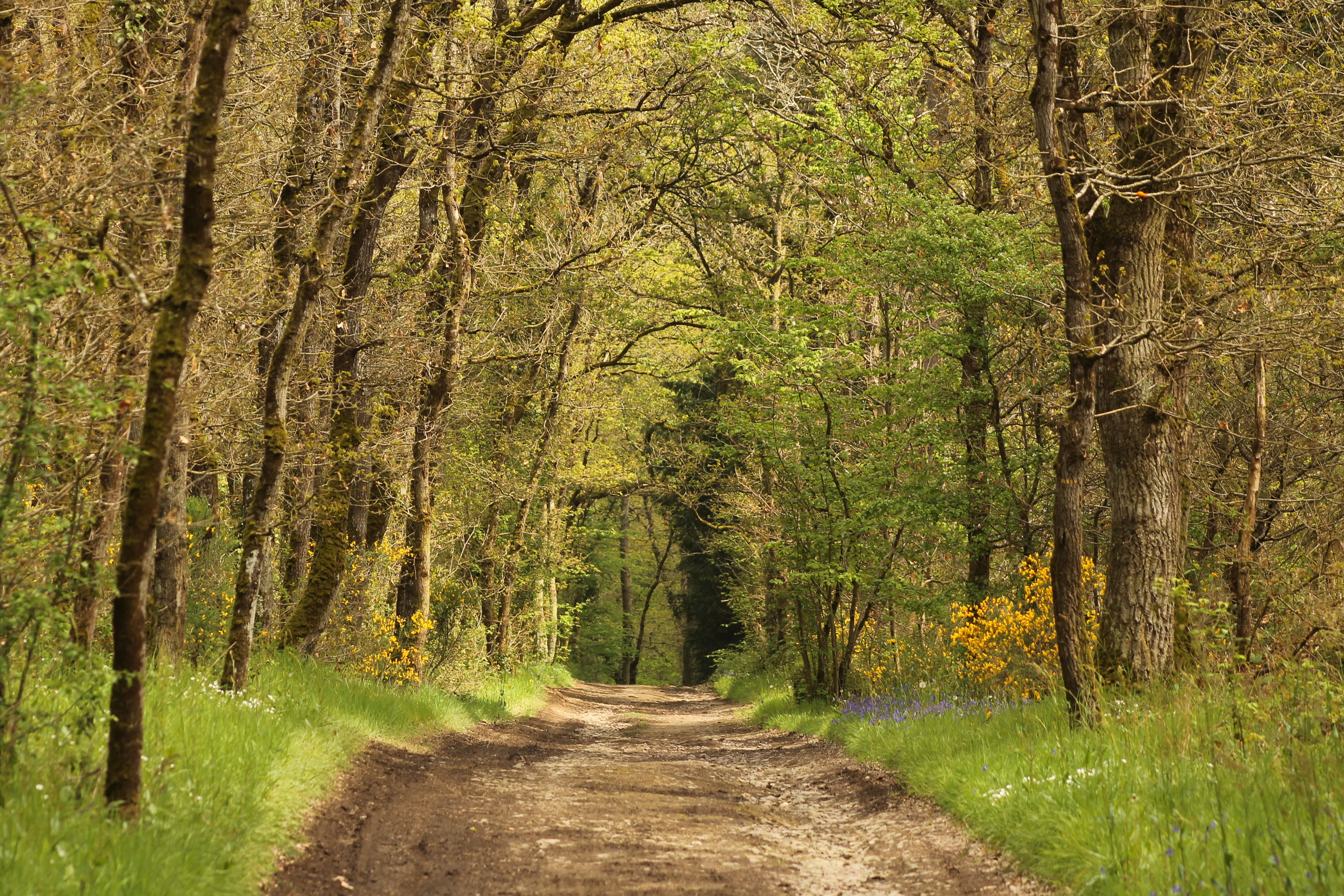
A Walking Path in Spring

List of Successive Mayors of Amayé-sur-Orne

From	To	Name	Party	Position
1987	1994	Jacques Dolley	ind.	Professor
1994	2001	André Porcher	ind.	CEO
2001	2008	Nicole Perly	ind.	
2008	2026	Sylvain Colino	ind.	Fire-fighter

== Population ==
Its inhabitants are known as Amayéens or Amayéennes in French.

Historical population
Year	Pop.	±% p.a.
1968	257	—
1975	420	+7.27%
1982	732	+8.26%
1990	722	−0.17%
1999	686	−0.57%
2007	982	+4.59%
2012	1,004	+0.44%
2017	1,001	−0.06%
2023	1,079	+1.26%
Source: INSEE

== Sites and Monuments ==
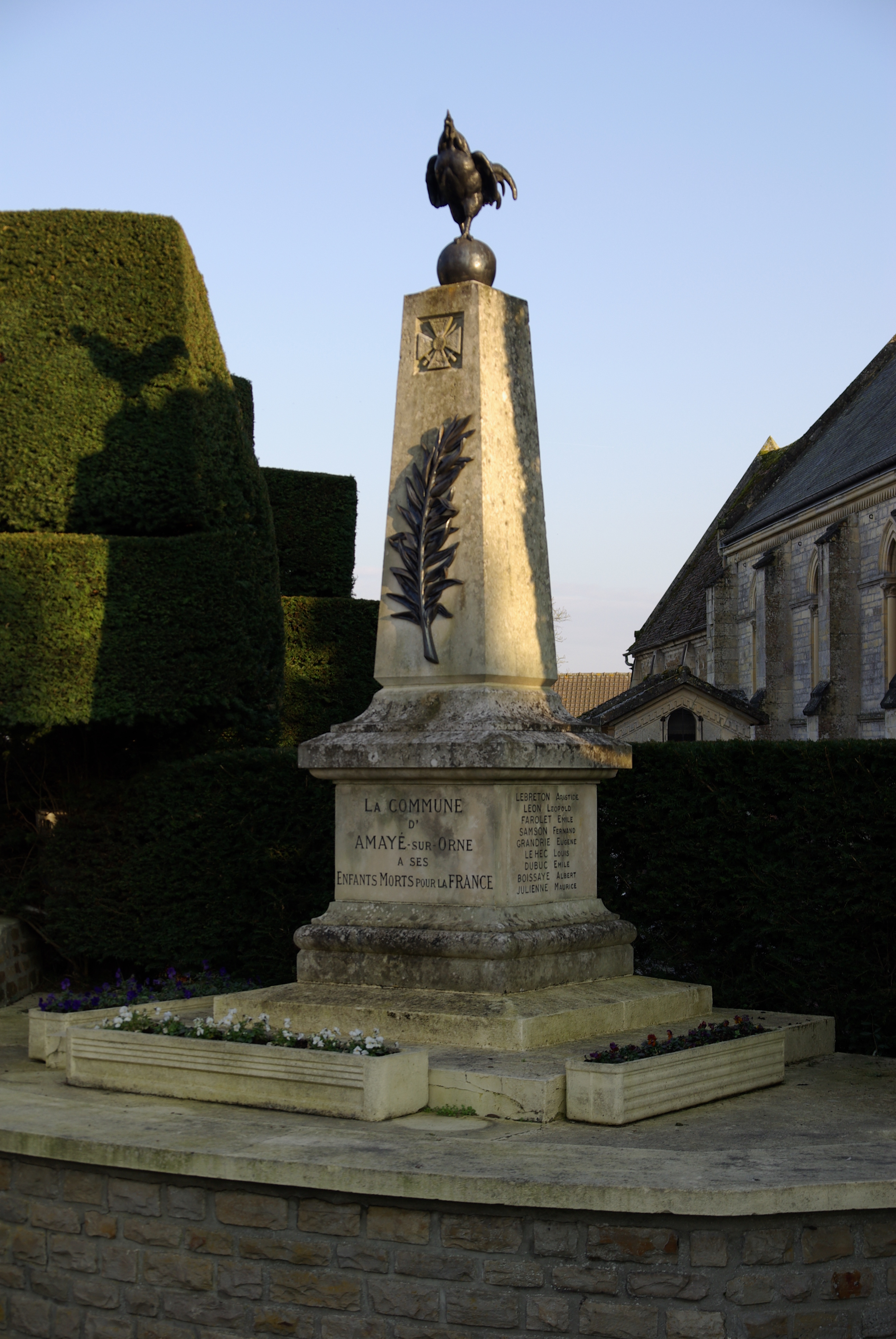
The War Memorial

- The Ifs Cemetery is a listed site (SC 9 January 1933)
- The 'Butte de l'Orne is another World Heritage Site (SC 9 January 1933)
- A Lavoir (Public laundry)
- The Chateau de la Butte (19th century)
- The Chateau de Vaux (18th century)

The Bell Tower Attic of the Church of Notre Dame hosts breeding colonies of large bats and is a registered Site of Community Importance (SIC)

== Gallery ==
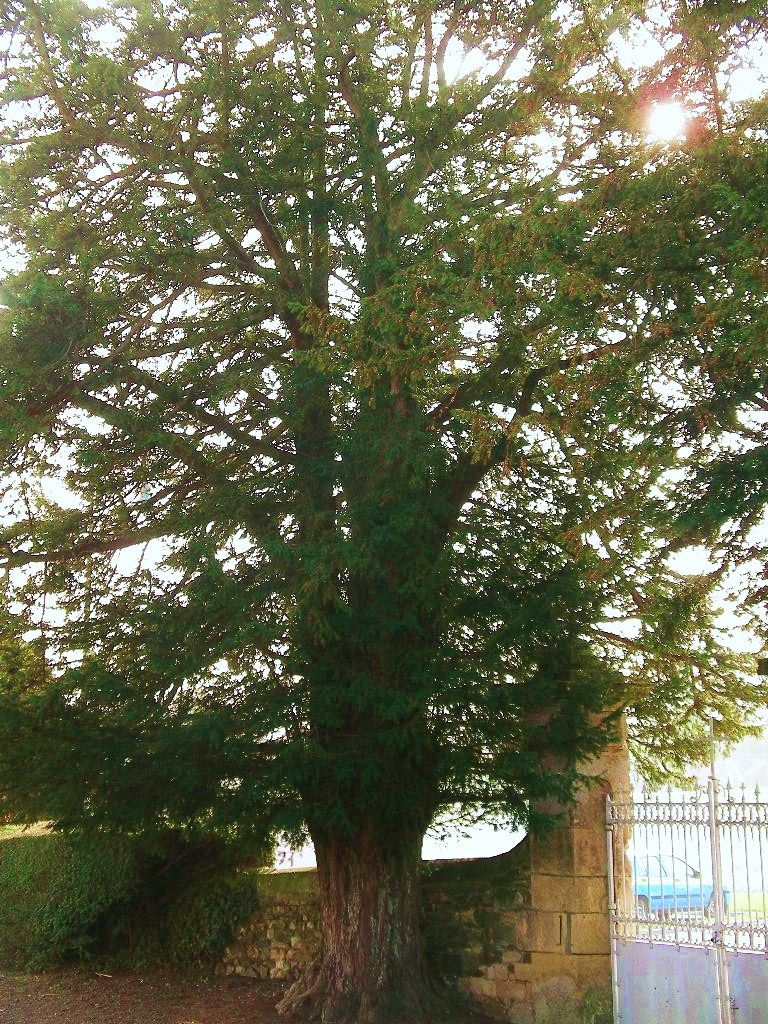
A yew tree in the cemetery

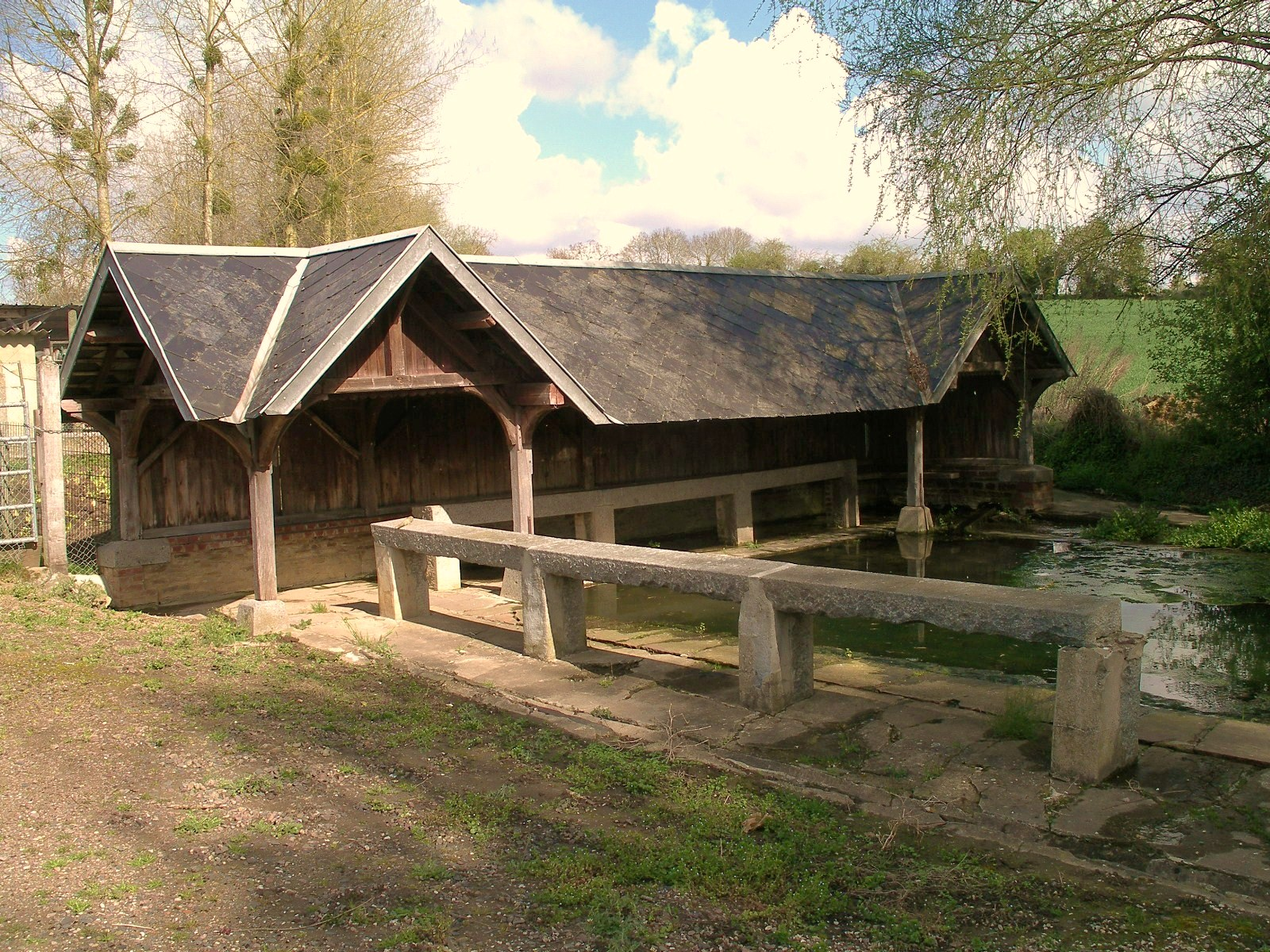
The Lavoir

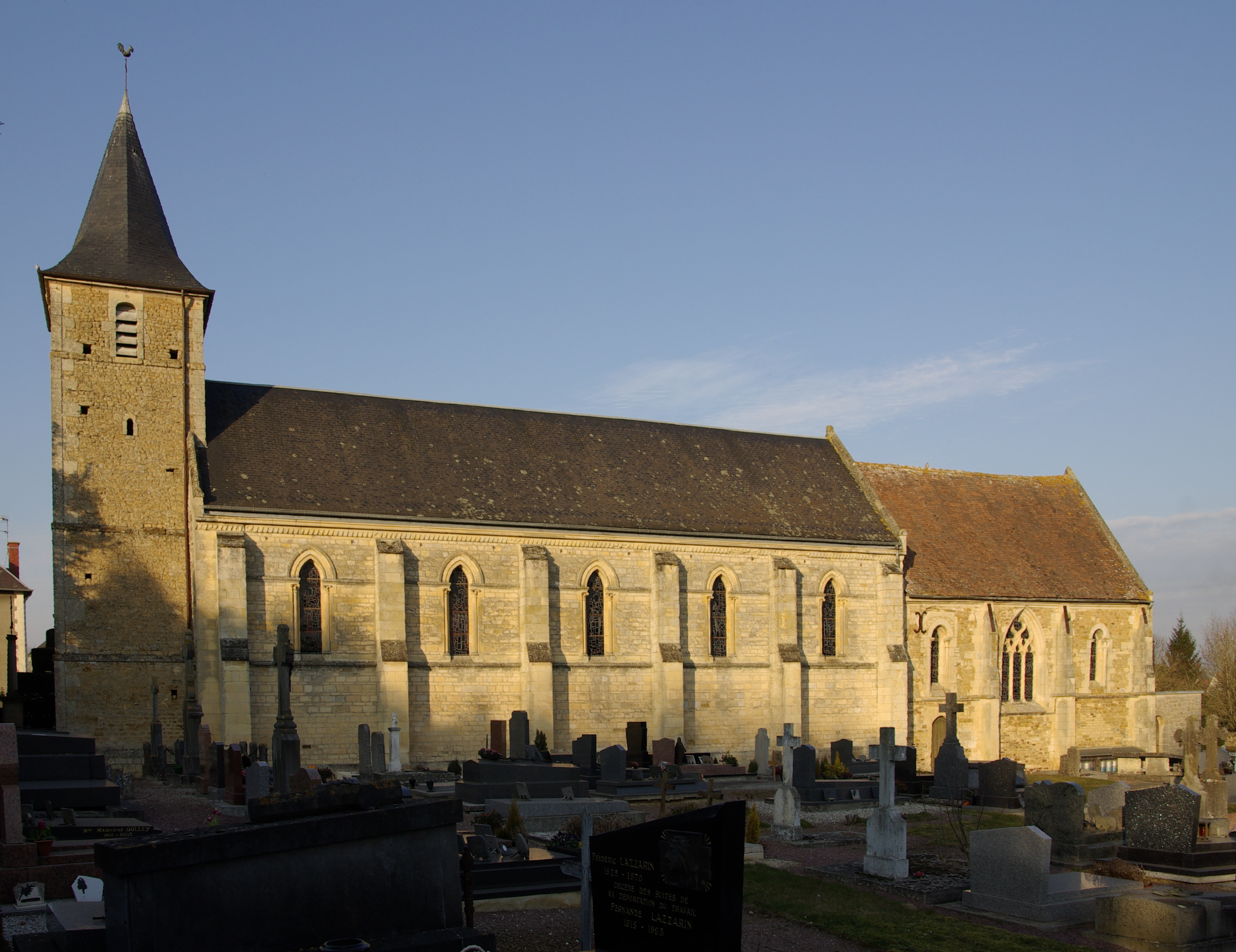
The Church of Notre-Dame

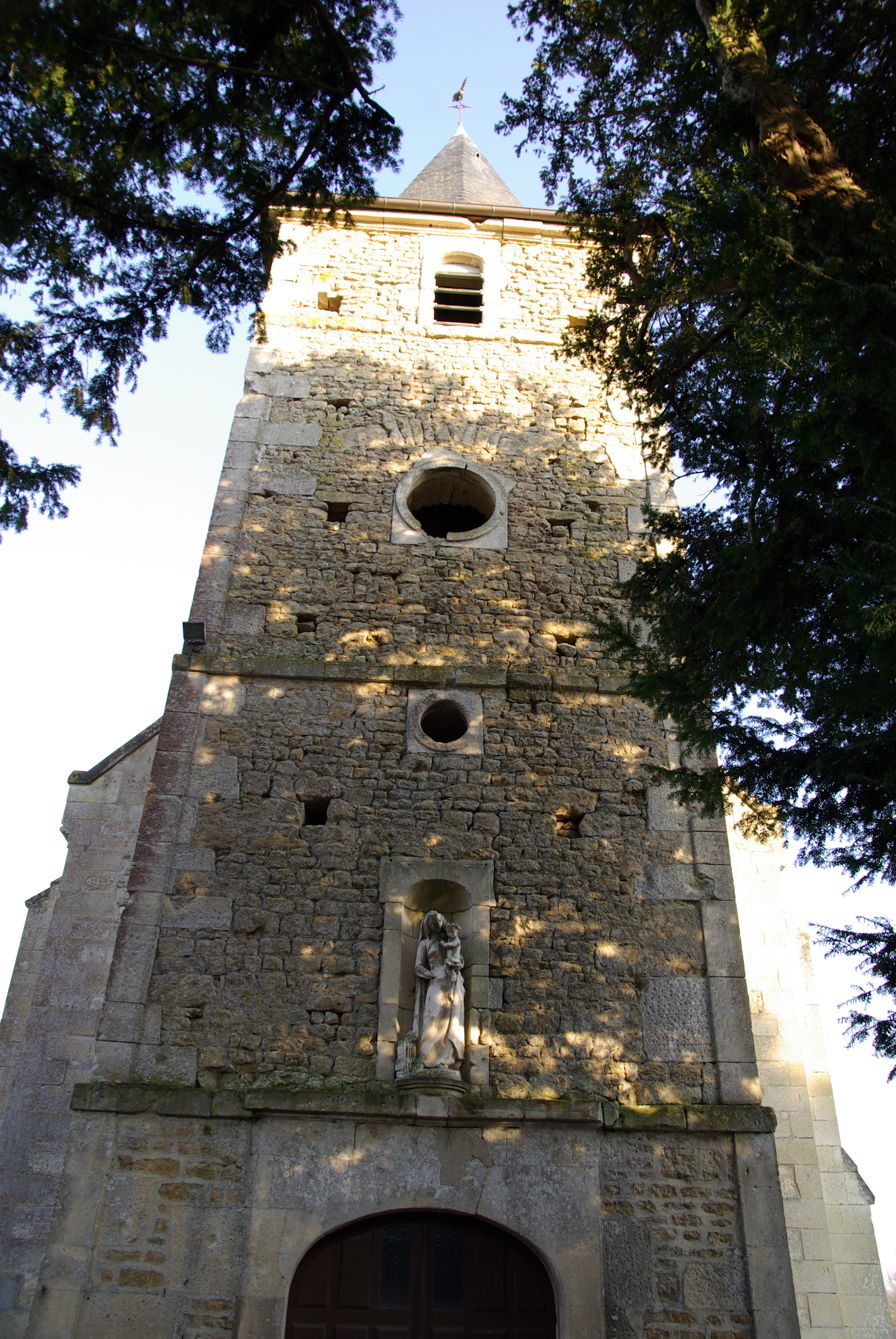
Church of Notre Dame bell tower

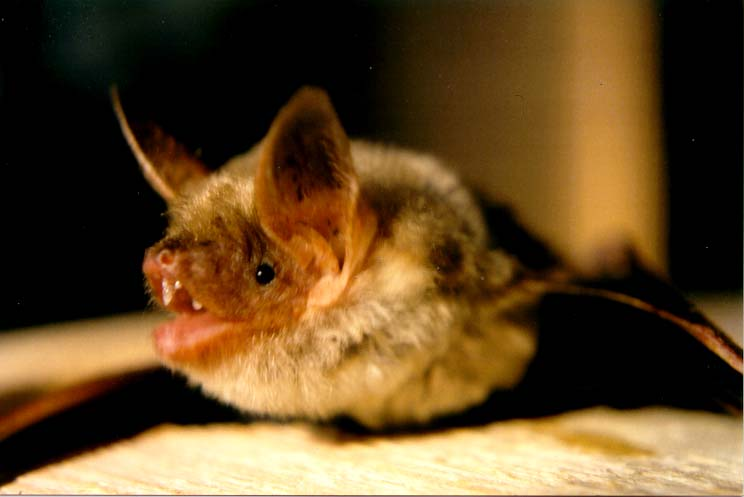
Greater mouse-eared bat

== Twin towns – sister cities ==
Amayé-sur-Orne, along with eight other communes, Avenay, Maizet, Montigny, Préaux-Bocage, Maisoncelles-sur-Ajon, Sainte-Honorine-du-Fay, Vacognes-Neuilly and Montillières-sur-Orne, is a member of The ICL Val Orne, which has organised being twinned with:

- (Germany) Johannesberg, Bavaria since 1991

== See also ==
- Communes of the Calvados department
