= Clinchamps-sur-Orne =

- Part of Laize-Clinchamps
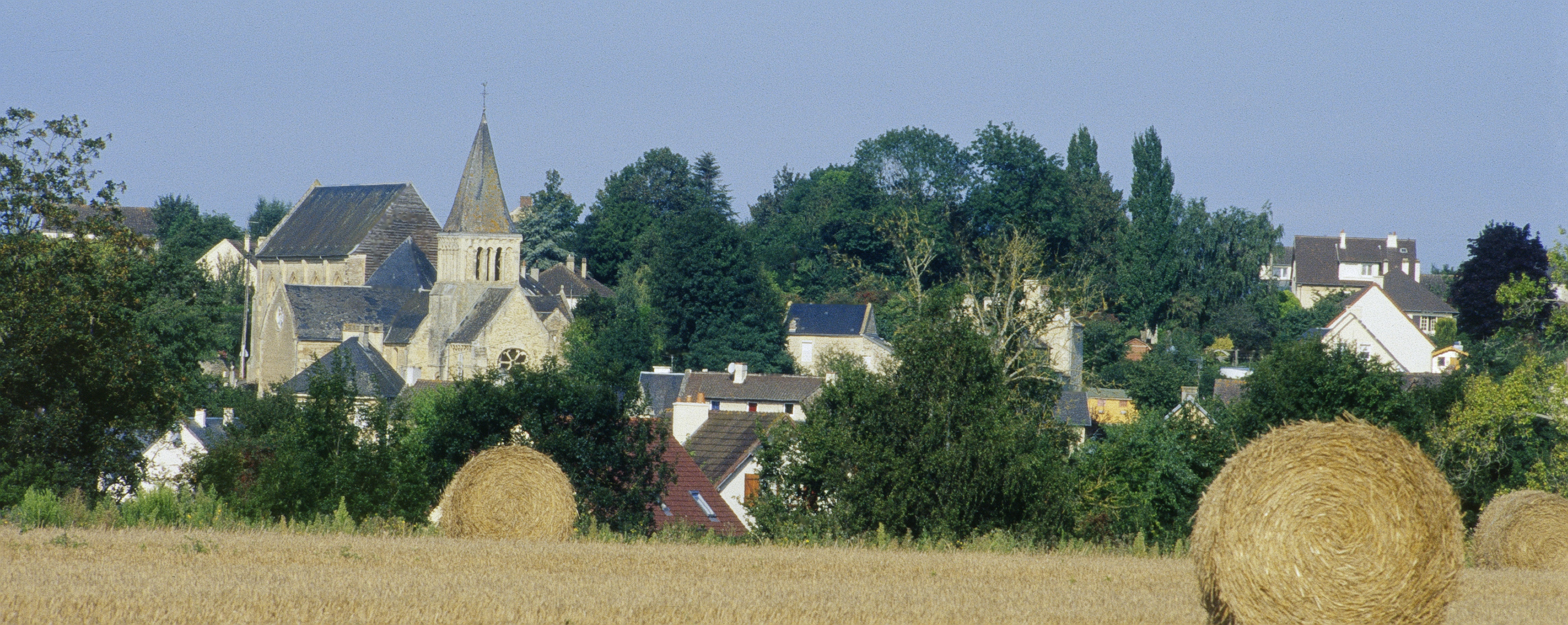
- Location of Clinchamps-sur-Orne
- Location within France Location within Normandy
- Coordinates: 49°04′51″N 0°23′59″W
- Country: France
- Region: Normandy
- Department: Calvados
- Arrondissement: Caen
- Canton: Évrecy
- Commune: Laize-Clinchamps
- Area^{1}: 6.37 km^{2} (2.46 sq mi)
- Elevation: 80 m (260 ft)
- Highest elevation: 98 m (322 ft)
- Lowest elevation: 6 m (20 ft)
- Population (2022): 1,349
  - Density: 212/km^{2} (548/sq mi)
- Time zone: UTC+01:00 (CET)
  - Summer (DST): UTC+02:00 (CEST)
- Postal code: 14320
- ^{1} French Land Register data, which excludes lakes, ponds, glaciers > 1 km^{2} (0.386 sq mi or 247 acres) and river estuaries.

Clinchamps-sur-Orne (French pronunciation: [klɛ̃ʃɑ̃ syʁ ɔʁn], literally Clinchamps on Orne) is a former commune in the Calvados department in the Normandy region in northwestern France. On 1 January 2017, it was merged into the new commune Laize-Clinchamps.

== Population ==
Historical population
Year	Pop.	±% p.a.
1962	493	—
1968	532	+1.28%
1975	523	−0.24%
1982	618	+2.41%
1990	804	+3.34%
1999	969	+2.10%
2008	1,010	+0.46%
2022	1,349	+2.09%
Source: EHESS and INSEE

== See also ==
- Communes of the Calvados department
