= Feuguerolles-Bully =

- Commune
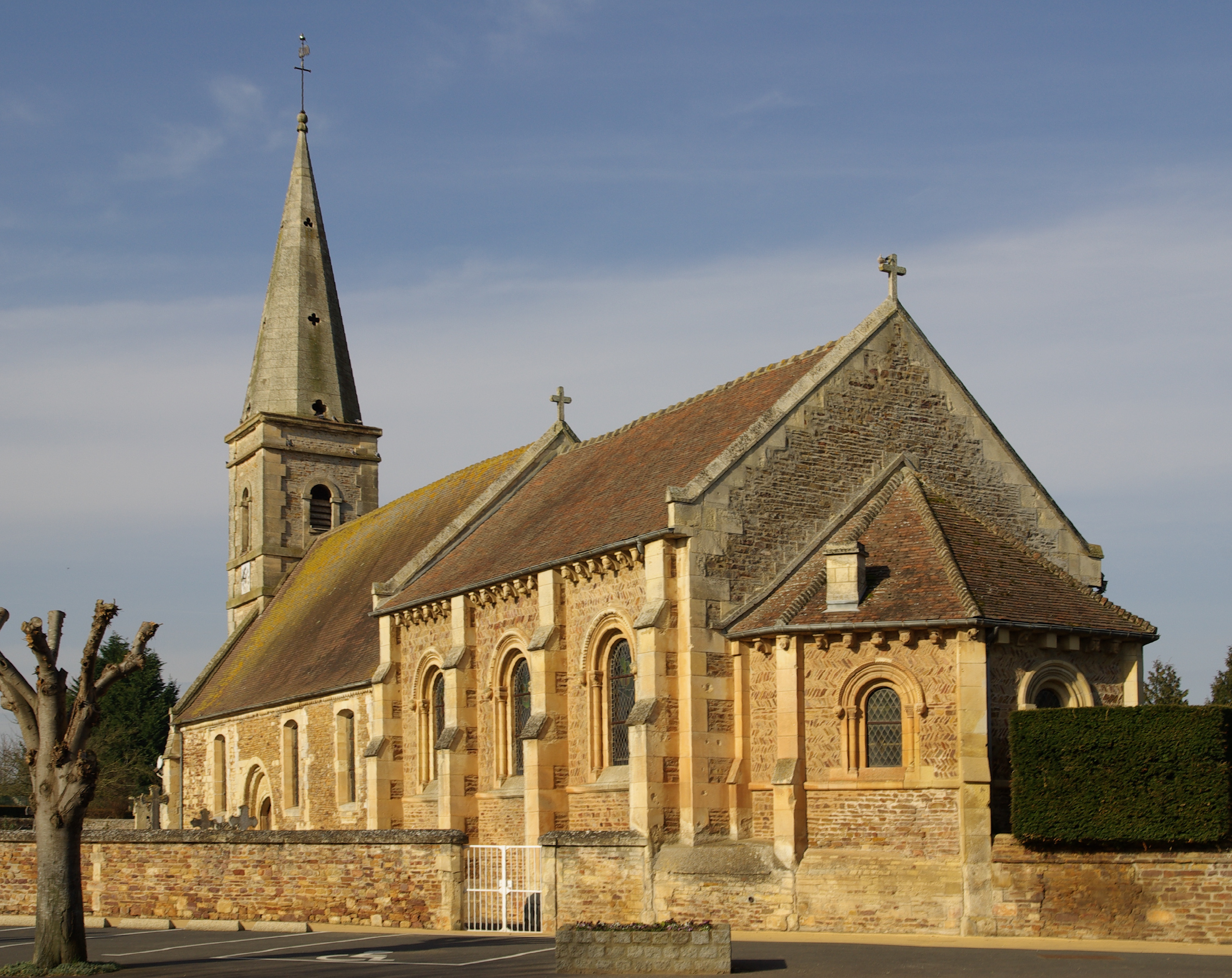
- The church in Feuguerolles-Bully
- Location of Feuguerolles-Bully
- Location within France Location within Normandy
- Coordinates: 49°07′03″N 0°24′21″W
- Country: France
- Region: Normandy
- Department: Calvados
- Arrondissement: Caen
- Canton: Évrecy

Government
  - Mayor (2020–2026): Franck Robillard
- Area^{1}: 8.18 km^{2} (3.16 sq mi)
- Elevation: 90 m (300 ft)
- Highest elevation: 78 m (256 ft)
- Lowest elevation: 4 m (13 ft)
- Population (2023): 1,520
  - Density: 186/km^{2} (481/sq mi)
- Time zone: UTC+01:00 (CET)
  - Summer (DST): UTC+02:00 (CEST)
- INSEE/Postal code: 14266 /14320
- ^{1} French Land Register data, which excludes lakes, ponds, glaciers > 1 km^{2} (0.386 sq mi or 247 acres) and river estuaries.

Feuguerolles-Bully (French pronunciation: [føɡ(ə)ʁɔl byli]) is a commune in the Calvados department in the Normandy region of northwestern France.

== Geography ==
The commune is made up of the following collection of villages and hamlets, Bully and Feuguerolles-Bully. Two rivers, the Orne and Guigne flow through the commune.

=== Climate ===
In 2010, the climate was classified as altered oceanic climate, according to a CNRS study based on data covering the period from 1971 to 2000. In 2020, Météo-France published a climate typology for metropolitan France in which the commune was subject to an oceanic climate and is located in the climatic region of Normandy (Cotentin, Orne), characterized by relatively high rainfall (850 mm/year), a cool summer (15.5 °C), and windy conditions.

At the same time, the Normandy IPCC, a regional group of climate experts, described in a 2020 study three major types of climates for the Normandy region, further nuanced by local geographical factors. According to this, the commune is exposed to a "sheltered plateau climate," corresponding to the agricultural plain from Caen to Falaise, sheltered by the Normandy hills and close to the sea, characterized by moderate rainfall and thermal constraints.

From 1971–2000, the average annual temperature was 10.6 °C, with an annual thermal amplitude of 12 °C. The average annual precipitation was 750 mm, with 12.3 days of rain in January and 7.7 days in July. For the period 1991–2020, the average annual temperature recorded at the nearest weather station, located in Carpiquet 8 km away, was 11.5 °C, and the average annual precipitation was 740.3 mm. Future climate parameters for the commune were estimated for 2050 based on greenhouse gas emission scenarios in November 2022.

== Demographics ==
Historical population
| Year | Pop. | ±% p.a. |
|---|---|---|
| 1968 | 566 | — |
| 1975 | 612 | +1.12% |
| 1982 | 904 | +5.73% |
| 1990 | 1,105 | +2.54% |
| 1999 | 1,125 | +0.20% |
| 2007 | 1,305 | +1.87% |
| 2012 | 1,392 | +1.30% |
| 2017 | 1,428 | +0.51% |
| 2023 | 1,520 | +1.05% |
Source: INSEE

== Urban Planning ==
=== Typology ===
As of 1 January 2024, Feuguerolles-Bully is categorized as an urban belt, according to the 7-level density grid defined by INSEE in 2022. It is located outside of an urban unit.

== Points of Interest ==
- Vestiges Concasseurs des mines de fer - the remains of the old iron mines, along a footpath.

=== National Heritage sites ===
The Commune has two buildings and areas listed as a Monument historique

- Église Saint-Martin de Bully eleventh century church listed as a monument in 1933.
- Romanesque cross a twelfth century church listed as a monument in 1932.

== See also ==
- Communes of the Calvados department
