= Avenay =

- Commune
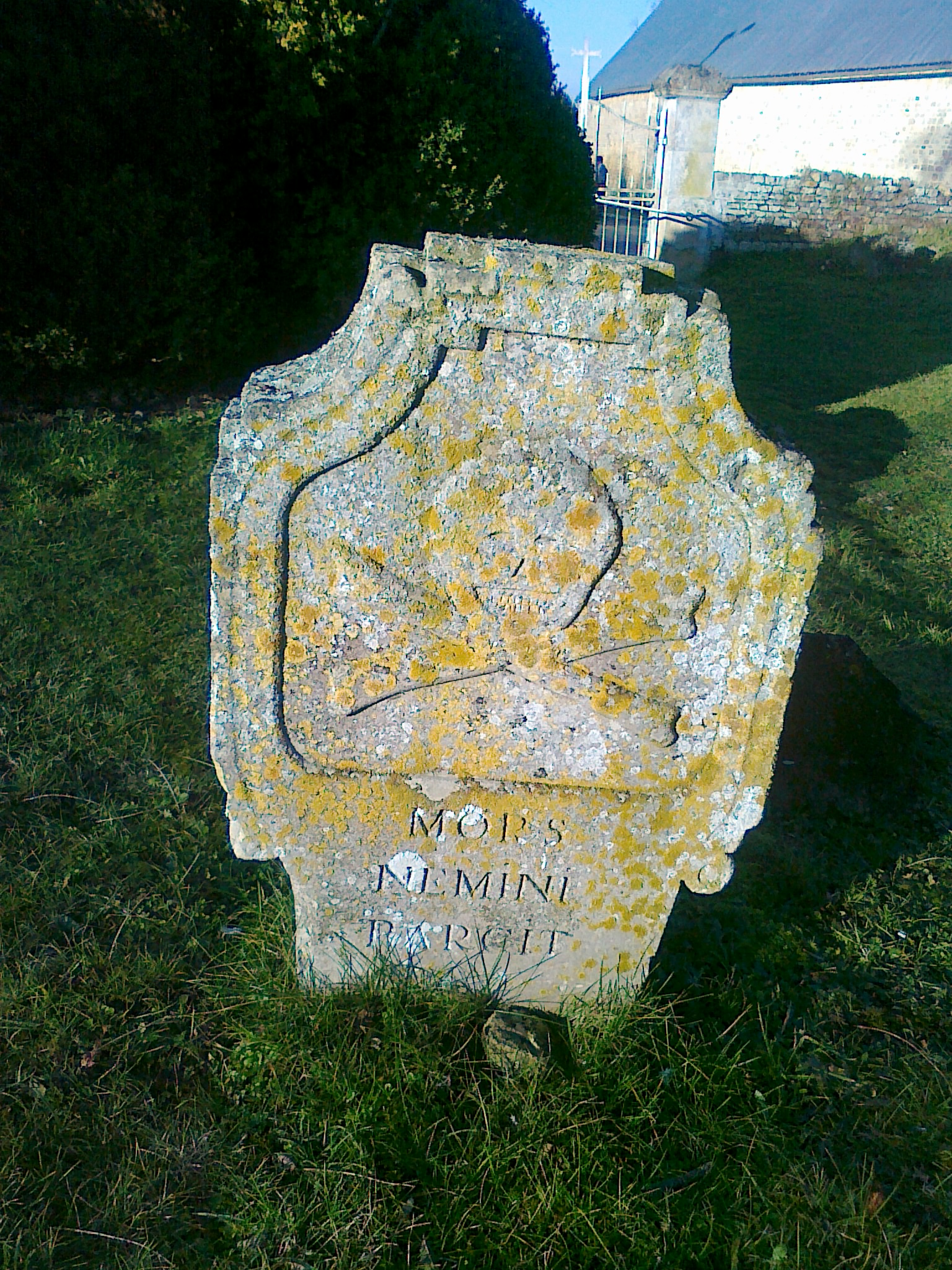
- Tombstone in the old Fierville Church at Avenay
- Location of Avenay
- Location within France Location within Normandy
- Coordinates: 49°06′07″N 0°27′32″W
- Country: France
- Region: Normandy
- Department: Calvados
- Arrondissement: Caen
- Canton: Évrecy
- Intercommunality: CC Vallées Orne Odon

Government
  - Mayor (2020–2026): Françoise Paris
- Area^{1}: 5.62 km^{2} (2.17 sq mi)
- Elevation: 90 m (300 ft)
- Highest elevation: 120 m (390 ft)
- Lowest elevation: 35 m (115 ft)
- Population (2023): 555
  - Density: 98.8/km^{2} (256/sq mi)
- Time zone: UTC+01:00 (CET)
  - Summer (DST): UTC+02:00 (CEST)
- INSEE/Postal code: 14034 /14210
- ^{1} French Land Register data, which excludes lakes, ponds, glaciers > 1 km^{2} (0.386 sq mi or 247 acres) and river estuaries.

Avenay (French pronunciation: [avnɛ]) is a commune in the Calvados department in the Normandy region of north-western France.

== Geography ==
Avenay is located some 12 km south-west of Caen just east of Évrecy. Access to the commune is by the D36 road from Sainte-Honorine-du-Fay in the south-west which passes through the heart of the commune and the village and continues north to join the D8. Apart from the village there is the hamlet of La Coquerie on the eastern border. The commune consists entirely of farmland.

The Guigne river flows along the northern border of the commune towards the east where it joins the Orne south of Bully.

== History ==
The oldest traces of Avenay village date from Gallo-Roman times. In 1820-1821 some remains of Gallo-Roman houses were found. In the Middle Ages, the village depended on the Bishop of Bayeux.

In 1827 Avenay (336 inhabitants in 1821) absorbed Fierville-en-Bessin (68 people) in the east of its territory.

== Administration ==
List of Successive Mayors

From	To	Name
	1850	Louis Touraille
1850	1860	Jean Labbé
1860	1863	Adolphe Viel
1863	1870	Pierre Gallet
1870	1872	Jean-Louis Londe
1872	1875	Edouard Accard
1875	1881	Gustave Feron
1881	1883	Pierre Sauvage
1883	1902	Jean-Louis Londe
1902	1909	Louis Lebrun
1909	1923	Émile Lemoine
1923	1937	Louis Lemonnier
1937	1945	Jean Barbot
1945	1977	Pierre Lecorsu
1977	1989	François Lecorsu
1989	1995	Lucien Martin
1995	2014	Gérard Lemoine
2014	2020	Jean-Louis Lechevalier
2020	2026	Françoise Paris

== Demography ==
This table includes the population of Fierville-en-Bassin prior to 1827.

Historical population

Year	Pop.	±% p.a.
1793	390	—
1821	404	+0.13%
1846	435	+0.30%
1872	345	−0.89%
1901	238	−1.27%
1926	239	+0.02%
1936	232	−0.30%
1946	184	−2.29%
1954	210	+1.67%
1962	238	+1.58%

Year	Pop.	±% p.a.
1968	293	+3.53%
1975	302	+0.43%
1982	372	+3.02%
1990	384	+0.40%
1999	406	+0.62%
2007	504	+2.74%
2012	524	+0.78%
2017	557	+1.23%
2023	555	−0.06%

Source: EHESS and INSEE

== Sites and Monuments ==
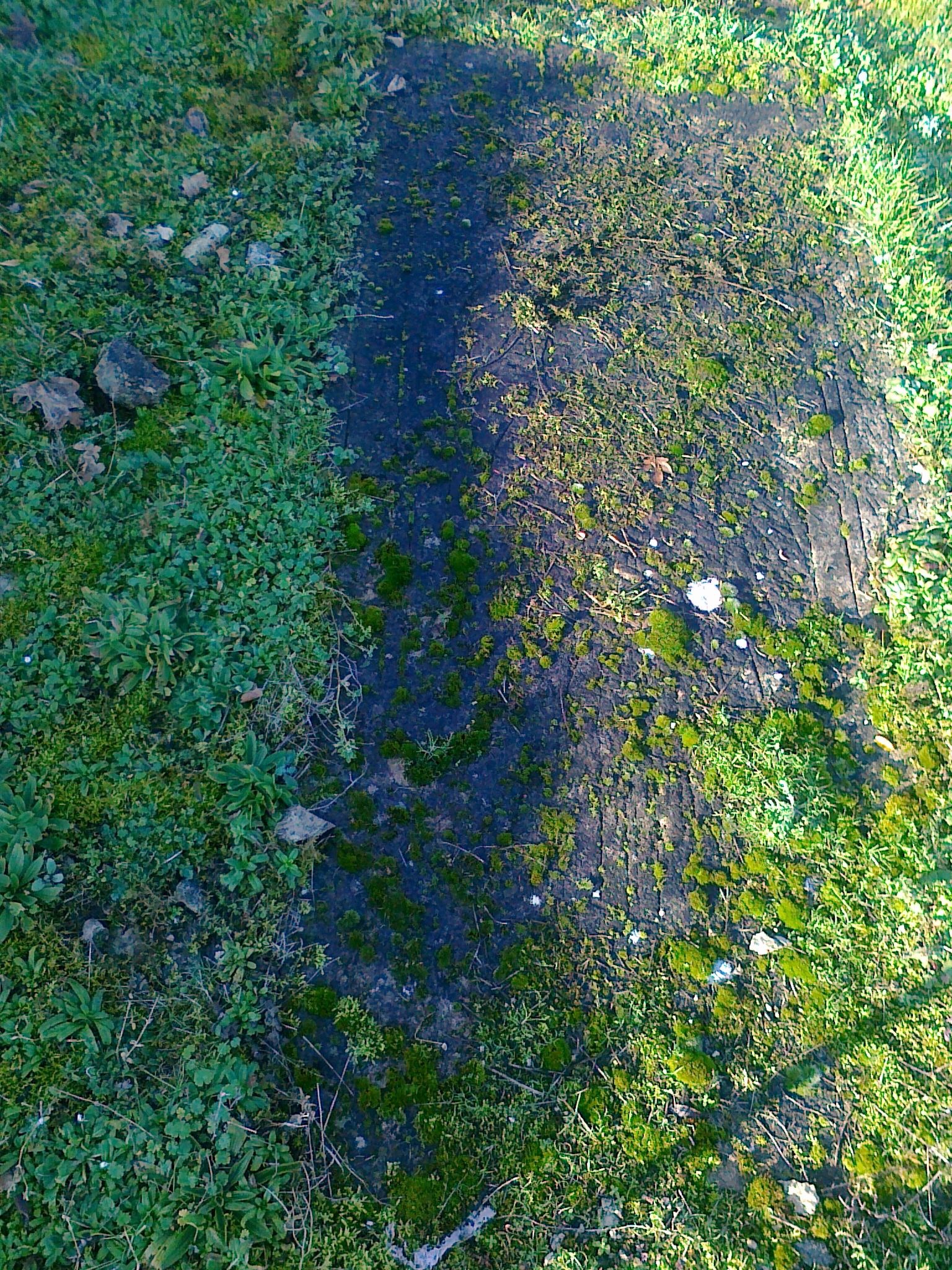
Tomb in the old Fierville Church

- The Church of Mary of the Assumption (Reconstruction).
- Ruins of the Church of Fierville.
- The Chateau of Fierville (16th century).
- Pompierre Manor (15th century).

== Activities and events ==
Each year, during the 3rd weekend in June, the Festival Committee of Avenay organises an inter-regional competition of bread.

One hundred bakers are judged every year. The competition focuses on different types of bread: Pain brié, Pain de campagne, traditional Baguettes, Croissants etc.

The jury, composed of baking professionals and consumers, use many criteria of quality and presentation.

The results are announced on Sunday afternoon at the fair in the village. The fair begins with a snack of Tripe at 9 am which brings hundreds of gourmands. The day continues with Mass and an exceptional sale of gold tripe.

On this day, the bakers make bread and pastries using bakery equipment and ovens installed specially for the festival. Visitors can buy bread made before their eyes.

The school fair is also held on the same day. On this occasion the students of the school perform several Norman dances in traditional costumes.

== Twin towns – sister cities ==
Avenay, along with eight other communes, Amayé-sur-Orne, Maizet, Montigny, Préaux-Bocage, Maisoncelles-sur-Ajon, Sainte-Honorine-du-Fay, Vacognes-Neuilly and Montillières-sur-Orne, is a member of The ICL Val Orne, which has organised being twinned with:

- (Germany) Johannesberg, Bavaria.

== See also ==
- Communes of the Calvados department
