= Sainte-Honorine-du-Fay =

- Commune
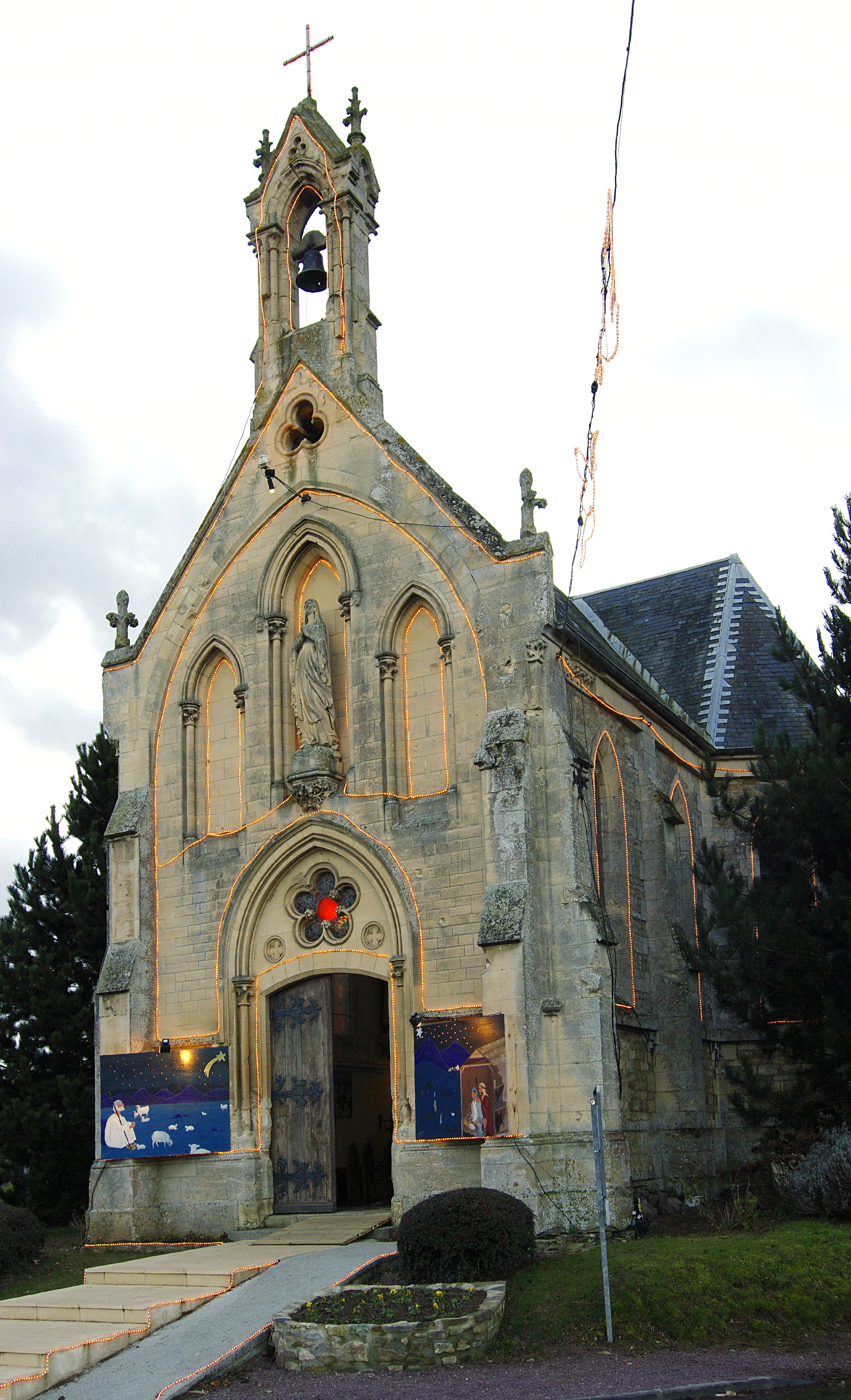
- Chapelle de Jalousie

- Coat of arms
- Location of Sainte-Honorine-du-Fay
- Location within France Location within Normandy
- Coordinates: 49°04′41″N 0°29′28″W
- Country: France
- Region: Normandy
- Department: Calvados
- Arrondissement: Caen
- Canton: Évrecy
- Intercommunality: Vallées de l'Orne et de l'Odon

Government
  - Mayor (2020–2026): Alain Mauger
- Area^{1}: 7.56 km^{2} (2.92 sq mi)
- Elevation: 120 m (390 ft)
- Highest elevation: 156 m (512 ft)
- Lowest elevation: 10 m (33 ft)
- Population (2023): 1,362
  - Density: 180/km^{2} (467/sq mi)
- Time zone: UTC+01:00 (CET)
  - Summer (DST): UTC+02:00 (CEST)
- INSEE/Postal code: 14592 /14210
- ^{1} French Land Register data, which excludes lakes, ponds, glaciers > 1 km^{2} (0.386 sq mi or 247 acres) and river estuaries.

Sainte-Honorine-du-Fay (French pronunciation: [sɛ̃t ɔnɔʁin dy fɛ]) is a commune in the Calvados department in the Normandy region in northwestern France.

== Geography ==
The commune is made up of the following collection of villages and hamlets, Le Bosq de Fay, Le Homme, Le Val Joie, Bretteville and Flagy.

Two rivers flow through the commune, the Guigne and the Orne. In addition two streams the Ruisseau de la Planquette and the Ruisseau de Verdun traverse the commune.

The commune is on the border of the area known as Suisse Normande.

== Population ==
Historical population
Year	Pop.	±% p.a.
1968	495	—
1975	644	+3.83%
1982	927	+5.34%
1990	1,065	+1.75%
1999	1,085	+0.21%
2007	1,184	+1.10%
2012	1,314	+2.11%
2017	1,339	+0.38%
2023	1,362	+0.28%
Source: INSEE

== Twin towns – sister cities ==
Sainte-Honorine-du-Fay, along with eight other communes, Amayé-sur-Orne, Maizet, Montigny, Préaux-Bocage, Maisoncelles-sur-Ajon, Avenay, Vacognes-Neuilly and Montillières-sur-Orne, is a member of The ICL Val Orne, which has organised being twinned with:

- (Germany) Johannesberg, Bavaria.

In addition the commune is twinned with:

- Swimbridge, England.

== See also ==
- Communes of the Calvados department
