= Pain brié =

Traditional Normandy bread

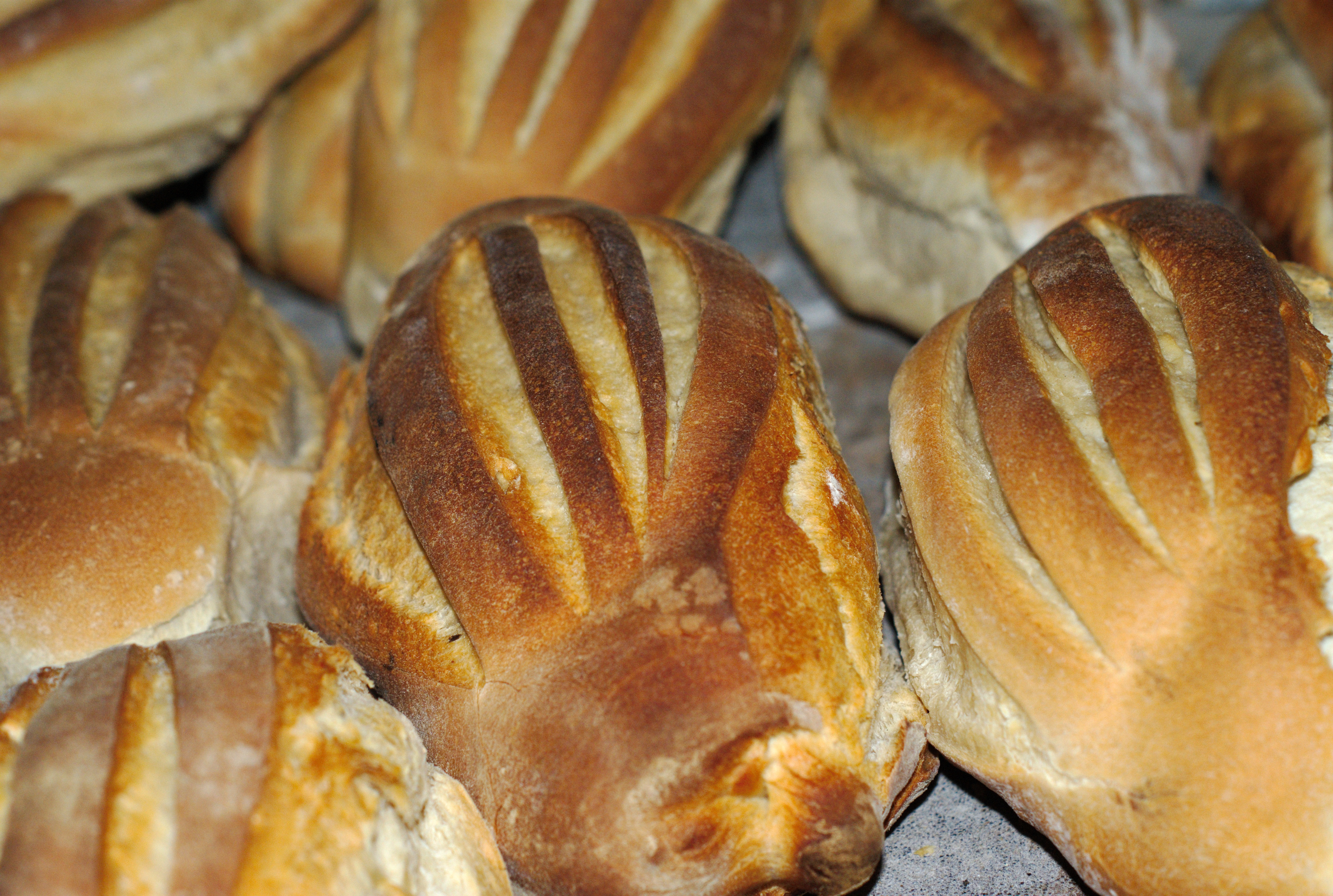
- Type: Bread
- Place of origin: France
- Region or state: Normandy
- Main ingredients: Flour, water, baker's yeast

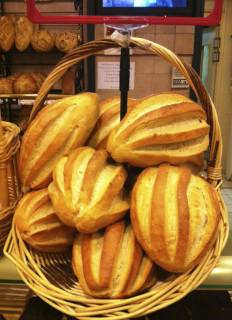
Pain brié

Pain brié (French pronunciation: [pɛ̃ bʁije]) is a traditional Normandy bread. Its name comes from the pounding of the dough, as "brie" is derived from the Old Norman verb brier, meaning "to pound". The preparation includes a long kneading period and a beating of the dough, which tightens it, producing a heavy, yeasted bread with a tight crumb. It used to be the bread given to fishermen and sailors.
