= Goupillières, Calvados =

Goupillières
- Part of Montillières-sur-Orne
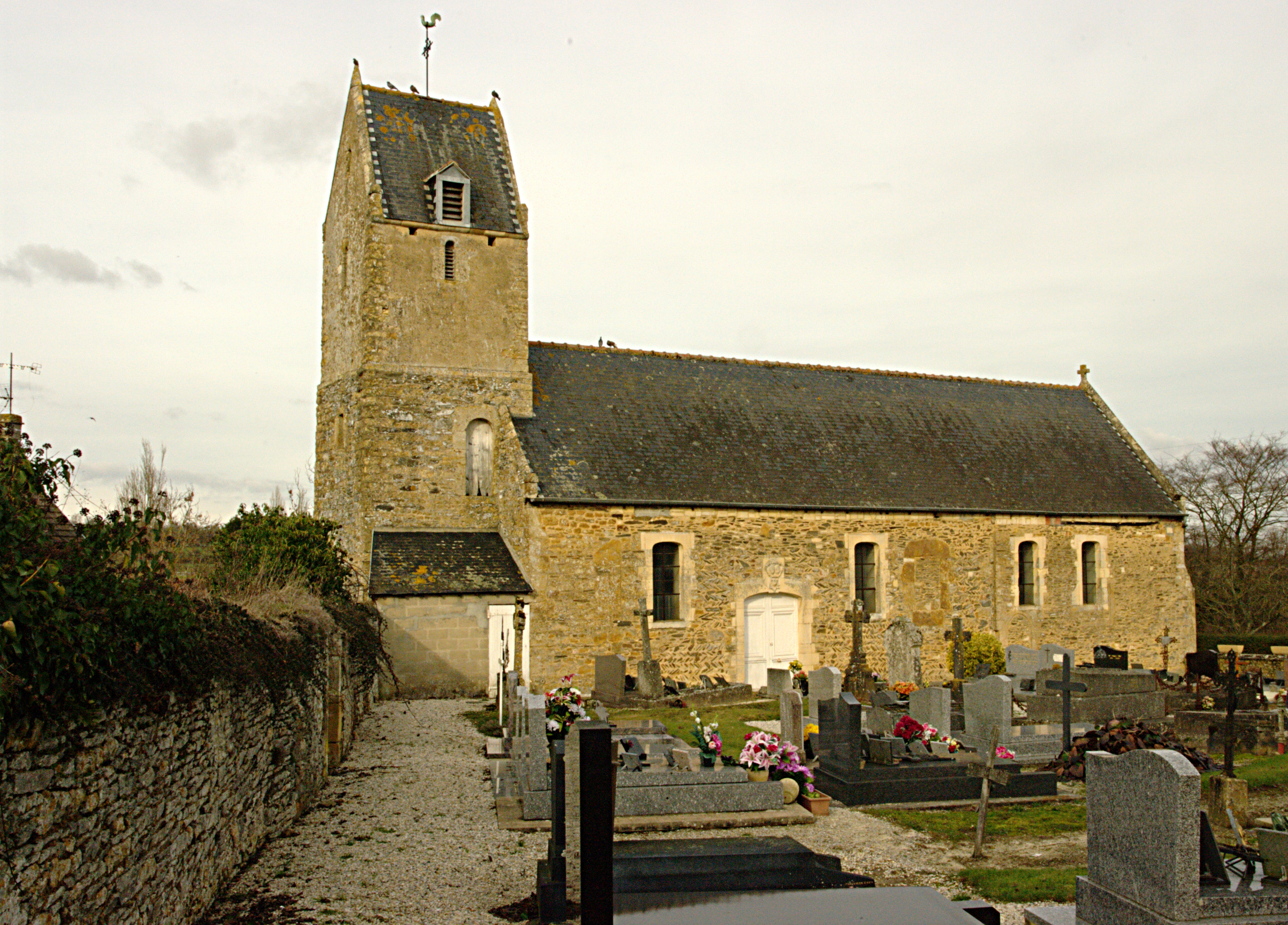
- The church in Goupillières
- Location of Goupillières
- Location within France Location within Normandy
- Coordinates: 49°01′58″N 0°28′42″W
- Country: France
- Region: Normandy
- Department: Calvados
- Arrondissement: Caen
- Canton: Le Hom
- Commune: Montillières-sur-Orne
- Area^{1}: 2.27 km^{2} (0.88 sq mi)
- Elevation: 117 m (384 ft)
- Highest elevation: 165 m (541 ft)
- Lowest elevation: 14 m (46 ft)
- Population (2016): 178
  - Density: 78.4/km^{2} (203/sq mi)
- Time zone: UTC+01:00 (CET)
  - Summer (DST): UTC+02:00 (CEST)
- Postal code: 14210
- ^{1} French Land Register data, which excludes lakes, ponds, glaciers > 1 km^{2} (0.386 sq mi or 247 acres) and river estuaries.

Goupillières (French pronunciation: [ɡupijɛʁ]) is a former commune in the Calvados department in the Normandy region in northwestern France. On 1 January 2019, it was merged into the new commune Montillières-sur-Orne.

The former commune is part of the area known as Suisse Normande.

== See also ==
- Communes of the Calvados department
