= Maisoncelles-sur-Ajon =

- Commune
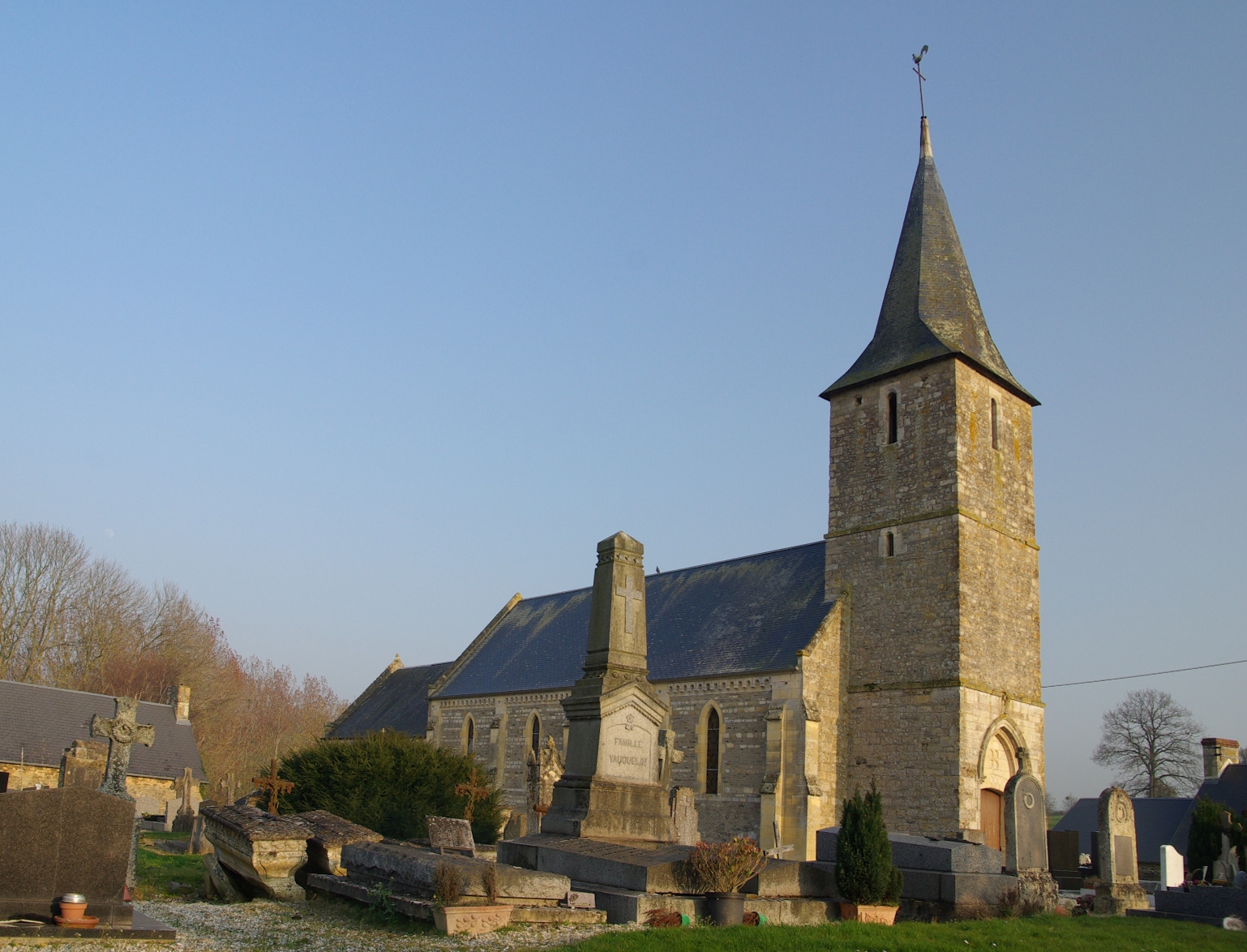
- The church in Maisoncelles-sur-Ajon
- Location of Maisoncelles-sur-Ajon
- Location within France Location within Normandy
- Coordinates: 49°03′17″N 0°32′15″W
- Country: France
- Region: Normandy
- Department: Calvados
- Arrondissement: Vire
- Canton: Les Monts d'Aunay
- Intercommunality: Pré-Bocage Intercom

Government
  - Mayor (2020–2026): Pierre Dewasne
- Area^{1}: 4.24 km^{2} (1.64 sq mi)
- Elevation: 150 m (490 ft)
- Highest elevation: 196 m (643 ft)
- Lowest elevation: 94 m (308 ft)
- Population (2023): 208
  - Density: 49.1/km^{2} (127/sq mi)
- Time zone: UTC+01:00 (CET)
  - Summer (DST): UTC+02:00 (CEST)
- INSEE/Postal code: 14390 /14210
- ^{1} French Land Register data, which excludes lakes, ponds, glaciers > 1 km^{2} (0.386 sq mi or 247 acres) and river estuaries.

Maisoncelles-sur-Ajon (French pronunciation: [mɛzɔ̃sɛl syʁ aʒɔ̃]) is a commune in the Calvados department in the Normandy region in northwestern France.

== Geography ==
The commune is made up of the following collection of villages and hamlets, Le Mont and Maisoncelles-sur-Ajon.

The river Ajon flows through the commune, in addition two streams the Ruisseau de la Vallee Aubray and the Ruisseau de Buharet also traverse the commune.

== Population ==
Historical population
Year	Pop.	±% p.a.
1968	142	—
1975	166	+2.26%
1982	142	−2.21%
1990	169	+2.20%
1999	182	+0.83%
2007	195	+0.87%
2012	195	+0.00%
2017	189	−0.62%
2023	208	+1.61%
Source: INSEE

== Points of Interest ==
=== National Heritage sites ===
The Commune has two buildings and areas listed as a Monument historique

- Chapelle Saint-Clair a thirteenth century, Gothic style chapel listed as a monument in 1930.

== Twin towns – sister cities ==
Maisoncelles-sur-Ajon, along with eight other communes, Amayé-sur-Orne, Maizet, Montigny, Préaux-Bocage, Avenay, Sainte-Honorine-du-Fay, Vacognes-Neuilly and Montillières-sur-Orne, is a member of The ICL Val Orne, which has organised being twinned with:

- (Germany) Johannesberg, Bavaria.

== See also ==
- Communes of the Calvados department
