= Montillières-sur-Orne =

- Commune
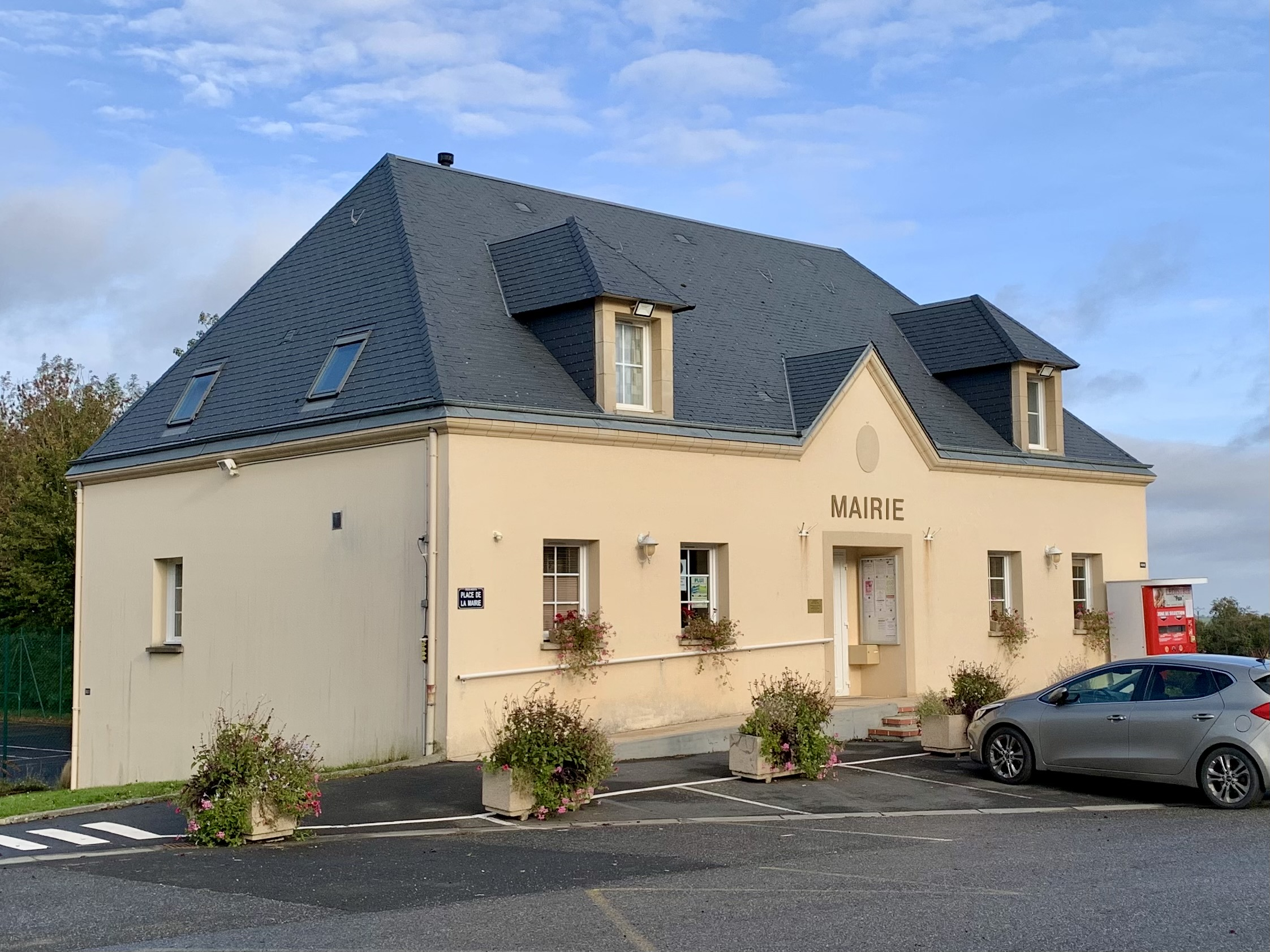
- Town hall
- Location of Montillières-sur-Orne
- Location within France Location within Normandy
- Coordinates: 49°02′49″N 0°28′49″W
- Country: France
- Region: Normandy
- Department: Calvados
- Arrondissement: Caen
- Canton: Le Hom
- Intercommunality: Cingal-Suisse Normande
- Area^{1}: 9.31 km^{2} (3.59 sq mi)
- Highest elevation: 165 m (541 ft)
- Lowest elevation: 12 m (39 ft)
- Population (2023): 557
  - Density: 59.8/km^{2} (155/sq mi)
- Time zone: UTC+01:00 (CET)
  - Summer (DST): UTC+02:00 (CEST)
- INSEE/Postal code: 14713 /14210
- ^{1} French Land Register data, which excludes lakes, ponds, glaciers > 1 km^{2} (0.386 sq mi or 247 acres) and river estuaries.

Montillières-sur-Orne (French pronunciation: [mɔ̃tijɛʁ syʁ ɔʁn], literally Montillières on Orne) is a commune in the Calvados department in northwestern France. The municipality was established on 1 January 2019 by merger of the former communes of Trois-Monts and Goupillières.

== Geography ==
The commune is part of the area known as Suisse Normande.

The commune is made up of the following collection of villages and hamlets, Le Petit Mesnil, Le Val Énault, Les Trois Monteaux, Lignerolles and Goupillières.

The river Orne plus four streams La Vallee Fermante, The Buharet, The Flagy and the Bois are the five watercourses running through the commune.

== Twin towns – sister cities ==
Montillières-sur-Orne, along with eight other communes, Amayé-sur-Orne, Maizet, Montigny, Préaux-Bocage, Maisoncelles-sur-Ajon, Sainte-Honorine-du-Fay, Vacognes-Neuilly and Avenay, is a member of The ICL Val Orne, which has organised being twinned with:

- (Germany) Johannesberg, Bavaria.

== See also ==
- Communes of the Calvados department
