= Maizet =

- Commune
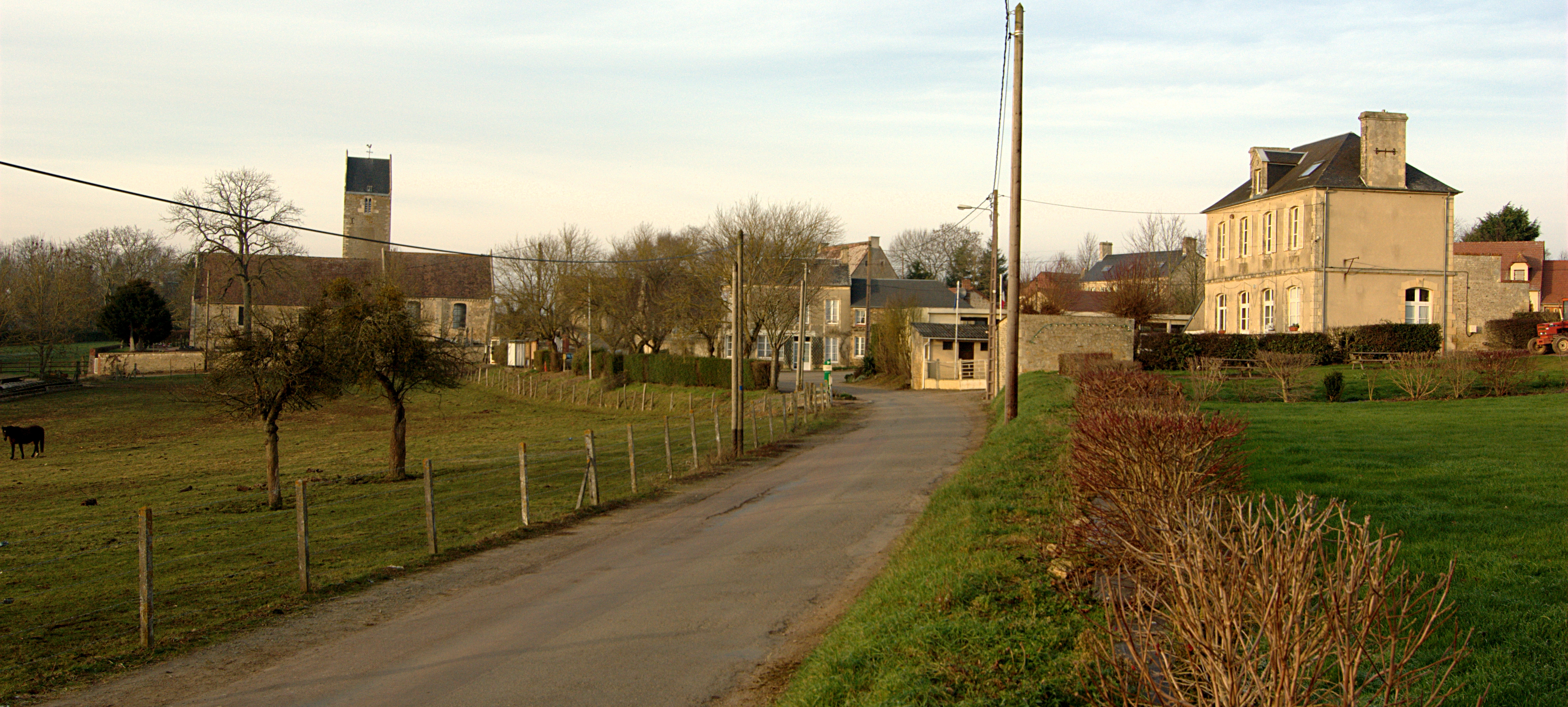
- A general view of Maizet

- Coat of arms
- Location of Maizet
- Location within France Location within Normandy
- Coordinates: 49°04′47″N 0°28′16″W
- Country: France
- Region: Normandy
- Department: Calvados
- Arrondissement: Caen
- Canton: Évrecy

Government
  - Mayor (2020–2026): Gilbert Duval
- Area^{1}: 5.72 km^{2} (2.21 sq mi)
- Elevation: 120 m (390 ft)
- Highest elevation: 120 m (390 ft)
- Lowest elevation: 7 m (23 ft)
- Population (2023): 360
  - Density: 63/km^{2} (160/sq mi)
- Time zone: UTC+01:00 (CET)
  - Summer (DST): UTC+02:00 (CEST)
- INSEE/Postal code: 14393 /14210
- ^{1} French Land Register data, which excludes lakes, ponds, glaciers > 1 km^{2} (0.386 sq mi or 247 acres) and river estuaries.

Maizet (French pronunciation: [mɛzɛ]) is a commune in the Calvados department in the Normandy region in northwestern France.

== Geography ==
The Orne river and the Ruisseau de la Planquette are the two watercourses flowing through the commune.

The commune borders the area known as Suisse Normande.

== Population ==
Historical population
| Year | Pop. | ±% p.a. |
|---|---|---|
| 1968 | 164 | — |
| 1975 | 187 | +1.89% |
| 1982 | 202 | +1.11% |
| 1990 | 260 | +3.21% |
| 1999 | 238 | −0.98% |
| 2007 | 278 | +1.96% |
| 2012 | 321 | +2.92% |
| 2017 | 363 | +2.49% |
| 2023 | 360 | −0.14% |
Source: INSEE

== Twin towns – sister cities ==
Maizet, along with eight other communes, Amayé-sur-Orne, Avenay, Montigny, Préaux-Bocage, Maisoncelles-sur-Ajon, Sainte-Honorine-du-Fay, Vacognes-Neuilly and Montillières-sur-Orne, is a member of The ICL Val Orne, which has organised being twinned with:

- (Germany) Johannesberg, Bavaria.

== See also ==
- Communes of the Calvados department
