= Vacognes-Neuilly =

- Commune
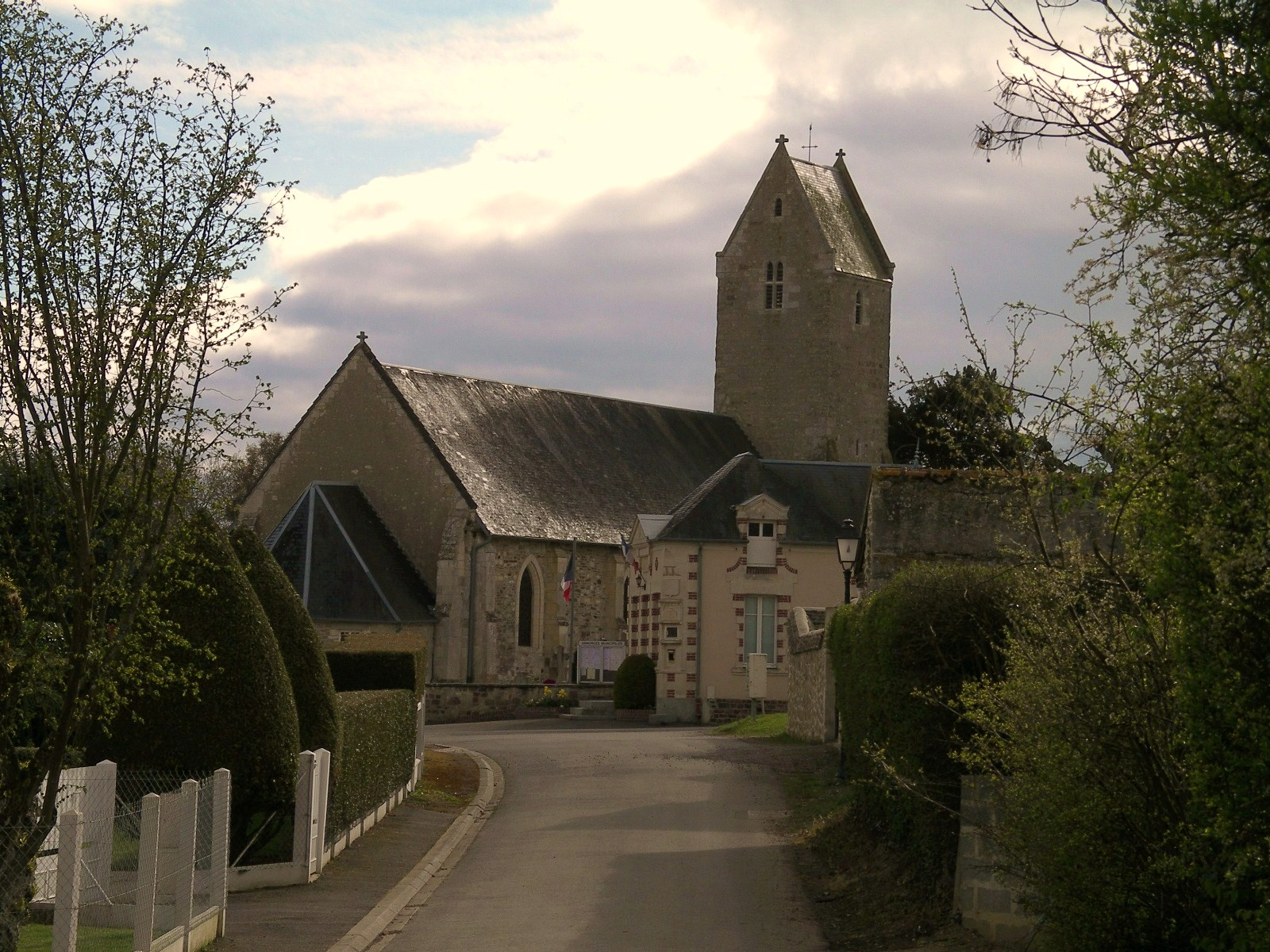
- The church and town hall in Vacognes
- Location of Vacognes-Neuilly
- Location within France Location within Normandy
- Coordinates: 49°04′32″N 0°31′26″W
- Country: France
- Region: Normandy
- Department: Calvados
- Arrondissement: Caen
- Canton: Évrecy
- Intercommunality: Vallées de l'Orne et de l'Odon

Government
  - Mayor (2020–2026): Anne Mancel
- Area^{1}: 7.90 km^{2} (3.05 sq mi)
- Elevation: 134 m (440 ft)
- Highest elevation: 157 m (515 ft)
- Lowest elevation: 63 m (207 ft)
- Population (2023): 681
  - Density: 86.2/km^{2} (223/sq mi)
- Time zone: UTC+01:00 (CET)
  - Summer (DST): UTC+02:00 (CEST)
- INSEE/Postal code: 14721 /14210
- ^{1} French Land Register data, which excludes lakes, ponds, glaciers > 1 km^{2} (0.386 sq mi or 247 acres) and river estuaries.

Vacognes-Neuilly (French pronunciation: [vakɔɲ nøji]) is a commune in the Calvados department in the Normandy region in northwestern France.

== Geography ==
The commune is made up of the following collection of villages and hamlets, Neuilly-le-Malherbe, Le Bois de Verdun and Vacognes.

Two rivers flow through the commune, La Guigne and L'Ajon. In addition two streams the Ruisseau de la Vallee Aubray and the Ruisseau de Verdun traverse the commune.

== Population ==
Historical population
Year	Pop.	±% p.a.
1968	246	—
1975	273	+1.50%
1982	332	+2.83%
1990	414	+2.80%
1999	412	−0.05%
2007	481	+1.95%
2012	512	+1.26%
2017	627	+4.14%
2023	681	+1.39%
Source: INSEE

== Twin towns – sister cities ==
Vacognes-Neuilly, along with eight other communes, Amayé-sur-Orne, Maizet, Montigny, Préaux-Bocage, Maisoncelles-sur-Ajon, Sainte-Honorine-du-Fay, Avenay and Montillières-sur-Orne, is a member of The ICL Val Orne, which has organised being twinned with:

- (Germany) Johannesberg, Bavaria.

== See also ==
- Communes of the Calvados department
