= Canton of Évrecy =

Coordinates: 49.10°N 0.50°W

- Canton
- Situation of the canton of Évrecy in the department of Calvados
- Country: France
- Region: Normandy
- Department: Calvados
- No. of communes: {{{nbcomm}}}
- Population (2023): 36,141
- INSEE code: 1412

The canton of Évrecy is an administrative division of the Calvados department, northwestern France. Its borders were modified at the French canton reorganisation which came into effect in March 2015. Its seat is in Évrecy.

It consists of the following communes:

1. Amayé-sur-Orne
2. Avenay
3. Baron-sur-Odon
4. Bougy
5. Bourguébus
6. La Caine
7. Le Castelet
8. Castine-en-Plaine
9. Esquay-Notre-Dame
10. Évrecy
11. Feuguerolles-Bully
12. Fontaine-Étoupefour
13. Fontenay-le-Marmion
14. Gavrus
15. Grainville-sur-Odon
16. Grentheville
17. Laize-Clinchamps
18. Maizet
19. Maltot
20. Mondrainville
21. Montigny
22. Préaux-Bocage
23. Sainte-Honorine-du-Fay
24. Saint-Martin-de-May
25. Soliers
26. Vacognes-Neuilly
27. Vieux
