= Montigny, Calvados =

Montigny
- Commune
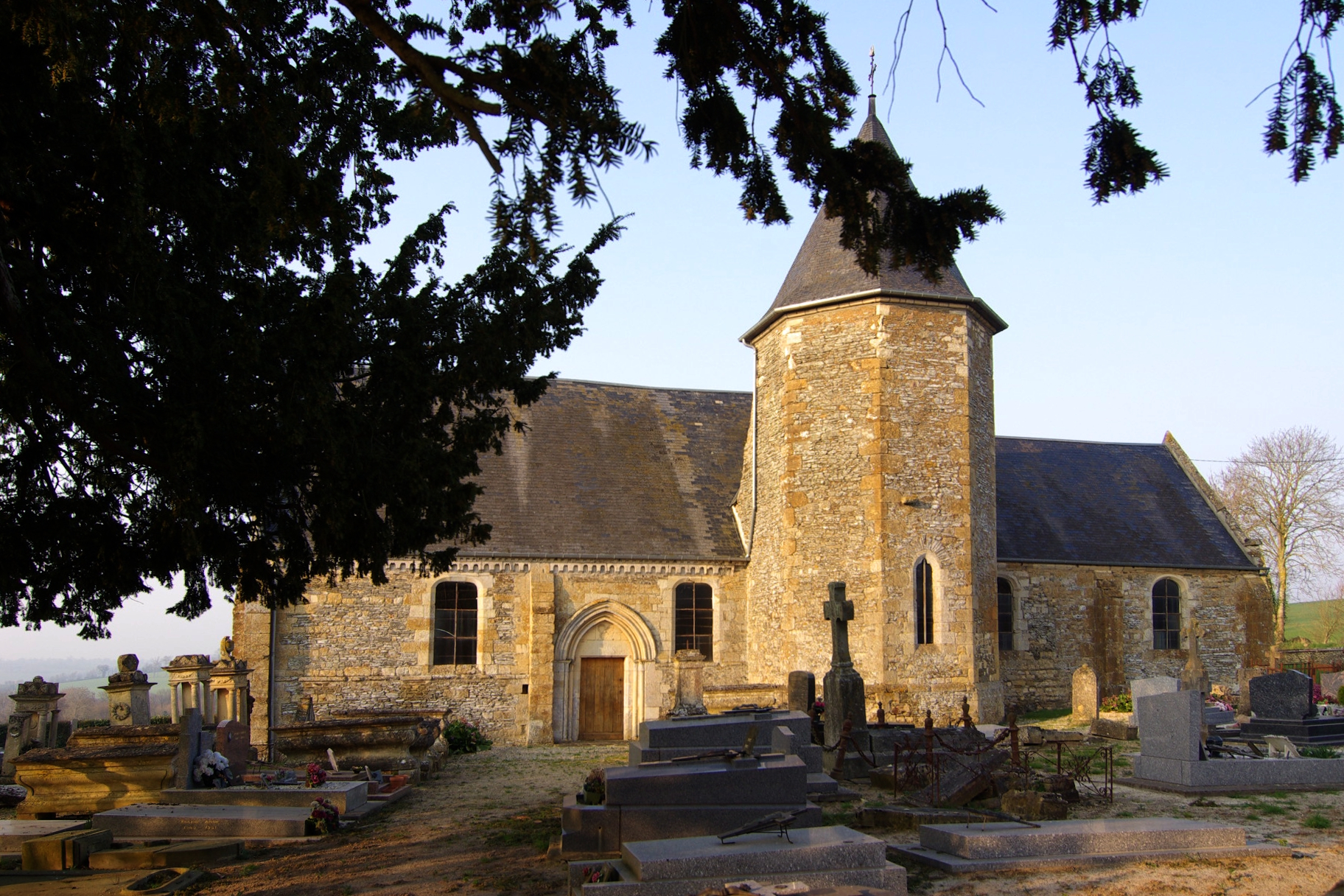
- The church in Montigny
- Location of Montigny
- Location within France Location within Normandy
- Coordinates: 49°02′46″N 0°31′50″W
- Country: France
- Region: Normandy
- Department: Calvados
- Arrondissement: Caen
- Canton: Évrecy

Government
  - Mayor (2020–2026): Romain Massu
- Area^{1}: 3.91 km^{2} (1.51 sq mi)
- Elevation: 139 m (456 ft)
- Highest elevation: 207 m (679 ft)
- Lowest elevation: 112 m (367 ft)
- Population (2023): 86
  - Density: 22/km^{2} (57/sq mi)
- Time zone: UTC+01:00 (CET)
  - Summer (DST): UTC+02:00 (CEST)
- INSEE/Postal code: 14446 /14210
- ^{1} French Land Register data, which excludes lakes, ponds, glaciers > 1 km^{2} (0.386 sq mi or 247 acres) and river estuaries.

Montigny (French pronunciation: [mɔ̃tiɲi]) is a commune in the Calvados department in the Normandy region in northwestern France.

== Geography ==
The commune is made up of the following collection of villages and hamlets, Les Longs Baux, Le Mesnil le Noble and Montigny.

The river Ajon is the only watercourse that flows through the commune.

The commune is on the border of the area known as Suisse Normande.

== Population ==
Historical population
Year	Pop.	±% p.a.
1968	96	—
1975	69	−4.61%
1982	81	+2.32%
1990	71	−1.63%
1999	78	+1.05%
2007	91	+1.95%
2012	96	+1.08%
2017	96	+0.00%
2023	86	−1.82%
Source: INSEE

== Twin towns – sister cities ==
Montigny, along with eight other communes, Amayé-sur-Orne, Maizet, Avenay, Préaux-Bocage, Maisoncelles-sur-Ajon, Sainte-Honorine-du-Fay, Vacognes-Neuilly and Montillières-sur-Orne, is a member of The ICL Val Orne, which has organised being twinned with:

- (Germany) Johannesberg, Bavaria.

== See also ==
- Communes of the Calvados department
