= Préaux-Bocage =

- Commune
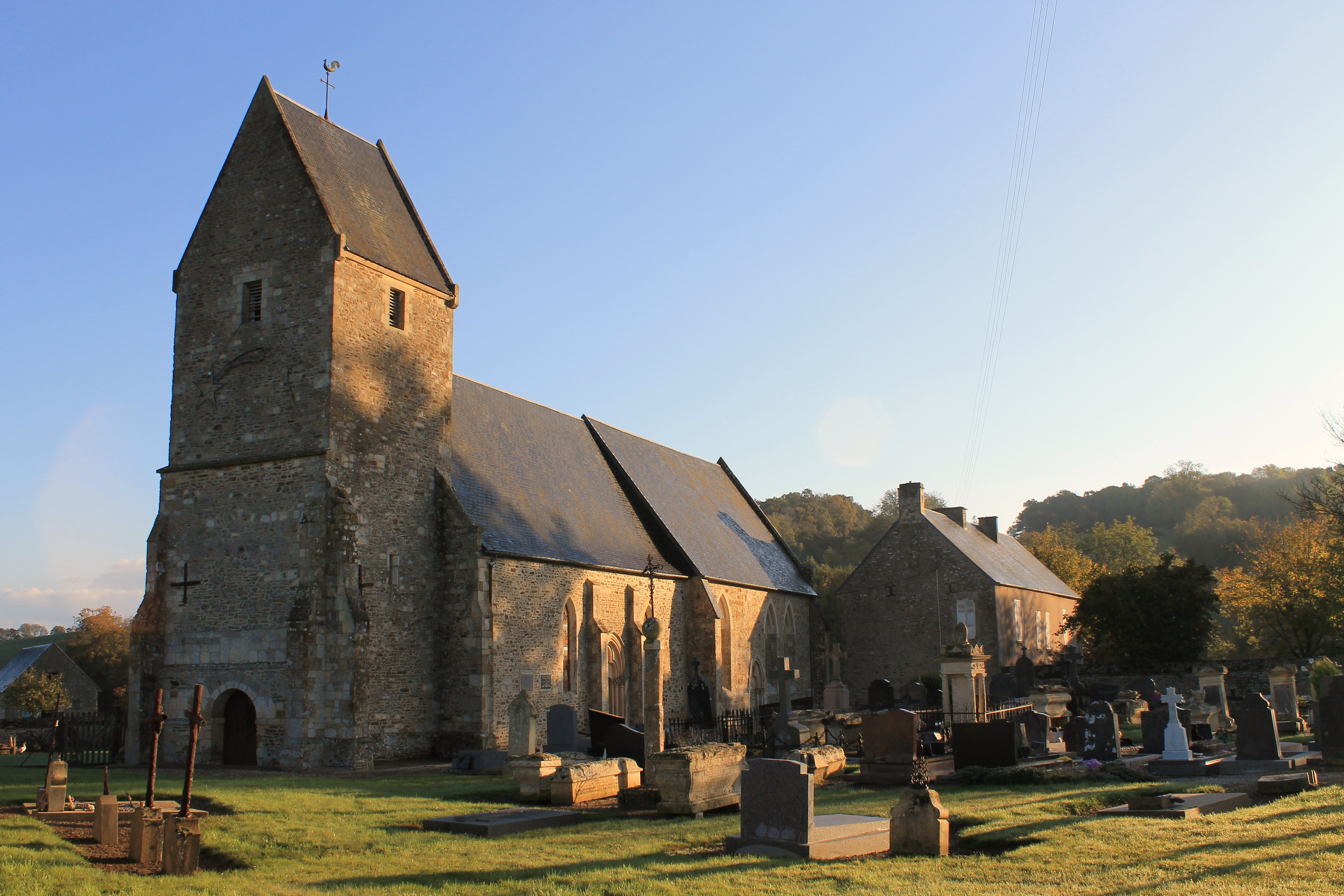
- The church in Préaux-Bocage
- Location of Préaux-Bocage
- Location within France Location within Normandy
- Coordinates: 49°03′25″N 0°31′13″W
- Country: France
- Region: Normandy
- Department: Calvados
- Arrondissement: Caen
- Canton: Évrecy

Government
  - Mayor (2020–2026): Christophe Braud
- Area^{1}: 4.32 km^{2} (1.67 sq mi)
- Elevation: 90 m (300 ft)
- Highest elevation: 173 m (568 ft)
- Lowest elevation: 73 m (240 ft)
- Population (2023): 107
  - Density: 24.8/km^{2} (64.2/sq mi)
- Time zone: UTC+01:00 (CET)
  - Summer (DST): UTC+02:00 (CEST)
- INSEE/Postal code: 14519 /14210
- ^{1} French Land Register data, which excludes lakes, ponds, glaciers > 1 km^{2} (0.386 sq mi or 247 acres) and river estuaries.

Préaux-Bocage (French pronunciation: [pʁeo bɔkaʒ]) is a commune in the Calvados department in the Normandy region in northwestern France.

== Geography ==
Three streams flow through the commune, Ruisseau de Flagy, Ruisseau du Bois and the Ruisseau de Buharet.

The commune is on the border of the area known as Suisse Normande.

== Population ==
Historical population
Year	Pop.	±% p.a.
1968	72	—
1975	91	+3.40%
1982	89	−0.32%
1990	97	+1.08%
1999	112	+1.61%
2007	123	+1.18%
2012	115	−1.34%
2017	123	+1.35%
2023	107	−2.30%
Source: INSEE

== Points of interest ==
=== National heritage sites ===
- Église Saint-Sever is a thirteenth century church which was listed as a Monument historique in 1932.

== Twin towns – sister cities ==
Préaux-Bocage, along with eight other communes, Amayé-sur-Orne, Maizet, Montigny, Avenay, Maisoncelles-sur-Ajon, Sainte-Honorine-du-Fay, Vacognes-Neuilly and Montillières-sur-Orne, is a member of The ICL Val Orne, which has organised being twinned with:

- (Germany) Johannesberg, Bavaria.

== See also ==
- Communes of the Calvados department
