= King's College, Taunton =

School in Taunton, Somerset, England

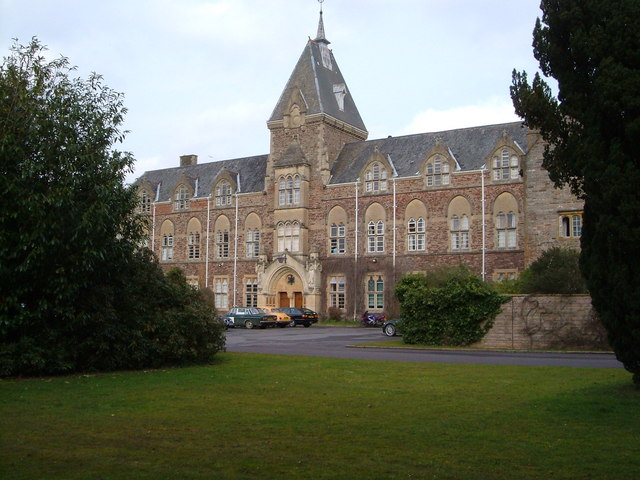

Location
- South Road; Taunton, Somerset, TA1 3LA; United Kingdom; 51.0110°N 3.0960°W

Information
- Motto: Latin: Fortis et Fidelis (Strong and faithful)
- Established: 1880
- Founder: Canon Nathaniel Woodard
- Headmaster: Benjamin Evans
- Gender: Co-educational
- Age: 13 to 18
- Former pupils: Old Aluredians (OAs)
- Affiliation: Woodard Corporation
- Website: www.kings-taunton.co.uk

King's College, Taunton is a private school in Taunton, England, providing co-educational day school and boarding school facilities for 2-to-18-year-olds. Set across two sites, it is surrounded by Somerset countryside.

A member school of the Woodard Corporation, the school has approximately 395 pupils, including about 175 boarders. The associated prep school is King's College Preparatory School. The head of the school is Benjamin Evans, who started his first academic year in the winter of 2026.

King’s College Taunton has several international schools: in Doha, Riyadh and India.

== History ==
King's College, Taunton, or King Alfred's College as it was originally named, was founded in 1880 by Canon Nathaniel Woodard. King's College was the fifth of the Woodard schools to be opened. Woodard purchased the recently built buildings of Taunton Grammar School in South Road when financial difficulties forced the Grammar School to move back to their original site. The buildings had been designed by Charles Edmund Giles under the instructions of the Grammar School's Headmaster William Tuckwell and were built between 1867 and 1869. Maintaining the link with the past, Woodard adopted the pelican badge of Bishop Richard Fox (the Grammar School's founder) as the new King’s crest. Today Bishop Fox and Tuckwell are still names of school Houses and former pupils are known as Old Aluredians (OAs) after King Alfred.

One of the most notable parts of the school is the Chapel, built from 1903 and designed by W. E. Tower with later extensions in 1936 and 1986. The Chapel was the particular project of the school Provost, Prebendary Henry Meynell, who sought the support of benefactors, most notably the former Prime Minister the Marquess of Salisbury. Henry Richards MP bestowed the fine organ formerly in St Michael Bassishaw. The school also had the support of the Gibbs Family of Tyntesfield. H. Martin Gibbs, the school Custos, was responsible for building the Lady Chapel and for donating some fine pieces of devotional art. The main building has been designated as a Grade II listed building.

Benjamin Disraeli stood for MP in Taunton, and many of his early political appearances took place on what is currently the school's 1st XV Rugby pitch. After the Italian invasion of Ethiopia in 1936, Emperor Haile Selassie I fled in exile to Bath. During his stay in the UK his youngest son and eldest grandson went to Kings College, and the Emperor himself distributed awards at Sports Day in 1937. Before the General Election in 1964, the prime minister, Alec Douglas-Home, addressed a public meeting at the school.

Junior pupils (from around eight years of age) were part of the school from 1880. When the school purchased Pyrland Hall in 1952 the Junior School moved to that site. Pyrland Hall was then known as King's Hall School co-educational prep school (now King's College Preparatory School).

The school became co-educational in 1968 (in that it admitted girls into the Sixth Form), becoming fully co-educational in 1991. There are currently seven boarding houses: Bishop Fox, King Alfred, Woodard (After Nathaniel Woodard) Tuckwell (after William Tuckwell, Meynell, Taylor and Carpenter. King Alfred house closed in July 2024, to undergo desperate renovations, it is expected to re-open at a later date. All these houses, plus Neates, King Edward's and Perratt's, which no longer exist, were male boarding houses until 1991, when Meynell converted to become the first all female boarding house. Carpenter became a female boarding house in 1994 and Taylor house was founded as a female boarding house in 1997. Until the conversion to full coeducational status, Sixth-Form girls were assigned to one of the male boarding houses but lived in separate accommodation.

In 2007, the school choir took part in a choral competition on the BBC programme Songs of Praise and came first, and in the same year the senior rugby team were victorious in The National Schools 7's. The school chapel is the venue for an annual concert by the Somerset chamber choir.

== Notable students ==
- Robin Appleford, youngest pilot in the Battle of Britain - 1940
- Laura Bates, author, activist and campaigner
- Neil Brand, South African cricketer.
- Jos Buttler, cricketer; Wicketkeeper-Batsmen and former white ball captain for England plays first class cricket for Lancashire. Was part of the England team that won the 2019 ICC World Cup and captained the team that won the 2022 ICC T20 World Cup.
- Charles Ching, judge
- Tom Banton, Somerset and England cricketer
- Geoffrey Cox, Her Majesty's Attorney General of England and Wales and Advocate General of Northern Ireland, 2018–20, Conservative Member of Parliament
- Richard Harden, first-class cricketer for Somerset
- Calvin Harrison, cricketer
- John Hazan, judge
- Antony Hewish, Nobel Prize in Physics - 1974
- John Keegan, military historian
- Simon Jones, film, stage TV & radio actor, narrator
- Henry Litton, judge
- Christopher Mackenzie-Beevor, courtier
- Jonathan Meades, author and broadcaster
- David Pipe, racehorse trainer
- Geoffrey Rippon, Baron Rippon of Hexham, Conservative Member of Parliament
- Matthew Robinson, rugby player for Wales
- Michael Scott (priest), pioneer campaigner against apartheid
- Juno Temple, actress
- Roger Twose, first-class cricketer for New Zealand
- Ted Nash, English entrepreneur
- Tom Voyce, rugby player for Gloucester Rugby
- Tom Webley, cricketer
- Dominic Wood, CBBC presenter Dick and Dom
- John Eakin, British Blind Open Golf champion - 2011
- The Turner Twins - Hugo & Ross Turner, adventurers
- Maddie Hinch, women's England and Great Britain hockey goalkeeper
- Will Smeed, Somerset county cricket player
- James Rew, Somerset County Cricket player
- Thomas Rew , England Under-19 Cricket Captain in ICC Under-19 World Cup 2026
