= King's College Preparatory School =

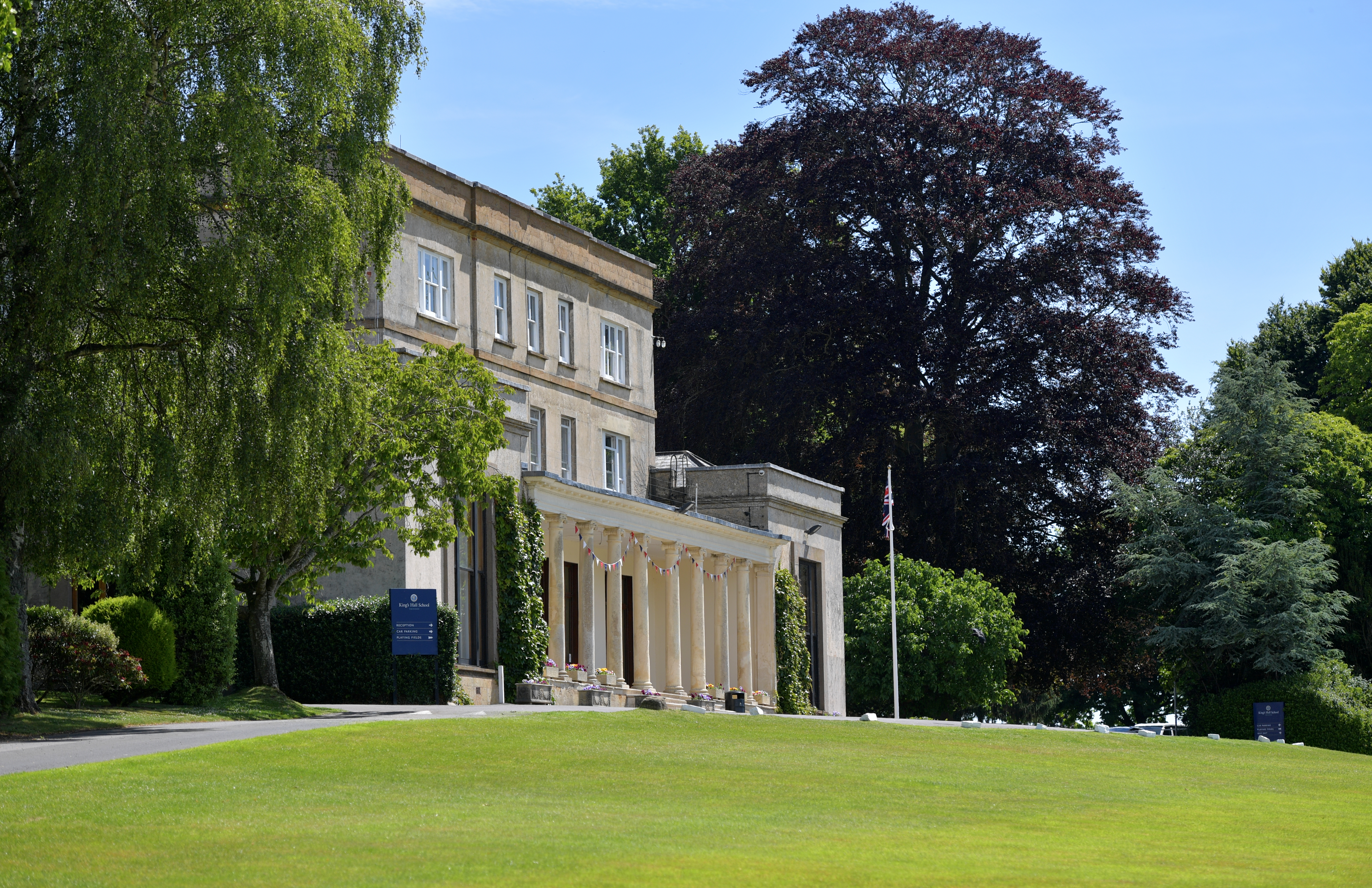

Location
- Kingston Road; Taunton, Somerset, TA2 8AA; England; 51.0428°N 3.1034°W

Information
- Type: Preparatory day and boarding school
- Motto: Latin: Fortis et Fidelis (Strong and faithful)
- Religious affiliation: Church of England
- Established: 1987
- Department for Education URN: 123934 Tables
- Headmistress: Heidi Berry
- Gender: Co-educational
- Age: 2 to 13
- Enrolment: 265
- Colours: Red, dark blue, gold
- Affiliation: Woodard Corporation
- Website: http://www.kings-taunton.co.uk/

King's College Preparatory School is a co-educational day and boarding preparatory school. The school is located within the parish of Cheddon Fitzpaine, just north of Taunton, Somerset, in the West of England. It is housed in the Grade II listed building Pyrland Hall. It was named King's Hall School after Pyrland Hall joined with King's House.

== History ==
King's Prep was originally the boys Junior House of King's College, Taunton, and remains a partner school. Both are Woodard Schools which means they are part of a group of Anglican schools (both primary and secondary) affiliated to the Woodard Corporation (formerly the Society of St Nicolas) which has its origin in the work of Nathaniel Woodard, an Anglo-Catholic clergyman. Since it was established in 1953, the school has been housed in Pyrland Hall.

Pyrland Hall School, as it was previously known, was a boys' preparatory school (ages 8–13) that amalgamated with King's House, a girl's preparatory school, which also had a pre-preparatory unit, to form King's Hall School in 1987. In September 2023, the school changed its name from King's Hall School to King's College Prep School.

== Leadership ==
In 2010, Magnus Mowat, the chair of the school's governors was given the award Independent School Governor of the Year.

In September 2025, Heidi Berry replaced Justin Chippendale as headteacher.
