= Appleford (surname) =

Appleford is an English surname. Notable people with this name include:

- Alexander Appleford, RAF pilot
- Alice Appleford, Australian nurse
- Geoff Appleford, South African rugby union player
- Henry of Appleford, English monk
- Patrick Appleford, English Anglican priest and hymnwriter
