= Fitzpaine =

Fitzpaine may refer to:

- Cheddon Fitzpaine, a village and civil parish in Somerset, England
- Cheriton Fitzpaine, a village in Devon, England
- Okeford Fitzpaine, a village and civil parish in the English county of Dorset in South West England
- Staple Fitzpaine, a village and civil parish in Somerset, England
- Wootton Fitzpaine, a village and civil parish in the county of Dorset in South West England
