= Somerset Chamber Choir =

- Also known as: SCC
- Origin: Somerset, England, United Kingdom
- Genre: Classical
- Years active: 1984 -present
- Website: www.somersetchamberchoir.org

Somerset Chamber Choir is a choir based in the county of Somerset, England.

The choir was formed in 1984 by former members of Somerset Youth Choir, and typically gives two concerts annually. Initially, these were mainly around Taunton, but in July 1992 the choir gave it first Wells Cathedral concert. Since 1994, the choir has staged an annual concert with professional orchestra and soloists at Wells Cathedral every summer, with another at King's College Chapel, Taunton earlier in the year, plus occasional other performances around Somerset and beyond, including a trip to Berlin in 2013 when they joined Berliner Kantorei to sing Haydn’s Creation.

Andrea Brown took on the role as the choir's musical director in autumn 2023, succeeding Richard Laing, who was the choir's musical director from autumn 2017 to summer 2023. Before Richard Laing, Graham Caldbeck held the post for the previous 26 years and was made conductor emeritus in 2017. Dame Emma Kirkby is Patron of the choir, and has performed with the choir on six occasions, the first being in Bach's St John Passion in King's College Chapel, Taunton in 1988, and most recently in Taunton Minster in a programme entitled 'The Private Music - Renaissance Music of Utter Beauty and Calm' in February 2024 - also Andrea's first concert with the choir.

Throughout the years, the choir has often enjoyed collaboration with the Southern Sinfonia, their most recent concert together including Fauré's Requiem and the Poulenc Organ Concerto.

The choir will next perform in Wells Cathedral on Saturday 1 August with a programme entitled Sacred Shadows, Eternal Light, featuring music celebrating the great composers who lived and worked in Leipzig, a city at the heart of musical inspiration.

== See also ==
- Wells Cathedral
