= Fontaine-Étoupefour =

- Commune
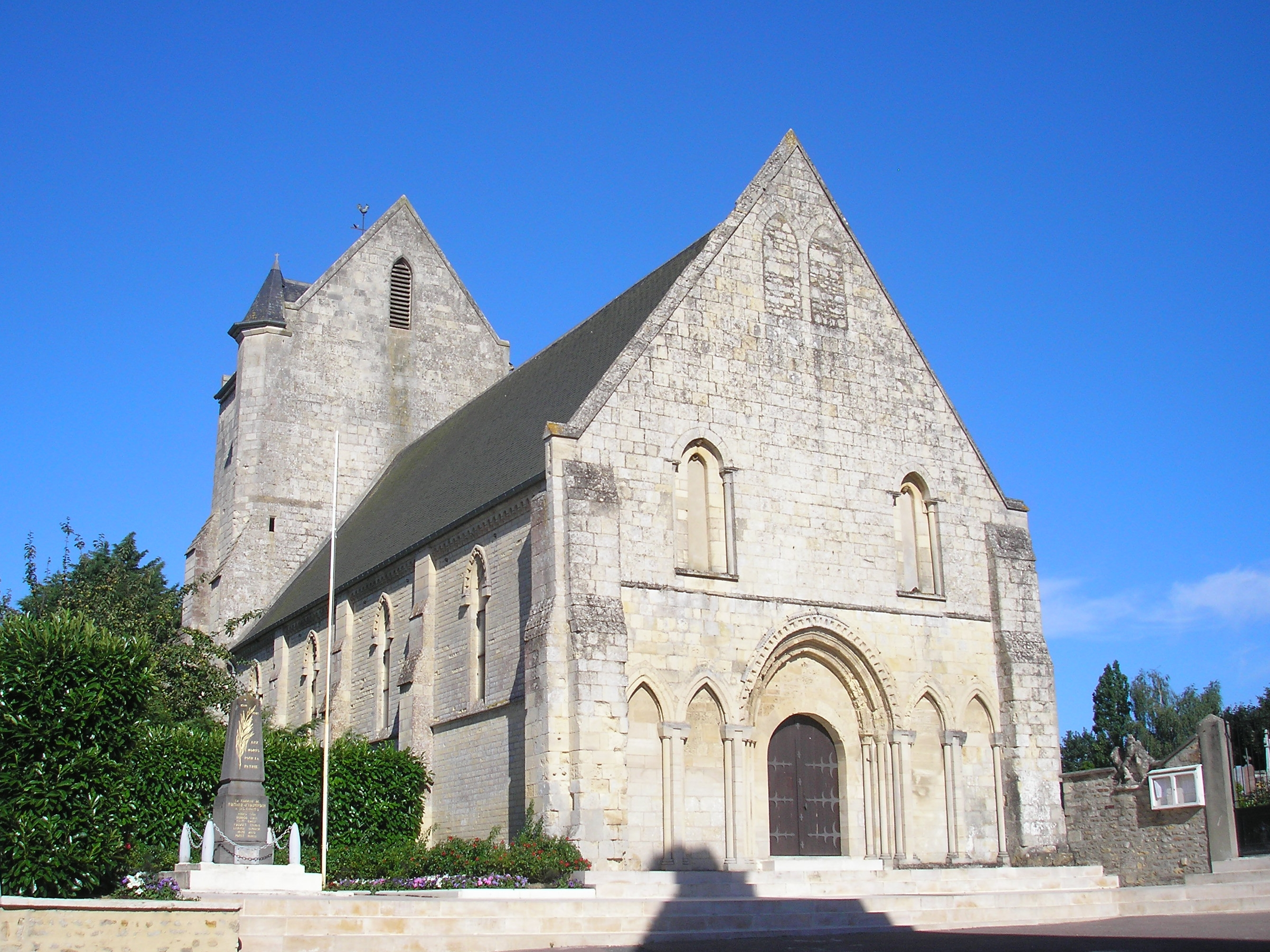
- St. Pierre Church
- Location of Fontaine-Étoupefour
- Location within France Location within Normandy
- Coordinates: 49°08′49″N 0°27′10″W
- Country: France
- Region: Normandy
- Department: Calvados
- Arrondissement: Caen
- Canton: Évrecy
- Intercommunality: Vallées de l'Orne et de l'Odon

Government
  - Mayor (2020–2026): Bernard Énault
- Area^{1}: 5.08 km^{2} (1.96 sq mi)
- Elevation: 32 m (105 ft)
- Highest elevation: 111 m (364 ft)
- Lowest elevation: 19 m (62 ft)
- Population (2023): 2,810
  - Density: 553/km^{2} (1,430/sq mi)
- Time zone: UTC+01:00 (CET)
  - Summer (DST): UTC+02:00 (CEST)
- INSEE/Postal code: 14274 /14790
- ^{1} French Land Register data, which excludes lakes, ponds, glaciers > 1 km^{2} (0.386 sq mi or 247 acres) and river estuaries.

Fontaine-Étoupefour (French pronunciation: [fɔ̃tɛn etupfuʁ]) is a commune in the Calvados department in the Normandy region in northwestern France.

== Geography ==
The commune is made up of the following collection of villages and hamlets, Les Salles, Les Daims and Fontaine-Étoupefour.

The river the Odon is the only watercourse running through the commune.

== Population ==
Historical population

Year	Pop.	±% p.a.
1793	491	—
1800	490	−0.03%
1806	642	+4.61%
1821	591	−0.55%
1831	662	+1.14%
1836	668	+0.18%
1841	666	−0.06%
1846	640	−0.79%
1851	662	+0.68%
1856	631	−0.95%
1861	628	−0.10%
1866	604	−0.78%
1872	526	−2.28%
1876	530	+0.19%
1881	517	−0.50%
1886	468	−1.97%
1891	461	−0.30%
1896	426	−1.57%
1901	404	−1.05%

Year	Pop.	±% p.a.
1906	406	+0.10%
1911	337	−3.66%
1921	290	−1.49%
1926	283	−0.49%
1931	284	+0.07%
1936	286	+0.14%
1946	301	+0.51%
1954	359	+2.23%
1962	465	+3.29%
1968	590	+4.05%
1975	960	+7.20%
1982	1,152	+2.64%
1990	1,627	+4.41%
1999	1,676	+0.33%
2007	1,898	+1.57%
2012	2,080	+1.85%
2017	2,348	+2.45%
2023	2,810	+3.04%

Source: EHESS and INSEE (1968-2023)

== Points of interest ==
- Hill 112 Memorial site - is built in recognition of the 10,000 men who lost their lives in the 10 week battle for this strategically important hill as part of Operation Epsom and Operation Jupiter (1944). The memorial is shared across 3 communes whose borders all meet near the top of the hill, so in addition to Fontaine-Étoupefour, there is Esquay-Notre-Dame and Vieux. The memorial features a restored A22 Churchill Mk VII tank a 25-pounder Gun and 112 trees planted to form a cross.

=== National Heritage Sites ===
The commune has two sites listed as a Monument historique.

- Eglise Saint-Pierre a twelfth century church listed as monuments in 1927.
- Château a fifteenth century chateau listed as a monument in 1995.

== See also ==
- Communes of the Calvados department
