= Operation Jupiter (1944) =

1944 British offensive during WWII

- Part of the Battle for Caen
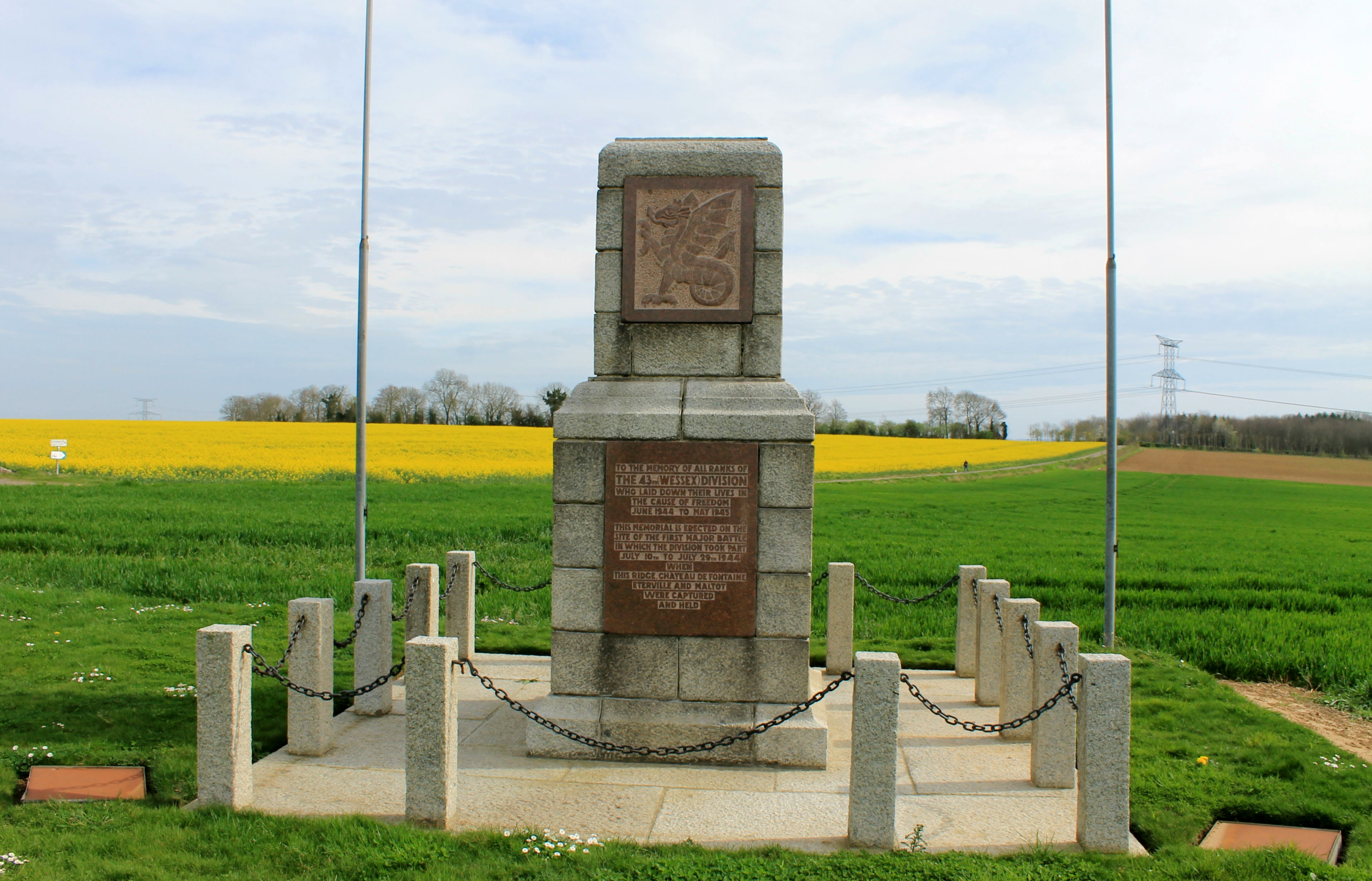
- Memorial to the 43rd (Wessex) Division on Hill 112.
Date	10–11 July 1944
Location	West of Caen, Normandy, France 49°7′25″N 0°27′36″W
Result	British victory

Belligerents
United Kingdom	Germany

Commanders and leaders
Richard O'Connor	Wilhelm Bittrich

Units involved
VIII Corps	II SS Panzer Corps

Casualties and losses
c. 2,000 casualties (43rd Division only); 58 tanks	

Operation Jupiter was an offensive by VIII Corps of the British Second Army from 10 to 11 July 1944 during the Battle of Normandy in the Second World War. The objective of the 43rd (Wessex) Infantry Division (Major-General Ivor Thomas) was to capture the villages of Baron-sur-Odon, Fontaine-Étoupefour, Château de Fontaine-Étoupefour and to capture the high ground of Hill 112 in order to deny its use as an observation point. An attached brigade of the 15th (Scottish) Infantry Division would take Éterville, Maltot and the ground up to the River Orne and then the tanks of the 4th Armoured Brigade, supported by infantry, would advance through the captured ground and secure several villages to the west of the River Orne. It was hoped that the initial objectives could be captured by 9:00 a.m., after which the 4th Armoured Brigade would exploit the success.

The British advance went well at first but fighting for Hill 112 took all day and Maltot changed hands several times. On 11 July, counter-attacks by the 9th SS Panzer Division Hohenstaufen, 10th SS Panzer Division Frundsberg and the schwere-SS Panzer Bataillon 102 (102nd SS Heavy Panzer Battalion) in the afternoon, forced the British off the top of Hill 112 to positions on the north-facing slope. The operation was a tactical failure for VIII Corps but a strategic success for the Allies, attrition having reduced the II SS Panzer Corps to a condition from which it never recovered. British operations of the Second Battle of the Odon conducted in the Odon valley continued in July and the 53rd (Welsh) Infantry Division occupied Hill 112 almost unopposed on 4 August, after the Germans withdrew during Operation Cobra and Operation Bluecoat further west. A stone memorial to the 43rd (Wessex) Infantry Division was built on the hill in the late 1940s.

== Background ==
=== Operation Epsom ===
The first battle for Hill 112 was fought at the end of Operation Epsom, when the tanks of 11th Armoured Division broke out from a bridgehead established by the 2nd Battalion, Argyll and Sutherland Highlanders, part of 227th (Highland) Infantry Brigade 15th (Scottish) Infantry Division, at Tourmauville. Hill 112 was an intermediate objective on the way to the River Orne crossings but such was the German reaction, that the 23rd Hussars were only able to capture and hold the hill with difficulty. Hill 112, at the end of a narrow salient, was held by the infantry of the 8th Battalion, Rifle Brigade (Prince Consort's Own). Here they remained under shell and mortar fire until Ultra decryption of German radio traffic, showed that the II SS Panzer Corps was arriving. Before the German reinforcements could attack, General Bernard Montgomery ordered a withdrawal from the hilltop. Montgomery intended to hold the Panzer divisions (approximately seven), on the British-Canadian front, while the First US Army continued the Battle of Cherbourg and broke out from the beachhead. The American objective was feasible, because they had only the equivalent of 1 1/2 panzer divisions facing them, despite German attempts to disengage panzer units from the east end of the bridgehead.

=== Operation Charnwood ===
Operation Charnwood took place from 8 to 9 July, to capture Caen and prevent the transfer of German armoured units from the Anglo-Canadian front in the east to the American sector. Three infantry divisions supported by three armoured brigades, attacked behind a creeping barrage and made gradual progress against the 12th SS Panzer Division Hitlerjugend and the 16th Luftwaffe Field Division. By the end of the day the 3rd Canadian Division, the British 3rd Infantry Division and the 59th (Staffordshire) Infantry Division had reached Caen. At dawn, the attackers met the rearguards of German units which were retreating across the Orne; Carpiquet airfield had fallen to the Canadians during the morning and by 6:00 p.m., the British and Canadians had secured the north bank of the Orne. With the remaining bridges fortified or impassable and with German reserves close by, the British I Corps ended the operation. Charnwood was mutually costly but a tactical success for the Allies. The Germans were expelled from north of the Orne but established a defensive line south of the city and continued to transfer formations to the American front.

== Prelude ==
=== British plan ===
The intent of the operation was to capture the bridges over the Orne near Feuguerolles to provide a bridgehead for the Second Army to attack over the open ground to Bretteville-sur-Laize and Falaise. The 43rd (Wessex) Infantry Division (Major-General Ivor Thomas) which had arrived in Normandy in time to play a supporting role in Operation Epsom, would capture the spur running eastwards from Hill 112 to the confluence of the Odon and Orne rivers. The 129th Infantry Brigade would capture the top of the hill and establish observation posts as the 130th Infantry Brigade took the lower ground to the south-east of Hill 112. The infantry brigades were to be supported by Churchill tanks of the 31st Tank Brigade and flame-throwing Churchill Crocodiles of the 141st Regiment Royal Armoured Corps (141st RAC) from the 79th Armoured Division. The 4th Armoured Brigade with the 214th Infantry Brigade would exploit success by forming a bridgehead on the east side of the Orne but the use of troop-carriers was cancelled. The 46th (Highland) Infantry Brigade of the 15th (Scottish) Infantry Division was placed under the command of the 43rd (Wessex) Infantry Division to capture Verson and Éterville and the land between the confluence of the Odon and Orne. The Highland Brigade would then advance either side of the Odon to the Orne as a flank guard s the 129th Infantry Brigade guarded the right flank on Hill 112.

==== Artillery plan ====
The attacking brigades were to be supported by the divisional artilleries of the 43rd (Wessex) Infantry Division, 11th Armoured Division, 15th (Scottish) Infantry Division and the 53rd (Welsh) Infantry Division. The medium and heavy guns of the 3rd Army Group Royal Artillery (AGRA), 8th AGRA and part of the 5th AGRA, the corps artillery of XXX Corps, to the west. Thirteen field gun regiments, ten medium gun regiments and 2½ heavy regiments were to participate - three hundred and twelve 25-pounder howitzer-field guns, a hundred and sixty 4.5-inch and 5.5-inch medium guns, twenty-four 155 mm 'Long Tom' heavy field guns and sixteen 7.2-inch heavy howitzers. The battleship HMS Rodney with nine 16-inch guns, the monitor HMS Roberts with two 15-inch guns and the light cruiser HMS Belfast with twelve 6-inch guns in the Bay of the Seine were to contribute their firepower. The army artillery amounted to 512 pieces and the naval contribution was 23 medium and super-heavy guns. The heavy 4.2-inch mortars of the 8th Middlesex and the 3-inch mortar of the infantry were to participate and Hawker Typhoon fighter-bombers were to operate over the German-occupied roads leading to the area.

=== German dispositions ===
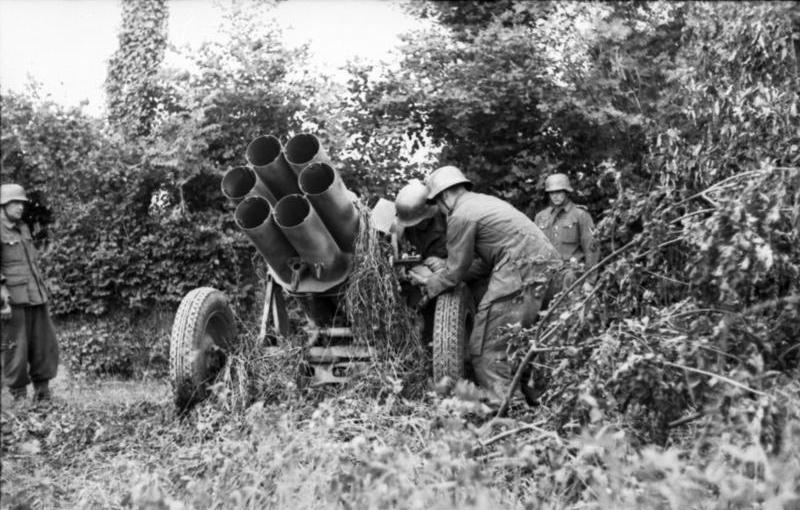
15 cm Nebelwerfer 41 in France

Hill 112 was held by the 10th SS Panzer Division Frundsberg with SS-Panzer-Grenadier-Regiment 21 on the hill, SS-Panzer-Grenadier-Regiment 22 between the hill and the Orne and SS-Panzer-Regiment 10 in reserve with the Tiger tanks of schwere SS-Panzerabteilung 102 (SS Heavy Panzer Battalion). The German defences comprised a line of outposts down the north slope of Hill 112 with a main line of resistance along the Caen–Évrecy road. A second line ran from Feuguerolles westwards from the Orne to Bully, Avenay and Évrecy and another outpost line ran through St Martin; another main line of resistance from Bully to Amayé sur Orne to Évrecy. The Orne crossings were held by the pioneer and reconnaissance battalions and artillery support was provided by the 10th SS Artillery Regiment and the 8th Werfer Brigade. When the 3rd Canadian Division took Carpiquet on 9 July, the Germans lost observation westwards over the south-eastern slope of Hill 112 but could still observe from positions further east across the Orne.

== Battle ==
Operation Jupiter began from the Odon bridgehead, which ran from Verson to Baron, after the 214th Brigade crossed the river during the night of 8/9 July. After a preliminary bombardment the first battalions of the 43rd (Wessex) Infantry Division reached Éterville and the north slope of Hill 112 by 8:00 a.m. and the advance to Maltot began. The village was entered but determined German defenders, mortar-fire and armoured counter-attacks made the British position in the village untenable, without control of Hill 112. The German defenders on the hill were dug into cornfields and tanks were hidden in copses. The Germans stopped the advance of 5th Somerset Light Infantry and C Squadron 7 RTR at the Caen–Évrecy road and below the crest on the flanks. In the evening the 5th Battalion, Duke of Cornwall's Light Infantry (5th DCLI) of 214th Brigade and A Squadron 7th Royal Tank Regiment (7th RTR) attacked the hill and reached the hilltop and woods nearby, which brought the four 43rd (Wessex) Infantry Division brigades onto the ridge. To the north of Éterville, troops of the 3rd Canadian Division had crossed the Odon and extended the salient to the east.

Topography of the area south-west of Caen

German counter-attacks began around midnight and got into Éterville several times; on the hill, the 5th DCLI was forced back to the Caen–Évrecy road, after all its anti-tanks guns were destroyed and it suffered 240 casualties. During the battle, General Heinrich Eberbach, the commander of Panzergruppe West had made the defence of Hill 112 the priority (Schwerpunkt) of the II SS Panzer Corps but the British advance had taken the north slope and got half-way across the hilltop. The German defenders had been subject to naval bombardment, air attack and artillery fire but held much of their ground, with the support of Tiger tanks of schwere SS-Panzer Abteilung 102, which had arrived in Normandy two days previous. (Note: A tank of the Royal Scots Greys hit a Panther four times at 800 yd (730 m) and the shells bounced off.)

== Aftermath ==
=== Analysis ===
Exploitation of a German retirement from Caen after Operation Charnwood had not been possible, since the Germans only withdrew to the south bank of the Orne. The British had attacked up open slopes to reach the top of Hill 112, commanded by dug in German units and tanks on the reverse slope. Narrow front attacks were tactically unwise but lack of troops and force of circumstances had made them unavoidable, despite congestion behind the British front line and the delays this caused in delivering supplies and reinforcements. Lieutenant-General Richard O'Connor, the VIII Corps commander, recommended that more account be taken of topography in the selection of objectives and that the occupation of high ground be favoured over attacks on villages. The British and Canadians had used their increasing experience and kept the initiative but the Germans had not withdrawn, despite the cost of such defensive operations. The commanding views from Hill 112 were of great tactical importance but the highest point of the hill was relinquished by the British and left as a no-man's-land, with the opponents dug in on either side.

Several villages in the vicinity had been taken (although the British were pushed out of Éterville) and the Germans had been provoked into counter-attacking British penetrations. The 9th SS Panzer Division, which had been moving out of the line to form an operational reserve, was brought back to contain the attack and the Germans were exposed to Allied naval and ground artillery and attack from the air, which inflicted severe casualties and deprived the German defence of the ability to conduct a counter-offensive. Tank-versus-tank engagements continued to take place at less than 1,000 yd (910 m), at which the 150 mm (5.9 in) frontal armour of Churchill tanks was insufficient to resist hand-held hollow-charge weapons or the German high-velocity 75 mm and 88 mm anti-tank guns. British tank-mounted, medium-velocity 75 mm guns could not penetrate the frontal armour of a Panther or the armour of a Tiger from any direction.

=== Casualties ===
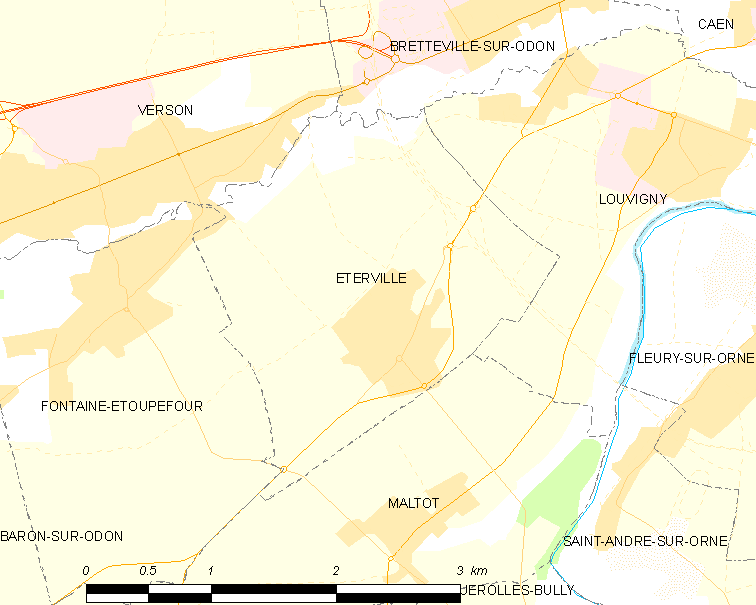
The Éterville area

The 43rd (Wessex) Division suffered 2,000 casualties in the operation and 7,000 casualties from 10 to 22 July. The 31st Tank Brigade lost 39 tanks, some 25 per cent of its establishment. The 9th SS Panzer Division suffered 746 casualties from 2 to 18 July; had 19 operational Panzer IV, 50 Panthers and 25 StuG III on 9 July, 20 Panzer IV, 50 Panthers and 27 StuG III on 10 July and 13 Panzer IV, 35 Panthers and twelve StuG III on 12 July. The 10th SS Panzer Division suffered 403 men killed, 1,263 men wounded and 470 missing in July; had 27 Panzer IV and 25 StuG III operational on 9 July; 17 Panzer IV and eight StuGs on 12 July. schwere-SS Panzer Bataillon 102 had 25 operational Tiger tanks when it went into action on 9 July, 14 on 11 July and ten a day later.

=== Commemoration ===
The importance of the battles for Hill 112 is remembered by the erection by the 5th DCLI in August 1944 of a memorial labelled Cornwall Wood. A larger wooden memorial to the 43rd (Wessex) Division was built by the residents of Normandy to the combatants and civilians who were killed soon afterwards. A stone memorial was built at Hill 112 by the 43rd (Wessex) Infantry Division in the late 1940s (carved by German masons) and similar memorials are at Wynyard's Gap in North Dorset, Castle Hill, Mere in Wiltshire and Rough Tor in Cornwall. In Vieux there is a memorial to the 10,000 men that lost their lives during the battles to get control of the hill featuring a Churchill tank, 25-pounder field gun and 112 trees planted to form a cross.

=== Subsequent operations ===
==== 11 July ====
At dusk on 11 July, the 4th Battalion, Somerset Light Infantry (SLI) of the 129th Infantry Brigade made a silent attack on the crest of Hill 112. D Company attacked in the centre to re-occupy the orchard with A Company on the right and C Company on the left. (Note: A silent attack was a stealthy infantry advance without artillery support until the defenders discovered that they were being attacked.) A Company crossed the Caen–Évrecy road and tried to dig in but found the ground too hard for their tools and then the Germans were alerted by British machine-gun fire. D Company got to the edge of Cornwall Wood where they received machine-gun fire much of which ricochetted from derelict tanks; one platoon strayed to the right and disappeared. Troops of the 19th SS Panzergrenadier Regiment discovered the advance and managed to repulse the British, then found that the German troops on the other side of the orchard had retired. Constant artillery, mortar and machine-gun fire swept the top of Hill 112 and made it untenable for either side and positions below the crest, where troops could assemble for an attack, were frequently bombarded. Small parties of the 5th DCLI remained in the orchard, not having heard of the retirement and after four days, a group which sent four German prisoners down the hill were ordered to retire.

==== Operation Greenline 15–17 July ====
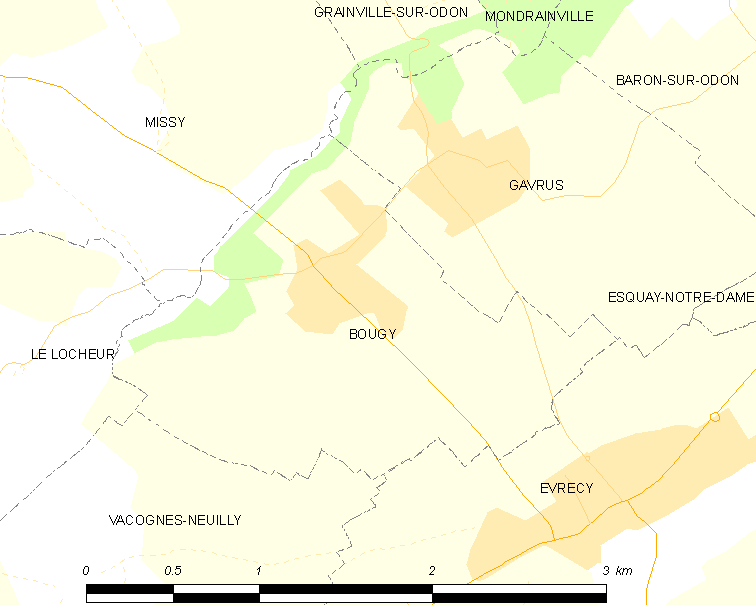
The XII Corps area

The crossroads at le Bon Repos and the higher ground overlooking Esquay-Notre-Dame were attacked by the 2nd Battalion, Glasgow Highlanders of the 227th Infantry Brigade, supported by Churchill tanks of the 107th Regiment Royal Armoured Corps (107th RAC) from the 34th Tank Brigade and the 141st RAC of the 79th Armoured Division, with Churchill Armoured Vehicle Royal Engineers (AVRE) and Churchill Crocodile flame-thrower tanks. The Highlanders advanced from the north-east of Hill 112, south-westwards over the northern slope, towards the defences of the III Battalion, 21st SS-Panzergrenadier Regiment. As the infantry emerged from dead ground they were met by massed mortar fire, which temporarily disorganised the battalion, as did a smoke screen placed on Hill 112, which had merged with fog and covered the area. The Highlanders managed to cross the start line on time at 9:30 p.m. and captured the SS survivors of a flame attack by the Crocodiles on the Caen–Évrecy road, between Croix des Filandriers and le Bon Repos. The advance continued downhill under Monty's Moonlight (illumination from searchlight beams reflected by clouds) and covering fire from the 107th RAC Churchills on the higher ground just south of Baron.

Esquay was raided around 11:00 p.m. but not held, as its position below a saucer of higher ground made it a shell-trap. The troops dug in on the rises north of Esquay at positions determined earlier using reconnaissance photographs. Tiger tanks of schwere SS-Panzer Abteilung 102 were sent up the southern slope of Hill 112 to repulse an attack that never came. Further west, the rest of the 15th (Scottish) Division had captured Point 113 but not Évrecy, which left the 2nd Glasgow Highlanders overlooked from both flanks. German counter-attacks by infantry of the 21st SS-Panzergrenadier Regiment and tanks of the 10th SS-Panzer Regiment at first concentrated on Esquay, which had already been evacuated. The German counter-attack then fell on the positions around le Bon Repos, where two Panzer IV were knocked out by 6-pounder anti-tank guns. The Scottish were pushed back several times, only for the medium artillery of XII Corps to force the Germans back out. On 18 July, the 107th RAC skirmished with dug‑in Tigers and two 88 mm self-propelled guns, losing four tanks on the ridge. The Highlanders maintained their positions for two days before being relieved by a battalion of the 53rd (Welsh) Infantry Division.

==== Operation Express, 22 July ====
Operation Express was to jump-off from the village of Louvigny. The 5th Battalion, Wiltshire Regiment (5th Wilts), of the 129th Infantry Brigade, and B Squadron of the 9th RTR from the 31st Tank Brigade, were to capture the village and orchards north of the road from Louvigny; the 4th Wilts with A Squadron, 9th RTR were to attack the woods, orchards and a spur south-east of Maltot. The 4th Somerset Light Infantry (SLI) were kept in reserve, ready to exploit any success. On the east bank of the Orne, the 5th Canadian Infantry Brigade, 2nd Canadian Division raided Etavaux with two companies moving along the railway close to the river, supported by a creeping barrage and tanks from the Sherbrooke Fusiliers on higher ground. Several Canadian soldiers rushed German machine-gun nests and enabled the advance to continue to the village, where they fought with the German garrison until the British barrage was due and then retired. After Maltot was captured, the Canadians returned to occupy the village and took c. 100 prisoners from the 272nd Infantry Division, for a loss of 108 casualties.

Operation Express began at 5:30 p.m. and the 5th Wilts advanced behind a smoke screen and an artillery barrage on the right side of the road. The Germans were surprised and at first were stunned by the bombardment. As the British moved through the village, some defenders recovered and hand-to-hand fighting took place. Grenadiers from the 10th SS-Panzer Division and Tiger tanks from the schwere SS-Panzer Abteilung 102 began a counter-attack as the British entered Maltot and knocked out several Churchills of B Squadron. A British Forward Air Controller saw the German tanks and called in Typhoon Fighter-bombers which forced the Tigers back to Hill 112, while the grenadiers reinforced the German infantry in the village. On the other side of the Louvigny road, the 4th Wilts advanced with A Squadron, through woods and farms to the final objective south of the village. The infantry went first, two sections in front of each tank, with the squadron commander on foot, accompanying the infantry commanders.

When the 5th Wilts saw that the 4th Wilts across the road had been delayed by the garrison in Lieu de France Farm at the east end of Maltot, Churchill and Churchill Crocodile tanks advanced, bombarded and flamed the defenders and then overran the position. As the British moved into the woods, small parties of British and German infantry stalked each other through trees, small quarries and trenches. The defenders were overrun in about two hours and mopping up began but some German troops were still holding out as dark fell. Most of the remaining defenders retired to Château Maltot on the far side of the road and were cut off and as the 4th Wilts moved forward to the Rau de Maltot stream, they were stopped by fire from the château. Bombardment by the Churchills prompted a German medic to request a truce, which the British were willing to accept, in return for the surrender of all German troops in the château, an offer the Germans declined. At dusk, the British attacked and broke into the ground floor but were held back by showers of hand grenades. Overnight the outbuildings were captured and the château was kept under fire by the tanks.

From 9:30 to 10:00 p.m., both battalions reached the final objectives to the west of Maltot and the woods to the south. The British tanks withdrew, having lost eight vehicles and just after dawn, the remaining Germans in the château gave up. By the end of the operation, the 10th SS-Panzer Division had been reduced from c. 15,000 men to 2,289 and could only counter-attack the most vital positions. At dawn, the British were met by the sight of the dead from Operation Jupiter and by long-range fire from German tanks and guns on the south-east slope of Hill 112. The Wilts had taken more than 400 prisoners in what they called a "text-book" operation. Commanders had studied maps, photographs and sand models, had been given time to establish infantry-tank co-operation with 7th RTR and conduct a reconnaissance of the terrain. The 43rd (Wessex) Division was withdrawn and the ground taken over by the 53rd (Welsh) Division. The Germans withdrew from Hill 112 in August, during Operation Cobra and Operation Bluecoat further west; the 53rd (Welsh) Division occupied the feature with barely a fight on 4 August.
