= Esquay-Notre-Dame =

- Commune
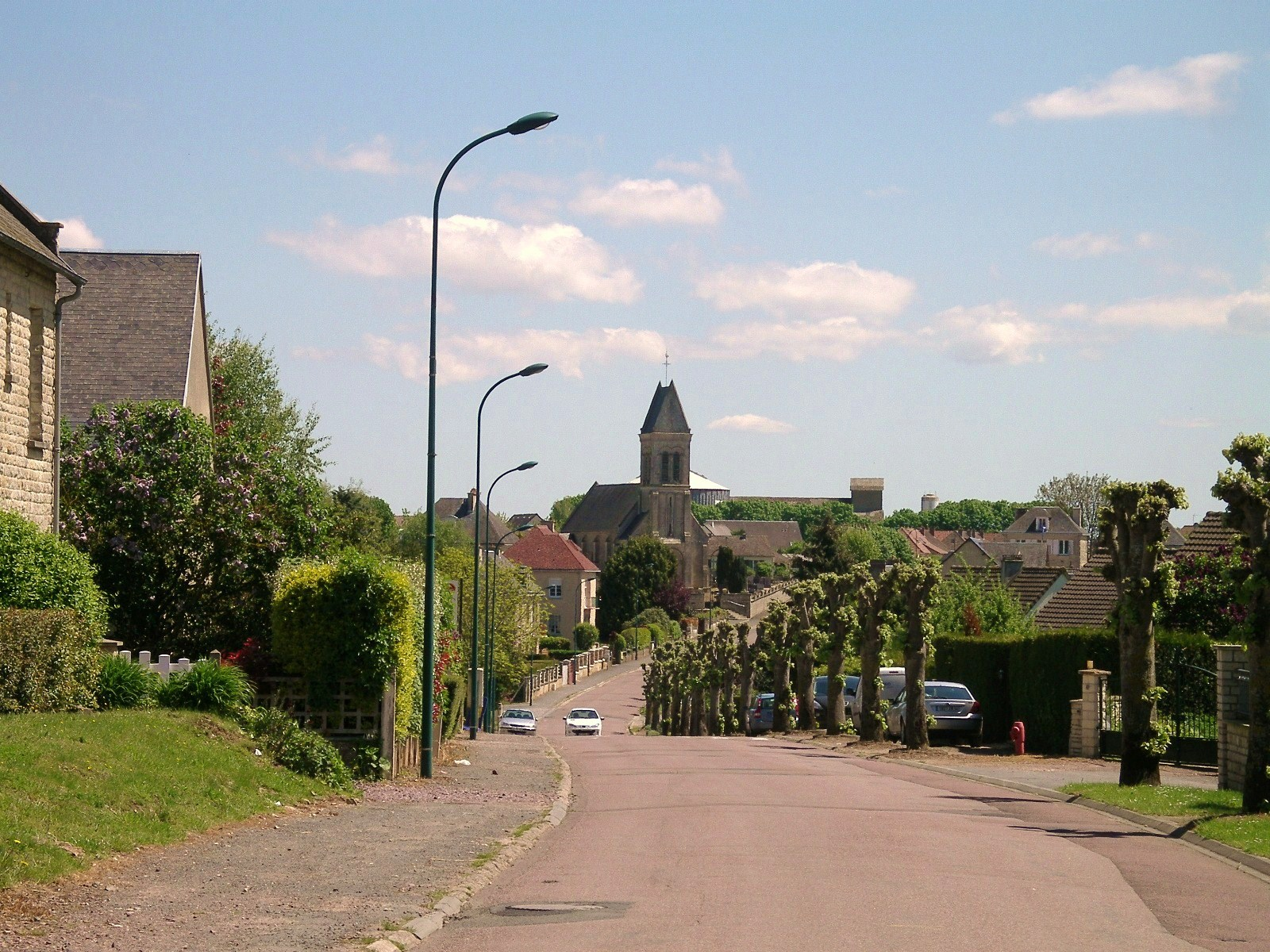
- The church in Esquay-Notre-Dame
- Location of Esquay-Notre-Dame
- Location within France Location within Normandy
- Coordinates: 49°06′48″N 0°28′14″W
- Country: France
- Region: Normandy
- Department: Calvados
- Arrondissement: Caen
- Canton: Évrecy

Government
  - Mayor (2020–2026): Alain Gobé
- Area^{1}: 3.02 km^{2} (1.17 sq mi)
- Elevation: 70 m (230 ft)
- Highest elevation: 112 m (367 ft)
- Lowest elevation: 50 m (160 ft)
- Population (2023): 1,444
  - Density: 478/km^{2} (1,240/sq mi)
- Time zone: UTC+01:00 (CET)
  - Summer (DST): UTC+02:00 (CEST)
- INSEE/Postal code: 14249 /14210
- ^{1} French Land Register data, which excludes lakes, ponds, glaciers > 1 km^{2} (0.386 sq mi or 247 acres) and river estuaries.

Esquay-Notre-Dame (French pronunciation: [ɛkɛ nɔtʁ dam]) is a commune in the Calvados department in the Normandy region in northwestern France.

== Population ==
Historical population
Year	Pop.	±% p.a.
1968	290	—
1975	383	+4.05%
1982	571	+5.87%
1990	728	+3.08%
1999	907	+2.47%
2007	1,244	+4.03%
2012	1,433	+2.87%
2017	1,433	+0.00%
2023	1,444	+0.13%
Source: INSEE

== Points of interest ==
- Hill 112 Memorial site - is built in recognition of the 10,000 men who lost their lives in the 10 week battle for this strategically important hill as part of Operation Epsom and Operation Jupiter (1944). The memorial is shared across 3 communes whose borders all meet near the top of the hill, so in addition to Esquay-Notre-Dame, there is Vieux and Fontaine-Étoupefour. The memorial features a restored A22 Churchill Mk VII tank a 25-pounder Gun and 112 trees planted to form a cross.

== See also ==
- Communes of the Calvados department
- Operation Epsom
