= Vieux, Calvados =

Vieux
- Commune
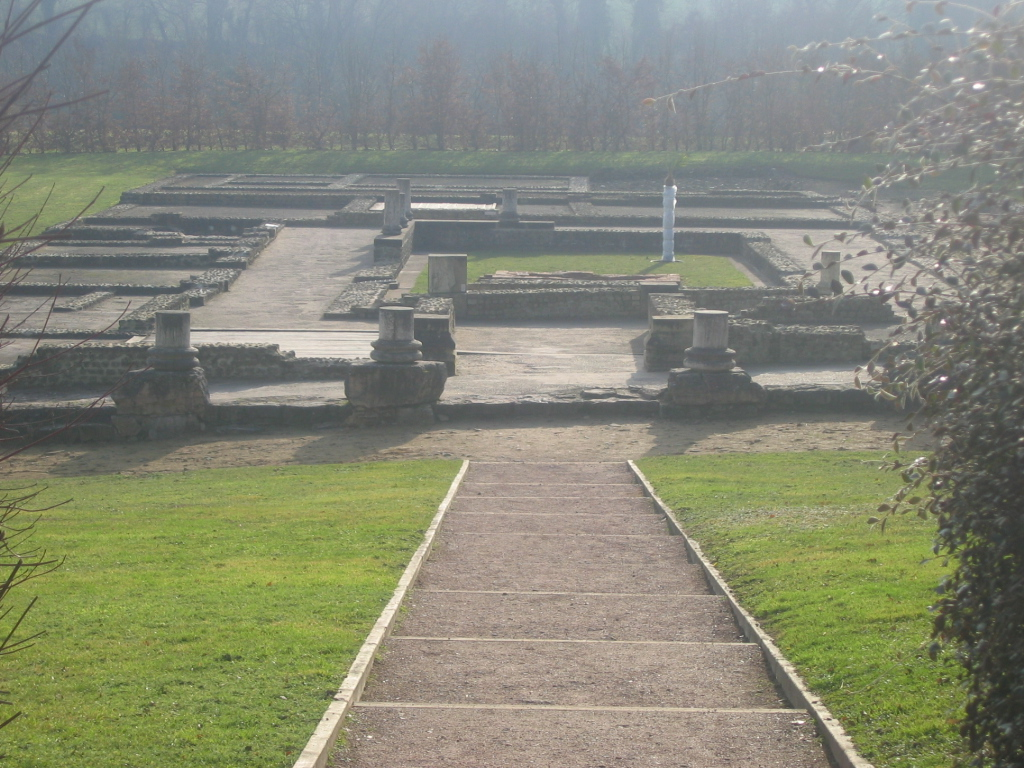
- Roman ruins
- Location of Vieux
- Location within France Location within Normandy
- Coordinates: 49°06′30″N 0°25′57″W
- Country: France
- Region: Normandy
- Department: Calvados
- Arrondissement: Caen
- Canton: Évrecy
- Intercommunality: Vallées de l'Orne et de l'Odon

Government
  - Mayor (2024–2026): Elodie Pasquet
- Area^{1}: 5.50 km^{2} (2.12 sq mi)
- Elevation: 93 m (305 ft)
- Highest elevation: 112 m (367 ft)
- Lowest elevation: 25 m (82 ft)
- Population (2023): 727
  - Density: 132/km^{2} (342/sq mi)
- Time zone: UTC+01:00 (CET)
  - Summer (DST): UTC+02:00 (CEST)
- INSEE/Postal code: 14747 /14930
- ^{1} French Land Register data, which excludes lakes, ponds, glaciers > 1 km^{2} (0.386 sq mi or 247 acres) and river estuaries.

Vieux (French pronunciation: [vjø]) is a commune in the Calvados department in the Normandy region in northwestern France.

== Geography ==
La Guigne river is the only watercourse to flow through the commune.

== History ==
The town contains numerous Roman era ruins, as Vieux was a settlement called Aregenua, and appears on the Roman map, Tabula Peutingeriana. Vieux was the Roman capital of the Viducasses Gallic tribe.

During the Battle of Normandy in 1944, Vieux was designated as Hill 112 position, a strategic point for the Battle of Caen, the area of rue d'Esquay and the Bas de Vieux were badly affected by the allied bombardment of July 6, 1944. The portion of these streets, destroyed at this time are now dated for its name.

== Points of interest ==
- Hill 112 Memorial site - is built in recognition of the 10,000 men who lost their lives in the 10 week battle for this strategically important hill as part of Operation Epsom and Operation Jupiter (1944). The memorial is shared across 3 communes whose borders all meet near the top of the hill, so in addition to Vieux, there is Esquay-Notre-Dame and Fontaine-Étoupefour. The memorial features a restored A22 Churchill Mk VII tank a 25-pounder Gun and 112 trees planted to form a cross.

=== Museums ===
- Vieux-la-Romaine is a Museum of France dedicated to showcasing the life in Aregenua and how it evolved over from a Roman capital to a Medieval village. The Museum contains a Roman Garden, 2 roman houses and a forum.

=== National Heritage Sites ===
The commune has three sites listed as a Monument historique.

- Archaeological remains The houses of the Vieux-la-Romaine museum were listed as monuments in 1988.
- Gallo-Roman theater within the Vieux-la-Romaine museum listed as a monument in 1980.
- Chapelle Saint-Jean-Baptiste-du-Clos thirteenth century chapel that was listed as a monument in 1994.
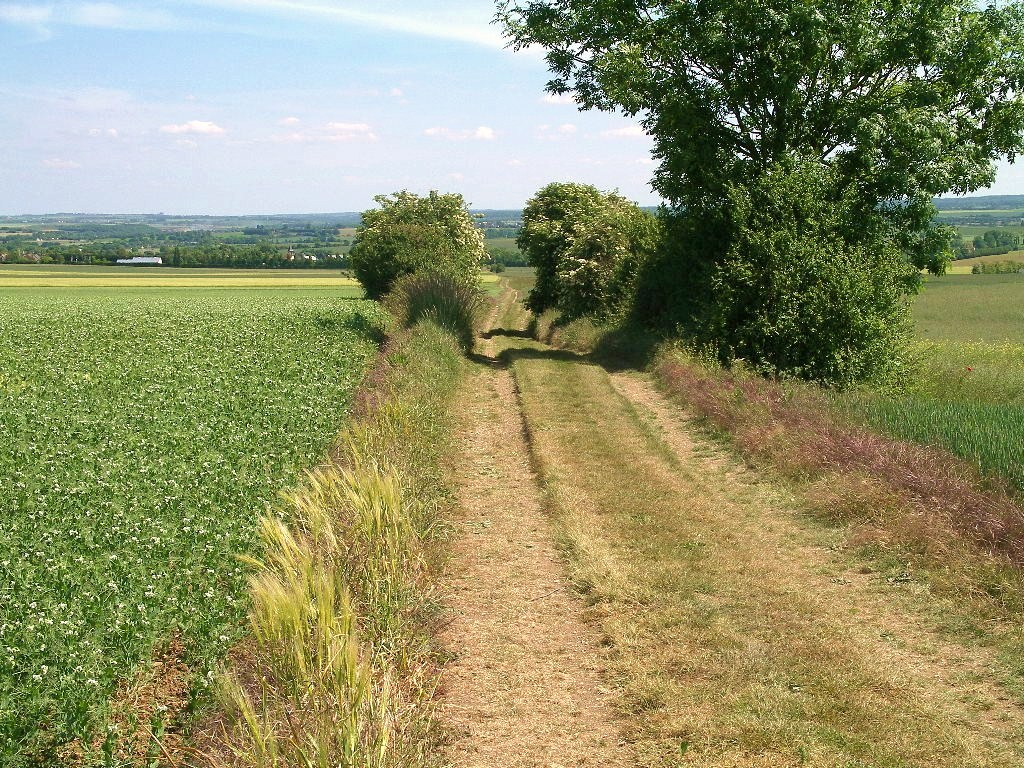
Le chemin Haussé.

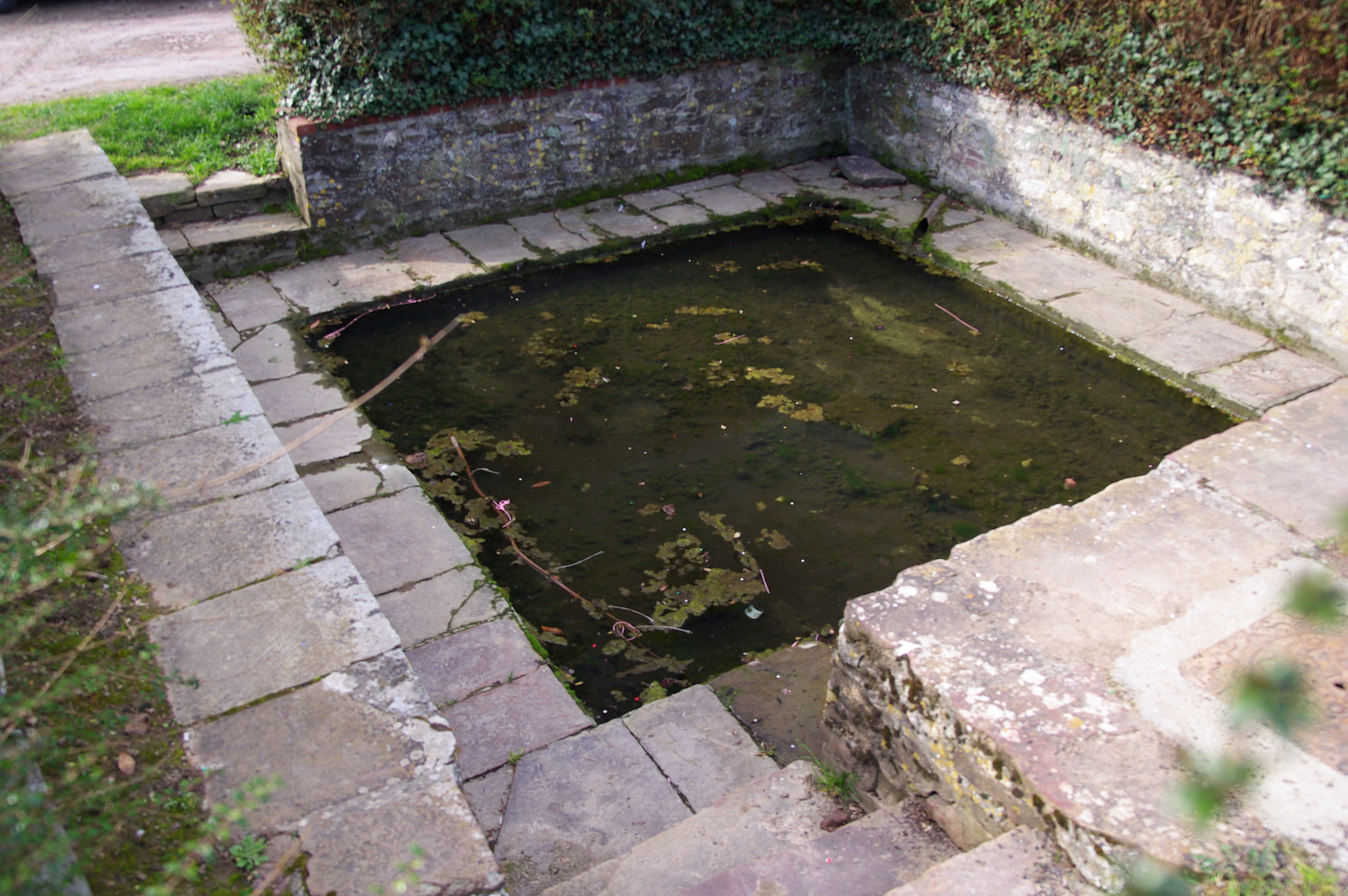
Lavoir de la place Saint-Martin

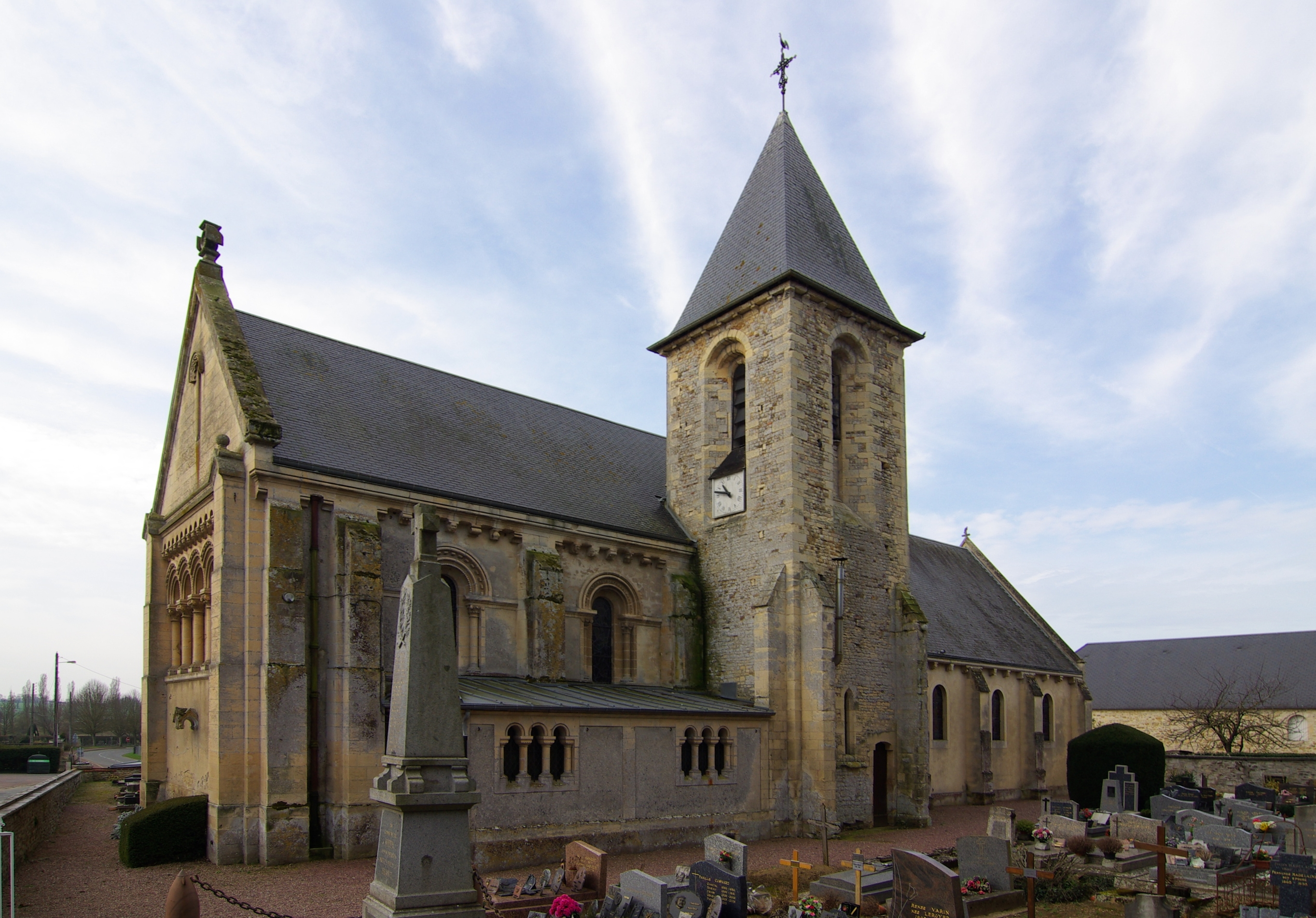
L'église Saint-Laurent.

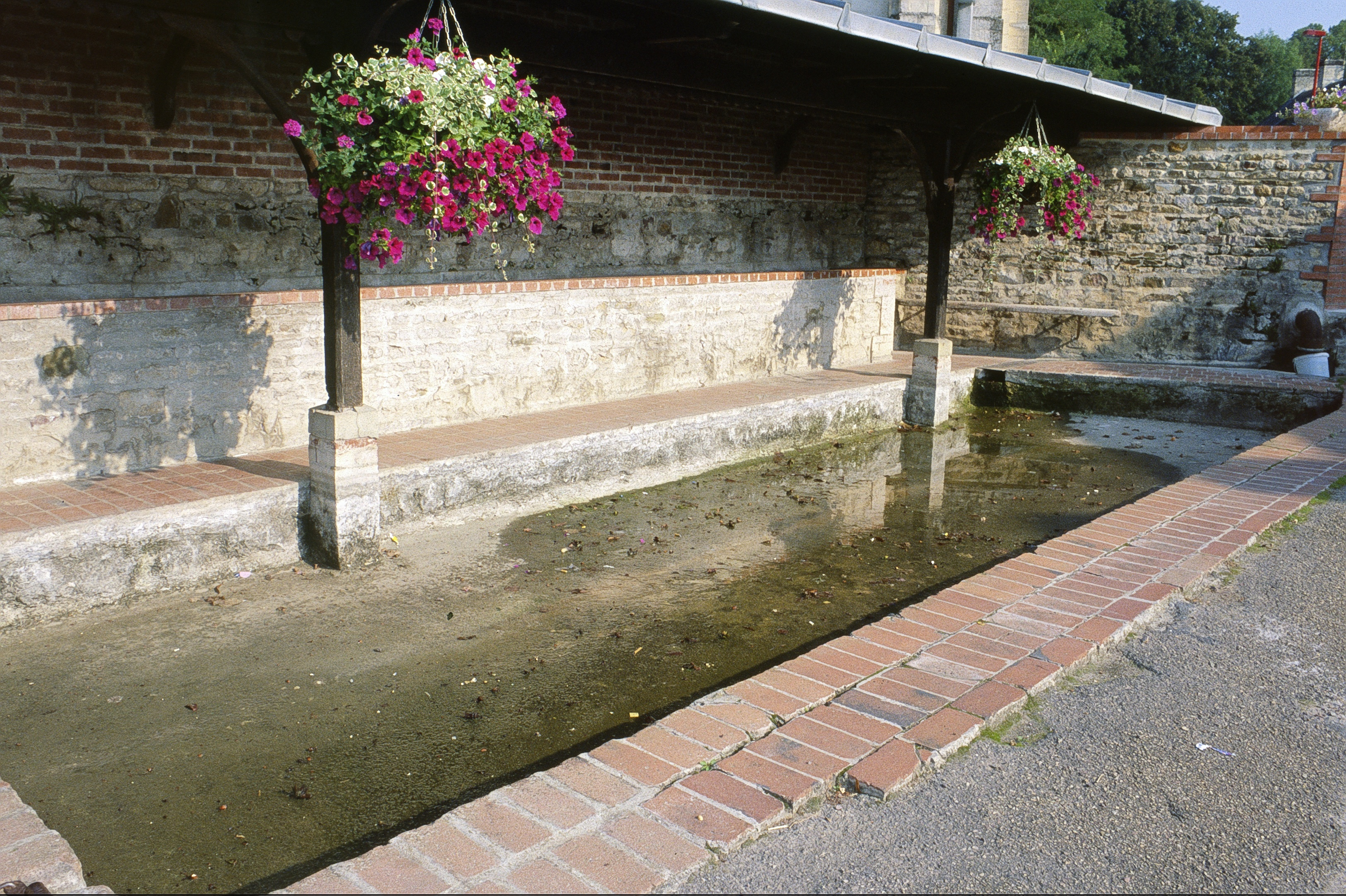
Lavoir prés de church of Saint-Laurent.

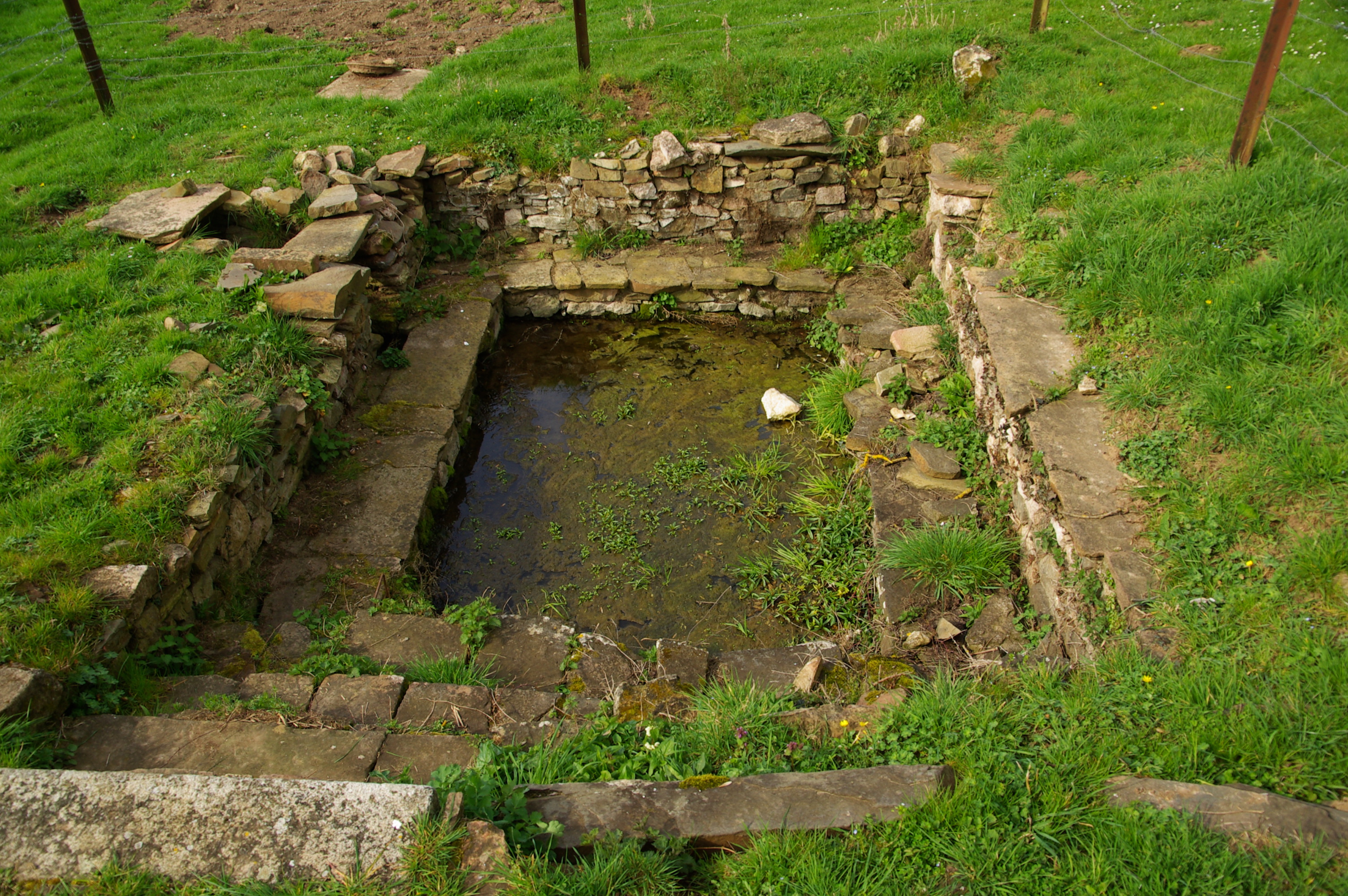
Le lavoir romain des Mareaux.

== Population ==
Historical population

Year	Pop.	±% p.a.
1793	529	—
1821	546	+0.11%
1846	570	+0.17%
1872	477	−0.68%
1901	381	−0.77%
1926	362	−0.20%
1946	283	−1.22%
1962	360	+1.52%
1968	398	+1.69%

Year	Pop.	±% p.a.
1975	411	+0.46%
1982	509	+3.10%
1990	671	+3.51%
1999	585	−1.51%
2007	578	−0.15%
2012	715	+4.35%
2017	686	−0.82%
2023	727	+0.97%

Source: EHESS and INSEE (1968-2023)

== Twin towns – sister cities ==
Vieux is twinned with:

- Otterton, England. Since 1976

== See also ==
- Communes of the Calvados department
