= Ted Nash (entrepreneur) =

British businessman (born 1991)

- Born: 25 March 1991 (age 35); Taunton, Somerset, UK
- Occupation: Businessman
- Years active: 2005–present
- Website: tednash.co.uk

Ted Nash (born 1991) is an English businessman who is best known for launching the site Little Gossip Nash is also known for developing various apps and websites.

== Personal life ==
In 1991, Edward John Nash was born in Taunton, Somerset, United Kingdom to parents Andy and Linda.

== Career ==
In 2009, Nash founded Fit or Fugly, an iPhone application that rated facial attractiveness by measuring the symmetry of an uploaded photograph against anchor points at mouth, nose, ear, chin and eyes.

In 2010, Nash launched Little Gossip, a website that allowed users to anonymously post rumours about their school peers. The site was subject to public criticism from parents, teachers and school administrators. The website also received coverage from BBC Panorama and BBC Radio. It was sold to Platinum Century in 2011.

In 2013, Nash founded Tapdaq, a mobile advertising exchange and served as it's CEO. Tapdaq raised $1.4 million in capital in 2014 to fund commercialisation of its in-app advertising exchange.
