= Pyrland Hall =

Country house in Somerset, England

Coordinates: 51.0428°N 3.1034°W

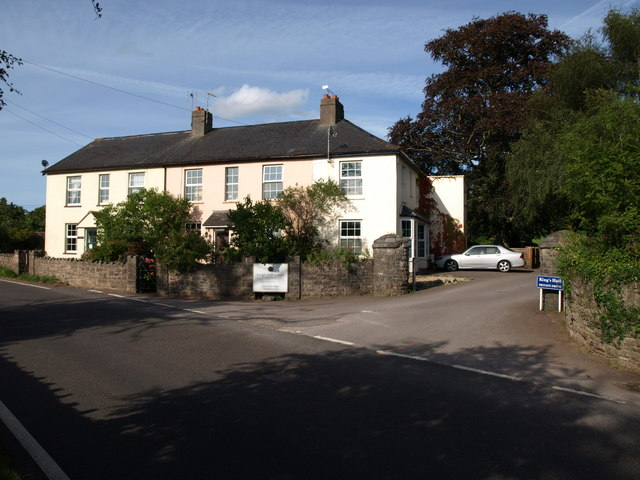
Entrance to Pyrland Hall (on the right)

Pyrland Hall is a country house near Cheddon Fitzpaine in the English county of Somerset. It is a Grade II* listed building.

== History ==
Pyrland Hall was built around 1760 for Sir William Yea of the Yea baronets. It is a brick building with Bath stone dressings under hipped slate roofs. After the death of Sir Henry Lacy Yea, 3rd Baronet in 1864, the house was sold to Arthur Malet. It was then acquired by a Mr G. R. Withington. From 1911 it was the home of Colonel Ernest St. Clair Pemberton who lived at the hall until his death in 1950. James Lees-Milne recorded his unsuccessful attempts to arrange the gifting of the hall to the National Trust, and his impressions of the owner, in his volume Some Country Houses and their Owners; "... a horrible day with Colonel Pemberton. He is a fiendish old imbecile [who] has an inordinate opinion of himself and his own judgement."

During the early years of the Second World War, the house and gardens were used by the British Army as the main headquarters for VIII Corps, which was formed to command the defence of Somerset, Devon, Cornwall and Bristol. The rear headquarters were established at Hestercombe House, with personnel and logistics staff.

Since 1953, the King's Hall School has been housed in the hall. The hall sits within a 32-acre (13 ha) estate, parts of which have been made into playing fields, and is surrounded by National Trust-owned farmland.

== Sources ==
- Newbold, David John. "British planning and preparations to resist invasion on land, September 1939 - September 1940". kclpure.kcl.ac.uk. King's College, University of London.
- Lees-Milne, James (2009) [1975]. Some Country Houses and their Owners. English Journeys. London: Penguin Books. ISBN 978-0-141-19090-7.
