= Alexander Appleford =

Fighter pilot in the RAF (born 1921)

Alexander N Robin L Appleford
- Born: Alexander N Robin L Appleford; September 1921
- Died: 17 April 2012 (aged 90)
- Military career
- Allegiance: United Kingdom
- Branch: Royal Air Force
- Rank: Flight Lieutenant
- Units: No. 66 Squadron RAF; No. 274 Squadron RAF
- Conflicts: World War II: Battle of Britain

Flight Lieutenant Alexander N Robin L Appleford (September 1921 – 17 April 2012) was one of the youngest fighter pilots who flew with the Royal Air Force during the Battle of Britain, and was one of the aircrew called "The Few".

Appleford was born in September 1921. He was educated at King's College, Taunton. After joining the RAF, he was posted on 13 May 1940 to No. 66 Squadron RAF at RAF Duxford, flying Spitfires.

On 4 September 1940 Appleford was shot down over the Thames Estuary during a dogfight with a Bf 109, but baled out slightly wounded.

Following the Battle of Britain, Appleford was a flying instructor. In 1943 he returned to combat duties with No. 274 Squadron RAF flying Hurricanes on coastal defence in North Africa. After a spell with the Aircraft Delivery Unit, he went to South Africa as a flying instructor.

Appleford died on 17 April 2012 in Henley-on-Thames.
