= VIII Corps (United Kingdom) =

World War-era British Army formation

- Formation sign of VIII Corps as a field formation during the Second World War.
- Active: First and Second World Wars
- Country: United Kingdom
- Branch: British Army
- Type: Field corps
- Engagements: First World War: Gallipoli; Battle of the Somme 1916; Second Battle of Arras 1918; Final Advance in Artois; Second World War: Operation Epsom; Operation Jupiter; Operation Goodwood; Operation Bluecoat; Operation Market Garden; Operation Constellation; Operation Plunder

Commanders
- Notable commanders: Lt-Gen Sir Aylmer Hunter-Weston; Lt-Gen Sir Richard O'Connor

Insignia
- Corps formation sign as a Corps District early in the Second World War.

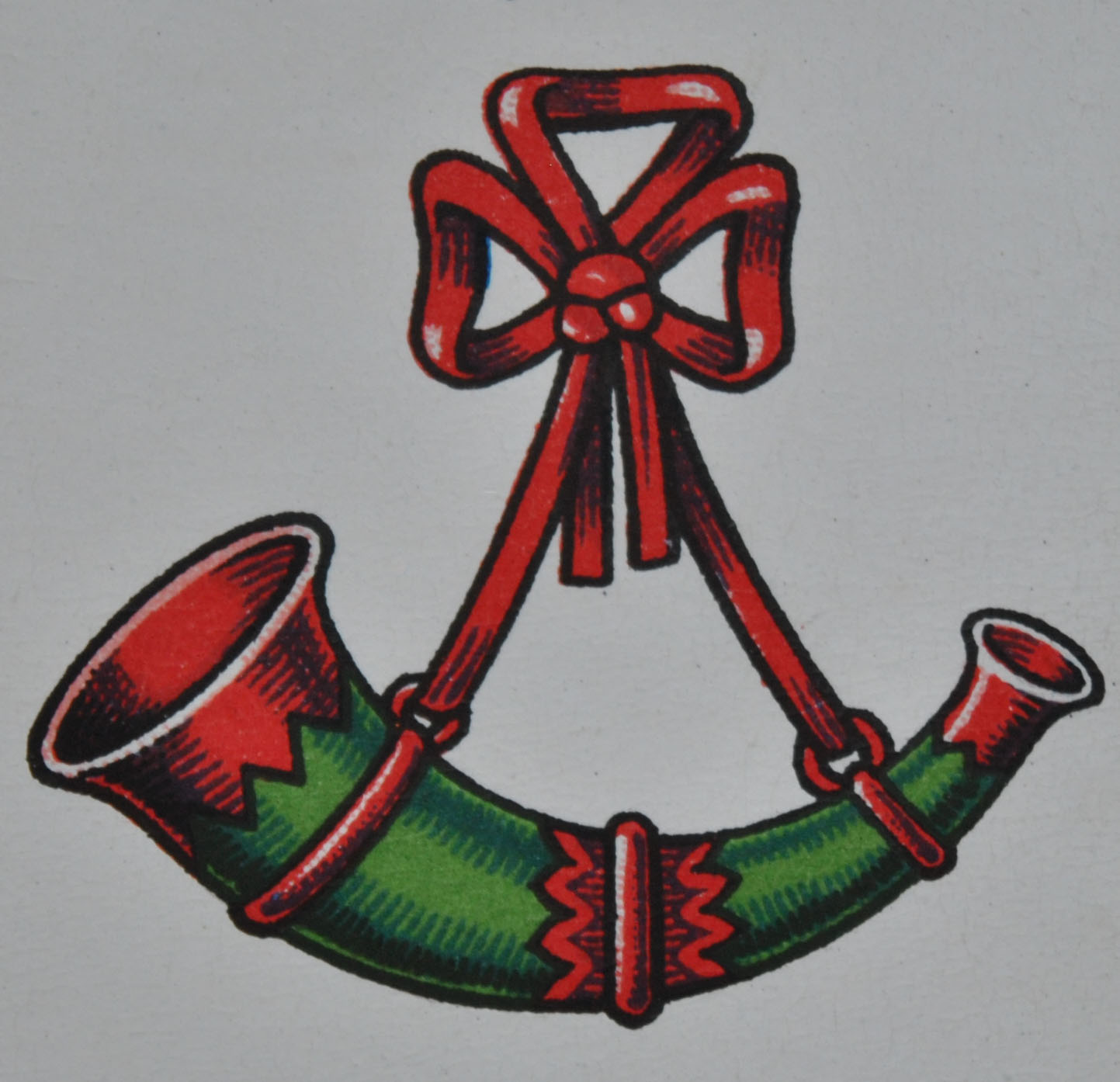
- Corps formation sign during the First World War.

VIII Corps was a British Army corps formation that existed during the First and Second World Wars. In the latter, it took part in the Normandy Campaign in 1944, where it was involved in Operation Epsom and Operation Goodwood. It would later play a supporting role in Operation Market Garden and finish the war by advancing from the Rhine to the Baltic Sea.

== Prior to the First World War ==
In 1876, a Mobilisation Scheme was published for the forces in Great Britain and Ireland, which included eight army corps of the 'Active Army'. The '8th Corps' was to be headquartered at Edinburgh and was primarily militia formation. In 1880, its order of battle was as follows:

- 1st Division (Edinburgh)
  - 1st Brigade (Edinburgh)
    - Kerry Militia (Tralee), Northumberland Militia (Alnwick), Fermanagh Light Infantry Militia (Enniskillen)
  - 2nd Brigade
    - Antrim Militia (Belfast), Cavan Militia (Cavan), Prince of Wales's Own Donegal Militia (Lifford)
  - Divisional Troops
    - 50th Foot (Edinburgh), Ayrshire Yeomanry (Ayr)
  - Artillery
    - O/2nd Brigade RA (Glasgow)
- 2nd Division (Glasgow)
  - 1st Brigade (Glasgow)
    - Highland Borderers Militia (Stirling), Highland Rifle Militia (Dingwall), Scottish Borderers Militia (Dumfries)
  - 2nd Brigade (Hamilton)
    - Cumberland Militia (Carlisle), 1st Durham Militia (Barnard Castle), 2nd Durham Militia (Durham)
  - Divisional Troops
    - Queen's Own Lanarkshire Yeomanry (Glasgow)
- 3rd Division (Melrose)
  - 1st Brigade (Melrose)
    - East York Militia (Beverley), North York Rifle Militia (Richmond), Westmoreland Militia (Carlisle)
  - 2nd Brigade
    - 5th Royal Lancashire Militia (Burnley), 6th Royal Lancashire Militia (Richmond), 7th Royal Lancashire Militia (Bury)
  - Divisional Troops
    - Northumberland and Newcastle Yeomanry (Newcastle)
- Cavalry Brigade
  - Westmorland and Cumberland Yeomanry (Penrith), Lanark Yeomanry (Lanark), East Lothian Yeomanry (Dunbar)

This scheme had been dropped by 1881.

== First World War ==
=== Gallipoli ===
VIII Corps was first formed at Gallipoli during the First World War. The main British battle front was at Cape Helles on the tip of the Gallipoli peninsula. As the battle became protracted, more British divisions arrived as reinforcements. In May 1915, these divisions were arranged as the British Army Corps, which was then redesignated as VIII Corps in June. The corps commander was Lieutenant-General Aylmer Hunter-Weston. When Hunter-Weston relinquished command due to illness, the corps was commanded on a temporary basis by General Francis Davies.

During the Gallipoli campaign, the corps contained the following units:

- 29th Division - (moved to IX Corps at Suvla in August)
- 42nd (East Lancashire) Infantry Division
- 52nd (Lowland) Infantry Division
- Royal Naval Division
- 29th Indian Infantry Brigade - (moved to Australian and New Zealand Army Corps in August)
- Corps of Royal Engineers - 13th Base Park Company, 254th Tunnelling Company and a Postal unit

=== Western Front ===
After the evacuation of Gallipoli, the corps was reformed in France in March 1916, once again under the command of Hunter-Weston, and participated in the Battle of the Somme.

VIII Corps was disbanded in June 1918 when Hunter-Weston moved to the XVIII Corps; however, this corps was then redesignated as VIII Corps in July 1918.

== Second World War ==
=== Home Defence ===
VIII Corps formed part of Home Forces in the UK during the early part of the Second World War. During the Autumn of 1940, it presided over the 3rd and 48th (South Midland) Divisions. Later, it would also command the 77th Infantry Division. It was based at Pyrland Hall near Cheddon Fitzpaine in Somerset and its mission was to command the defence of Somerset, Devon, Cornwall and Bristol.

=== North West Europe ===
VIII Corps fought on the western front in 1944 and 1945 as part of the Second Army. From 21 January to 27 November 1944, it was commanded by Lieutenant-General Richard O'Connor.

At the start of the Normandy Campaign, it comprised:

- Guards Armoured Division (later transferred to XXX Corps)
- 11th Armoured Division (later transferred to XXX Corps)
- 15th (Scottish) Infantry Division (later transferred to XII Corps )
- 6th Guards Tank Brigade
- 8th Army Group Royal Artillery
  - 61st (Caernarvon & Denbigh Yeomanry) Medium Regiment, RA
  - 63rd (Midland) Medium Regiment, RA
  - 77th (Duke of Lancaster's Own Yeomanry) Medium Regiment, RA
  - 146th (Pembroke & Cardiganshire Yeomanry) Medium Regiment, RA
  - 53rd Heavy Regiment, RA
- Corps Troops:
  - 2nd Household Cavalry Regiment
  - 91st (Argyll and Sutherland Highlanders) Anti-Tank Regiment, RA
  - 121st (Leicestershire Regiment) Light Anti-Aircraft Regiment, RA
  - 10th Survey Regiment, RA
  - VIII Corps Troops, Royal Engineers
  - VIII Corps Postal Unit, Royal Engineers
  - VIII Corps Signals

It played a major role in Operations Epsom, Jupiter, Goodwood and Bluecoat, before being reduced in size and moved to the reserve prior to the breakout from Normandy.

The Corps fought in a supporting role during Operation Market Garden on the east flank of XXX Corps with XII Corps to the west of XXX Corps, capturing the Dutch towns of Deurne and Helmond. It took part in the advance on Venray and Venlo. with Operation Constellation beginning on 12 October 1944.

From early December 1944 VIII Corps, was commanded by Lieutenant-General Evelyn Barker, and took part in Operation Plunder, crossing the Rhine 28 March 1945. Following the crossing, the corps was reactivated and allocated the 2nd Army’s right flank for the advance into Germany. By April 1945 the principal formations of the corps were, 11th Armoured Division and 6th Airborne Division reinforced by 6th Guards Armoured Brigade and 1st Commando Brigade. The 15th Scottish Infantry Division joined the Corps on the 4th April. The following weeks were filled with many short but intense battles and fighting across Northern Germany. The Corps crossed the Elbe Operation Enterprise at midnight 30 April advanced north east and occupied Plön in Schleswig-Holstein. The fighting continued until the unconditional surrender by German forces on the 7th May 1945.

== Post-war ==
In the immediate post-war period, the corps formed VIII Corps District in Schleswig-Holstein before being disbanded in 1946. Its final composition was:

- 4th Armoured Brigade
- Jewish Infantry Brigade
- 7th Armoured Division
  - 22nd Armoured Brigade
  - 131st Infantry Brigade (detached to Berlin)
  - 13th Infantry Brigade (attached from 5th Division)
- 15th (Scottish) Infantry Division
  - 46th Infantry Brigade

== General Officers Commanding ==
Commanders included:

- 24 May – 17 Jul 1915 Lieutenant-General Sir Aylmer Hunter-Weston
- 17 Jul – 24 Jul 1915 Lieutenant-General Sir Frederick Stopford (temporary)
- 24 Jul – 8 Aug 1915 Major-General William Douglas (acting)
- 8 Aug 1915 – 27 Jan 1916 Lieutenant-General Sir Francis Davies

–

- 18 Mar 1916 – 22 Jun 1918 Lieutenant-General Sir Aylmer Hunter-Weston

–

- 2 Jul 1918 Lieutenant-General Sir Aylmer Hunter-Weston

–

- Jul 1940 – May 1941 Lieutenant-General Harold Franklyn
- May–Nov 1941 Lieutenant-General Kenneth Anderson
- Nov 1941 – Jan 1943 Lieutenant-General Arthur Edward Grasett
- Jan–Jul 1943 Lieutenant-General Herbert Lumsden
- Jul–Aug 1943 Lieutenant-General Sir Richard McCreery
- Nov 1943 – Jan 1944 Lieutenant-General John Harding
- Jan–Nov 1944 Lieutenant-General Sir Richard O'Connor
- Dec 1944 – Apr 1946 Lieutenant-General Evelyn Barker

== External sources ==
- The Long, Long Trail
- Royal Artillery 1939-45
- Regiments.org
