= Cheddon Fitzpaine =

Village and civil parish in Somerset, England

Coordinates: 51.0431°N 3.0814°W

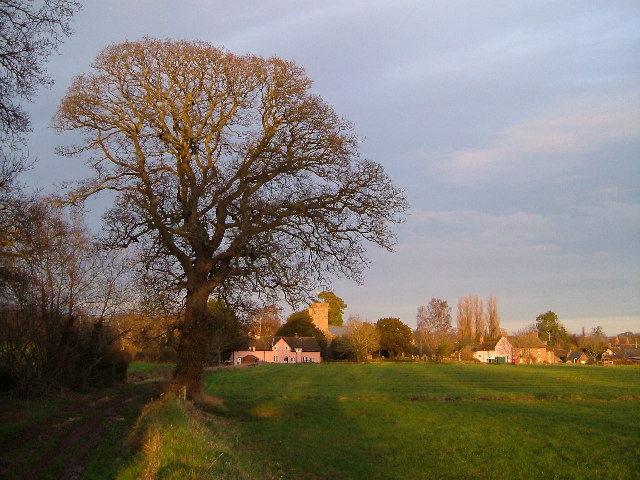
- A view of Cheddon Fitzpaine

- Location within Somerset
- Population: 1,929 (2011)
- OS grid reference: ST242276
- Unitary authority: Somerset Council
- Ceremonial county: Somerset
- Region: South West
- Country: England
- Sovereign state: United Kingdom
- Post town: TAUNTON
- Postcode district: TA2
- Dialling code: 01823
- Police: Avon and Somerset
- Fire: Devon and Somerset
- Ambulance: South Western
- UK Parliament: Taunton and Wellington

Cheddon Fitzpaine is a village and civil parish in Somerset, England, situated on the Quantock Hills, 2 miles (3.2 km) north of Taunton. The village is situated near the Bristol and Exeter Railway, the Bridgwater and Taunton Canal, and the River Tone and has a population of 1,929.

== History ==
Flint and pottery uncovered during archaeological excavations demonstrate late Neolithic to early Bronze-Age and Romano-British settlement sites near Maidenbrook and Nerrols. The name of the village was "Cedenon", probably meaning "wood valley", in 897. After the Norman Conquest it was granted to Roger Arundel and was then passed down through his family. The parish of Cheddon Fitzpaine was part of the Taunton Deane Hundred. In the 16th century the manor was bought by Thomas More of Taunton Priory.

== Governance ==
The parish council has responsibility for local issues, including setting an annual precept (local rate) to cover the council's operating costs and producing annual accounts for public scrutiny. The parish council evaluates local planning applications and works with the local police, district council officers, and neighbourhood watch groups on matters of crime, security, and traffic. The parish council's role also includes initiating projects for the maintenance and repair of parish facilities, as well as consulting with the district council on the maintenance, repair, and improvement of highways, drainage, footpaths, public transport, and street cleaning. Conservation matters (including trees and listed buildings) and environmental issues are also the responsibility of the council.

For local government purposes, since 1 April 2023, the village comes under the unitary authority of Somerset Council. Prior to this, it was part of the non-metropolitan district of Somerset West and Taunton (formed on 1 April 2019) and, before this, the district of Taunton Deane (established under the Local Government Act 1972). From 1894 to 1974, for local government purposes, Cheddon Fitzpaine was part of Taunton Rural District.

It is also part of the Taunton and Wellington county constituency represented in the House of Commons of the Parliament of the United Kingdom. It elects one Member of Parliament (MP) by the first past the post system of election. It was part of the South West England constituency of the European Parliament prior to Britain leaving the European Union in January 2020, which elected seven MEPs using the d'Hondt method of party-list proportional representation.

== Geography ==
Gadds Valley is an area of open grassland and woodland, which has been designated as a local nature reserve.

== Landmarks ==
Pyrland Hall was built as a country house around 1760 for Sir William Yea and later became a boys' preparatory school.

The gardens at nearby Hestercombe House were designed by Sir Edwin Lutyens. The garden's restoration to Gertrude Jekyll's original plans (1904–07) has made it "one of the best Jekyll-Lutyens gardens open to the public on a regular basis", visited by approximately 70,000 people per year. The estate is Grade I listed on the English Heritage Register of Parks and Gardens of Special Historic Interest in England. The site also includes a 0.08 hectare biological Site of Special Scientific Interest as it is used as a roost site by Lesser Horseshoe Bats and has been designated as a Special Area of Conservation (SAC). The site includes a water garden.

The house was used as the headquarters of the British 8th Corps in the Second World War, and has been owned by Somerset County Council since 1951. It is used as an administrative centre and is the current base for the Somerset Fire and Rescue Service control room.

== Religious sites ==
The Anglican parish Church of St Mary has a 13th-century tower and 15th century nave. The Old Rectory near the church was built around 1861, possibly by Edward Jeboult, and later turned into three dwellings.
