= Normandy massacres =

Series of executions of Canadian POWs during World War II

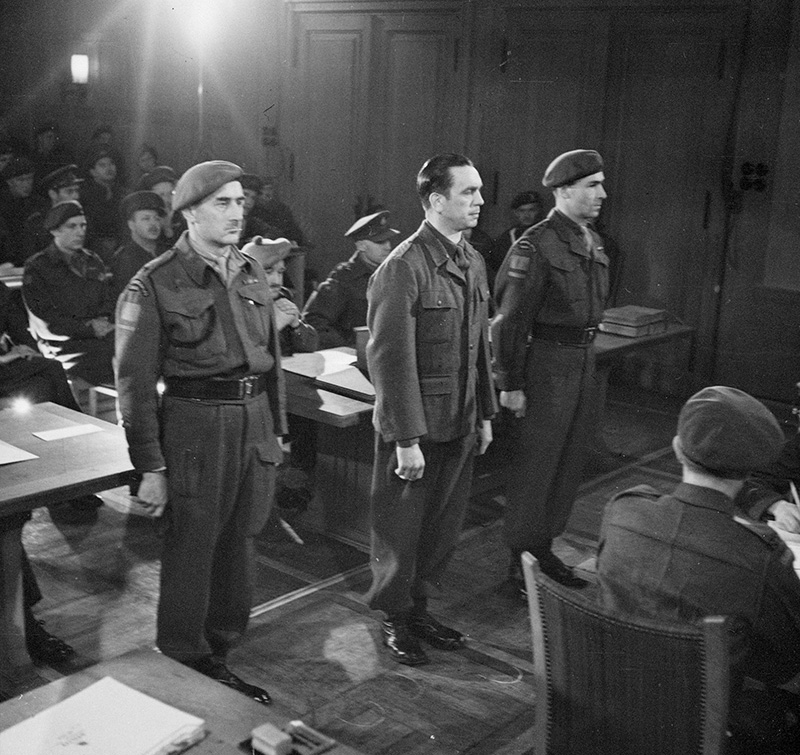
- Kurt Meyer on trial in Aurich, Germany for his involvement in the Normandy Massacres, December 1945
- Location: Normandy, France
- Date: June 7–17, 1944
- Deaths: 158 POWs
- Victims: North Nova Scotia Highlanders, the 27th Armoured Regiment (The Sherbrooke Fusilier Regiment), the Royal Winnipeg Rifles, and other units
- Perpetrator: 12th SS Panzer Division Hitlerjugend
- Convicted: Kurt Meyer

The Normandy massacres were a series of killings in which approximately 156 Canadian and two British prisoners of war (POWs) were murdered by soldiers of the 12th SS Panzer Division (Hitler Youth) during the Battle of Normandy in World War II. The majority of the murders occurred within the first ten days of the Allied invasion of France. The killings ranged in scale from spontaneous murders of individual POWs, to premeditated mass executions involving dozens of victims. The massacres are among the worst war crimes committed against Canadian soldiers in Canada's history.

== Background ==
The 3rd Canadian Division landed at Juno Beach at approximately 07:45, on June 6, 1944. They were opposed by the German 716th Division, which was at two-thirds strength. Juno Beach was secured shortly after 10:00, with Canada incurring hundreds of casualties in the process. Most Canadian units failed to achieve their day-one objectives, but nonetheless advanced inland over 7 miles (11 km). The 12th SS Panzer Division was one of three German armoured divisions that were in reserve relatively close to the Allied beachheads. The division did not deploy to counter the Allied attack until after 15:00 on June 6 when orders were finally issued by German dictator Adolf Hitler.

=== Battle of Authie ===
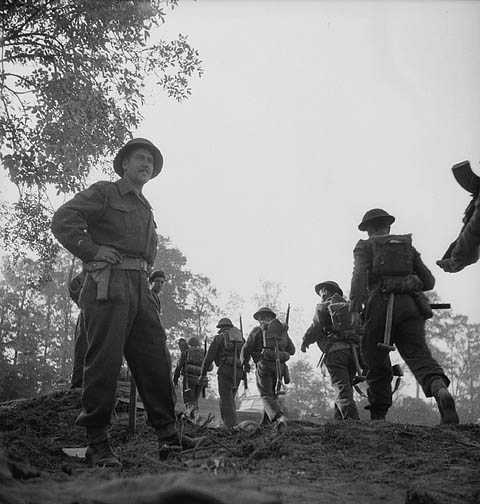
North Nova Scotia Highlanders along the Orne-Vaucelles, July 1944

The 12th SS Panzer Division was ordered to halt the advance near the Orne River, and force the Allies back into the Atlantic Ocean. The 25th Panzer Grenadier Regiment, led by SS-Standartenführer (Colonel) Kurt Meyer, was among the first Hitler Youth units to reach the front. Meyer was a fanatical believer in the Nazi ideology. On the Eastern Front, his regiment had razed multiple villages to the ground — slaughtering their inhabitants in the process. Meyer set up his headquarters in a chateau near Caen on the night of June 6. By this time, the 716th Division had been almost entirely decimated, and could no longer function as a cohesive unit. Meyer received orders to destroy the Juno beachhead at 16:00 on June 7 — giving him less than 15 hours to prepare his forces. Meyer was forced to deploy his forces piecemeal, because many elements had been delayed by strafing from allied fighter-bombers.

As the Germans began their counterattack near the villages of Villons-les-Buissons and Anisy, elements from the North Nova Scotia Highlanders and the Sherbrooke Fusiliers Regiment were advancing southward, and initially did not encounter any resistance. C Company of the North Nova Scotia Highlanders was the first unit to come under fire in this sector, with German artillery and mortar fire killing and wounding a number of Canadians. The Canadian forces were unable to secure any support from artillery or ships offshore, and tanks from the Sherbrooke Fusiliers that were sent to assist had been destroyed soon after arriving. Meyer spotted tanks from the Sherbrooke Fusiliers from his nearby advanced command post at the Abbaye d'Ardenne, and ordered his forces to launch their attack two hours ahead of schedule to exploit the exposed Canadian flank; himself fearing being outflanked.

The Canadians managed to disable or destroy multiple German tanks, but received heavy losses after falling into a German trap at the village of Authie. The Fusiliers' Intelligence Officer was captured by the Germans, who secured his radio codebook. The 12th SS Panzer Division's radio operator was reportedly highly adept at impersonating the commander of the Fusiliers, Lieutenant colonel M. Gordon, making it difficult for Canadian soldiers to distinguish genuine orders from false ones; the German radio operator sent Canadian tanks to pre-plotted fields, where 75mm anti-tank guns picked them off.

Two companies from the North Nova Scotia Highlanders were cut off from the rest of their forces during the German assault; they salvaged three Browning machine guns from their destroyed tanks, and they lost all of their anti-armour support except for one surviving Sherman tank. (Note: Kurt Meyer could see the Canadian defenders dug in an orchard from his vantage point at the Abbey, and he guided an artillery barrage before the main attack, which consisted of tanks with infantry support.) Captain Fraser, who took command of the remaining Canadian forces, managed to reach headquarters and was promised reinforcements if he continued to hold on, but these reinforcements never arrived. Around two dozen Canadians attempted to escape the impending encirclement, while the remaining defenders tried to cover them. The defenders finally surrendered at shortly after 16:00 on June 8; the Canadians suffered 110 men killed, 195 men wounded or captured, and up to 30 tanks disabled or destroyed. The executions commenced before the Canadians had even surrendered.

=== Battle of Putot-en-Bessin ===
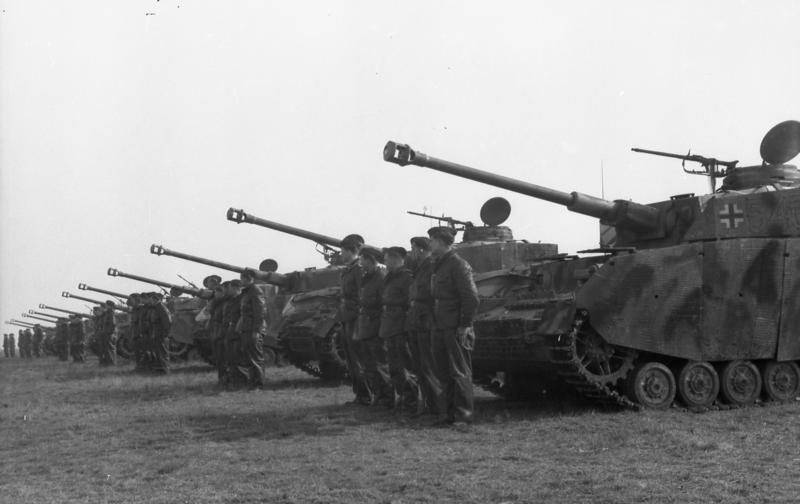
Tanks and personnel from the 12th SS Panzer Division in formation, March 1944

Elements of the 12th SS Panzer Division's 12th Reconnaissance Battalion, which was commanded by SS-Sturmbannführer Gerhard Bremer, set up fortifications at the front on the night of June 7. The 26th Panzer Grenadier Regiment arrived on the line at around the same time. One of its officers was SS-Obersturmbannführer (Lieutenant Colonel) Wilhelm Mohnke, who had a highly volatile temper and previously ordered the execution of over 100 POWs during the Battle of France in 1940. The Germans were facing forces from the Royal Winnipeg Rifles, the Regina Rifles, the Queen's Own Rifles, the 3rd Canadian Anti-Tank Regiment, and the Cameron Highlanders.

Mohnke ordered his battalions to conduct patrols on the night of June 7, to prepare for attacks against Brouay, Putot, and Norrey. One of the patrols came across a Canadian mine-laying party, and in the ensuing engagement three Canadians became separated from their units and were captured by the Germans three days later. Mohnke's forces attacked shortly after 02:00 on June 8, achieving mixed outcomes in the initial phases of the battle. The 1st Battalion of the 26th Panzer Grenadier Regiment pushed deep into Canadian lines, but failed to flank Norrey, which remained in Canadian control.

Part of the 2nd Battalion first attacked a railway bridge near Putot, but the Canadian defenders repulsed this attack. Other elements from the 2nd Battalion attacked positions in other parts of the village, and the two sides engaged in a ferocious battle which involved some house-by-house fighting. The 3rd Battalion attacked a railway line between Putot and Brouay. The Canadian defenders tried to buy time for reinforcements to arrive, but by 13:30 they were completely surrounded and unable to communicate with the outside world; only a few men managed to escape the trap and reach friendly lines. The Royal Winnipeg Rifles suffered around 256 men killed, wounded, or captured. More than 100 prisoners were immediately sent to Mohnke's regimental command under military police escort, while 40 other POWs were kept in a stable at the Moulin farm while awaiting a military police escort; they were held in cramped conditions but their captors initially treated them according to the standards mandated by the Geneva Conventions.

== Massacres ==
=== Authie murders ===
==== Initial killings ====
The 3rd Battalion of the 12th SS Panzer Division, commanded by SS-Obersturmbannführer Karl Heinz Milius, committed some of the first atrocities against the Canadian prisoners of war. The SS troopers were infuriated by the number of casualties they incurred when taking the village, and that these losses were inflicted by soldiers they viewed as inferior. The first victim was Private Lorne Brown, who refused to retreat and leave a severely wounded comrade behind. The wounded man reported seeing Brown stand up in response to an order from a German soldier, only to be forced to the ground right after. The German pinned Brown with his heel, and repeatedly bayoneted him while shouting curses. The other wounded Canadian pretended to be dead, and was later captured by another SS soldier.

A villager stated that Canadian soldiers had cleared the main street of civilians before digging in to fight the German attackers. This resident witnessed one Canadian walking towards German troops with his hands raised, only to be shot when he was just a few meters away. Soon after, they witnessed Private William Nichol attempt to move out of the line of fire after being shot in his right leg. A German officer ran up to Nichol, picked up his rifle, and bashed his skull in with the rifle butt, before shooting one bullet into his corpse. Lance Corporal Mackay was being escorted toward a group of his fellow POWs, but suddenly got pushed into a nearby doorway by his escort. The guard briefly spoke with two other German soldiers, before heading back in the street with Mackay; the latter then witnessed the Germans order eight POWs to go to the middle of the road and take their helmets off, then proceeding to fatally shoot them. One of the Germans pulled two bodies — including that of Corporal Thomas Davidson — into the road for traffic to run over, while his comrades stopped villagers from moving the bodies out of the way. By the time a villager received permission to bury the two bodies, they were in such bad condition that he had to use a shovel to collect their remains. The corpse of another murdered Canadian was sat up, and given a hat and cigarette as props. The mass executions and bodily mutilations were witnessed by other Canadian POWs as well.

To the left of Authie, another company of the 3rd Battalion committed additional murders. The first victim, Private John Metcalfe, was being searched along with 15–20 other POWs, when he fell because of rough handling from a German captor. The guard then fired four shots into Metcalfe's abdomen, and smiled while letting him lie in pain for a few minutes. The German ultimately shot Metcalfe three times in the head, and emptied the rest of his magazine into the body. Lance Corporal Joseph R. Arsenault was undergoing a similar search, and held two grenades in his hands to clearly show the German soldiers what he had. An SS officer took the grenades and spoke to Arsenault in French; after Arsenault responded in French, the officer fatally shot him in his neck. The Germans were soon forced to evacuate Authie due to British naval shelling, and murdered at least 12 Canadian POWs during the subsequent evacuation. Six of them were killed together in the kitchen of a French home, while another two were a Canadian medic wearing a red cross armband (signifying his status as a noncombatant), and his patient.

The executions were temporarily halted after Major Leon M. Rhodenizer, who commanded A Company of the North Nova Scotia Highlanders, appealed to the SS soldiers in German. However, the column of POWs passed SS soldiers going the opposite direction, toward the front. The officer leading the oncoming SS column began to shoot into the line of POWs, and his men followed suit; nine POWs were killed in this massacre. Later, a German truck with Red Cross markings deliberately drove into the procession of POWs and ran over three men — two of whom died from their injuries. Some Canadian officers in captivity were later forced to sign papers falsely claiming that those two victims died from combat injuries. To reinforce this lie, the Germans held a military funeral for these two victims, which was recorded by a German cameraman.

The last man known to be murdered by members of the 3rd Battalion on June 7 was army chaplain Captain Walter Brown, of the Sherbrooke Fusiliers. He set out in a jeep to visit an officer who was recovering at a field hospital in Les Buissons. He was accompanied by Lieutenant W.F. Grainger, and Lance Corporal J.H. Greenwood (who was driving). They left for the hospital at 11:30 on June 7, and soon became lost. They stopped near the village of Galmanche to try and get their bearings, and were shot at by an SS patrol while disembarking from their jeep to surrender. Greenwood was killed by the initial volley, while Grainger was wounded. Grainger saw Brown walk toward the SS patrol with his hands raised, but passed out before seeing what became of him. Grainger came to some time later, and managed to drive himself back to friendly lines. Brown's body was found several weeks later, close to where the trio had initially stopped; a single stab wound from a bayonet pierced his heart.

==== Ardenne Abbey massacre ====
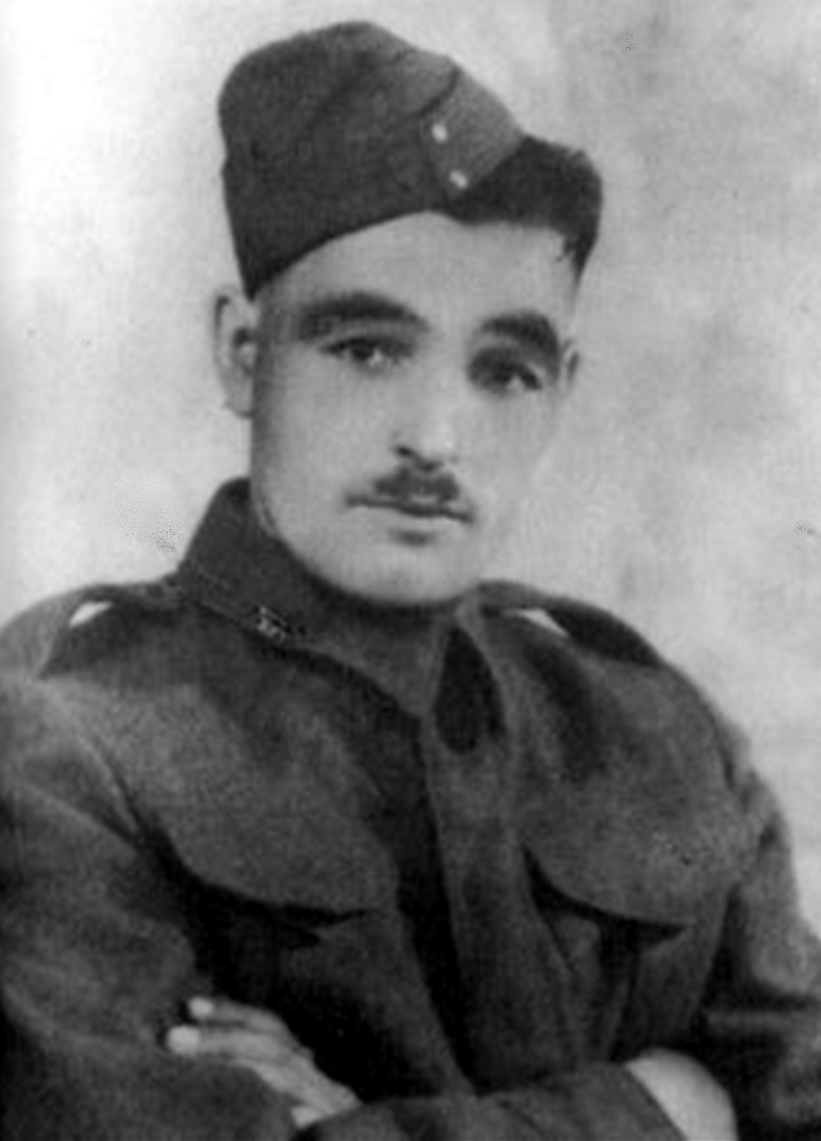
Private Charles Doucette, who was among the first ten men to be murdered at the Abbey d'Ardenne

The column of Canadian POWs continued their journey into captivity, eventually being herded into the courtyard of the Ardenne Abbey, where Meyer had an advanced command post. After being searched, they were allowed to put their hands down, smoke, and walk around the courtyard. After around 30 minutes, some military police officers approached the Canadians and asked for volunteers. They refused to say what they wanted volunteers for, so nobody stepped forward. The Germans responded by choosing ten POWs at random, who were from the North Nova Scotia Highlanders and the Sherbrooke Highlanders, and took them away from the main group of POWs. The Germans proceeded to interrogate one POW at a time, then execute them. The first six were bludgeoned to death, and the last four were shot in their heads; the Germans then executed an eleventh POW who had stayed behind because he was seriously wounded.

The next day, on June 8, another group of seven POWs were executed. SS Private Jan Jesionek saw two comrades escort the prisoners into a stall adjoining the abbey. One of the troopers reported to Meyer, who angrily remarked "What do we do with these prisoners; they only eat up our rations?" He had a whispered conversation with one of his officers, then loudly declared "In the future, no prisoners are to be taken!"

The officer who spoke with Meyer proceeded to interrogate the seven prisoners, but was unsatisfied with their responses. A few minutes later, the officer called out a name. The prisoner walked into the nearby garden, and when he turned the corner he was shot in the back of his head by a machine pistol. This tipped the prisoners off to their fate, and as each name was called, the man in question went down the line of his comrades and firmly shook each of their hands. According to Jesionek, none of the men begged for their lives or tried to escape.

=== Putot-en-Bessin murders ===
==== Chateau d'Audrieu ====
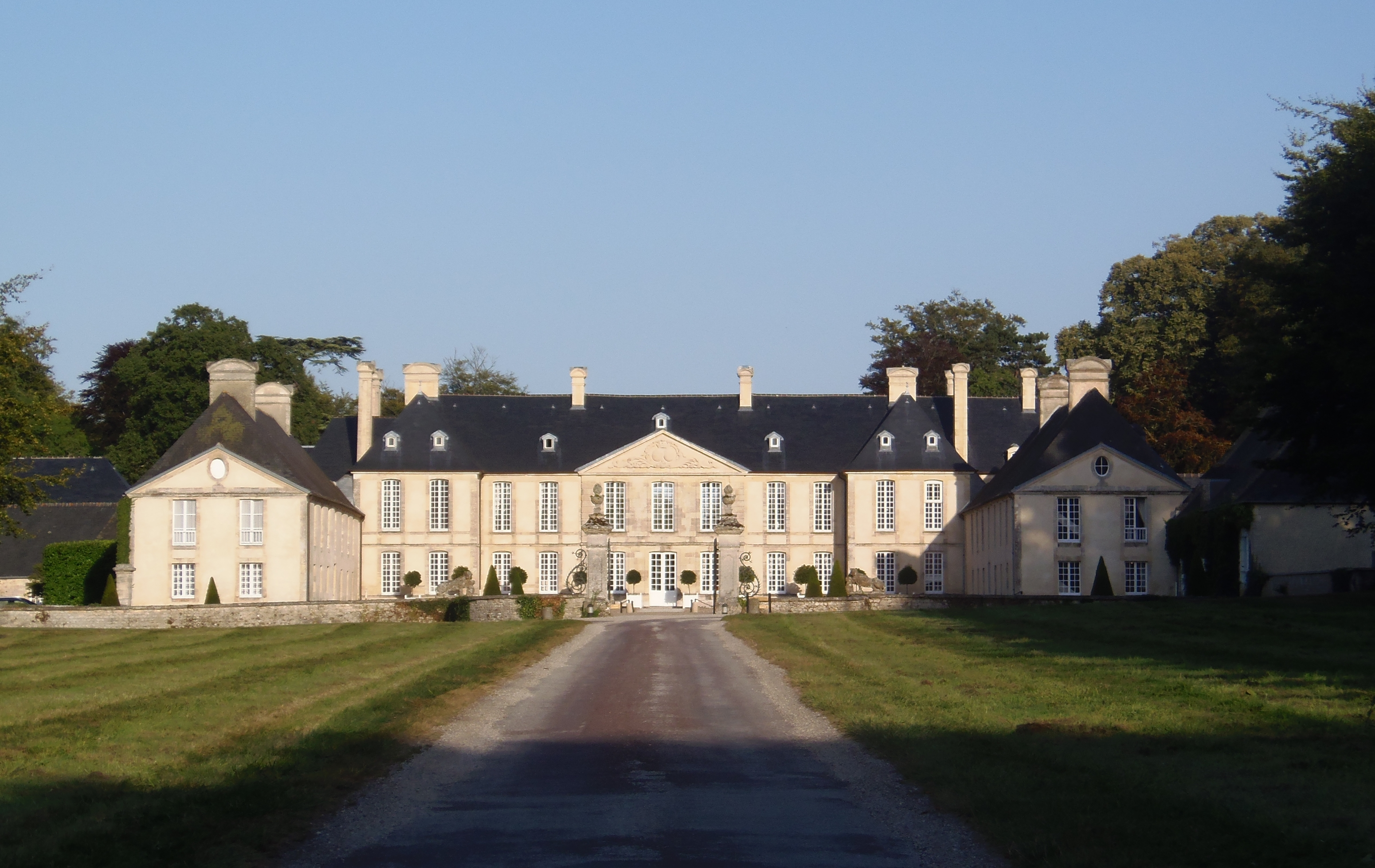
The Chateau d'Audrieu

The first executions after the Battle of Putot-en-Bessin occurred in the afternoon of June 8. A group of 24 Canadian and two British prisoners were brought to the Chateau d'Audrieu, where the Germans set up their battalion headquarters. Bremer spoke English and conducted the interrogations with the prisoners. The first group of three POWs to be questioned included Major Frederick Hodge, who commanded the Royal Winnipeg Rifles' A Company. Shortly after 14:00, the three prisoners were marched single file, with their hands raised, to a cluster of trees and shrubs on the grounds of the chateau. They were then executed by a makeshift firing squad composed of their guards. Two of the victims turned around at the last moment to face their killers.

Bremer interrogated the next group of three POWs until the execution party returned, then sent the party away with this next group at around 14:30. One of the prisoners was a medic wearing a Red Cross armband. The group was taken to a clearing close to the site of the first murders, but ordered to lie on their stomachs in order to avoid another show of defiance. The men were then ordered to prop their heads in their hands while resting their arms on their elbows, then each man was shot in the head at point-blank range by a German standing above them.

The remaining 18 Canadian and two British POWs were left alone while Bremer led the defence against a British attack; the killings resumed once Bremer returned. At around 17:00, 13 Canadians were ordered to stand in a row in an orchard, then they were killed by a volley of rifles, machine pistols, and side arms. Privates Emmanuel Bishoff, Herve Labrecqué, and Robert Mutch were not fatally wounded, and were finished off by an officer. The officer then discovered that two men had not been hit at all. Private Steve Slywchuck made a well-timed dive to feign being hit, while Lance Corporal Frank Meakin was saved by his older brother George, who stepped in front of Frank and was hit in the chest by multiple machine pistol bullets as a result. The officer killed Frank, then proceeded to empty the remainder of his magazine into Slywchuck's head. The remaining five Canadian and two British POWs were executed last, not far from where the first two groups were killed.

==== Caen−Fontenay crossroads ====
The prisoners kept in the stable at the Moulin farm initially received good treatment from the 2nd Battalion of the 12th SS Panzer Division, which was commanded by SS-Sturmbannführer Bernhard Siebken. These 40 men were kept behind while military police escorted a group of over 100 POWs toward Mohnke's headquarters. In the late afternoon, a few hours after the Canadians were captured, Siebken received a phone call from Mohnke, who ordered him "not to send back so many prisoners." Siebken understood this as an order to kill surrendering soldiers instead of capturing them, and he informed Mohnke that he would continue to send POWs to the rear. A military police escort arrived shortly thereafter, and the 40 POWs (including two stretcher cases) set out under a mixed guard of military police and SS soldiers at around 20:00 on June 8.

Roughly an hour later, the column was intercepted by an SS staff car, and an officer angrily shouted at the man in charge of the escort, before barking a series of orders. One prisoner, Lieutenant Reg Barker, told those around him that he spoke German and the escorts had been ordered to kill all of the prisoners, but he would try to talk them out of it. The prisoners were made to walk close to the Caen-Fontenay road, where a convoy of German tanks and half-tracks was observed heading toward them. They were sent into a grassy area around 50 yards (46 m) from an intersection near the village of Fontenay-le-Pesnel, and made to sit in rows; stretcher cases were put in the middle. A few minutes passed while one of the half-tracks left the convoy and drove to the prisoners in the field. The men who exited the half-track exchanged weapons and ammunition with the escort, then 11 SS soldiers armed with automatic weapons closed in on the prisoners. All remaining hopes of mercy evaporated when Barker, who was sitting in the front row, instructed the other POWs: "Whoever is left after they fire the first round, go to the left [north]." The Germans stopped 30 yards (27 m) from the prisoners, one of them proclaimed "Now you die", then the soldiers opened fire into the rows.

Many of the men in the first row were killed instantly, while others were severely wounded and lay in agony. The men in the inner rows tried desperately to avoid being hit by the bullets flying around them, but none were able to escape. The men in the rear-most row had had a slightly better chance of surviving than the other prisoners. The Germans only positioned themselves at the front of the group, meaning that escape in other directions was possible. Of the 40 Canadians targeted in the field that night, only five managed to escape; two of whom were shot during their attempts. At least four additional men were killed while trying to flee. This was the single worst war crime committed against Canadians in Canada's military history, and has drawn comparisons to the December 1944 Malmedy Massacre.

==== Other murders ====
Three soldiers who were cut off behind German lines during the battle at Putot-en-Bessin were captured at around midnight on June 9; all three were wounded and found lying in a field near the 2nd Battalion's headquarters. They were fed, received medical aid, and slept on straw beds. Mohnke caught word about the prisoners, and repeatedly ordered Seibken and his immediate subordinate, Schnabel, to execute the three men; both refused each time. Seibken called 12th SS Headquarters to confirm their attitude toward taking prisoners, and he was instructed by Chief of Staff Hubert Meyer to take as many POWs as possible because of their intelligence value. Despite this directive, Mohnke continued to harass 2nd Battalion headquarters staff about the prisoners. Finally, Mohnke found Schnabel and ordered him at gunpoint to kill the prisoners. One man was able to make his way outside on his own, while another had to be supported by the third prisoner. Three SS men lined up across from the prisoners, and killed them with a short burst of gunfire.

The three Canadians who were separated from their mine-laying party were captured after approximately 72 hours of trying to reach Canadian lines. They were brought to an orchard where the 26th Panzer Grenadier Regiment had its headquarters. Military policemen brought them to Mohnke's headquarters, where they were inspected by Mohnke, his Adjutant, and a third soldier. They were interrogated by Mohnke and the others for approximately 15 minutes, during much of-which Mohnke was observed shouting at the three prisoners and dramatically gesturing. After the interrogation was finished, the prisoners were stripped of their identification tags, brought to a bomb crater 300 yards (270 m) away from the headquarters, and executed within full view of Mohnke and his Adjutant. In total, Mohnke was involved with the murders of at least 41 Canadian POWs — more than any other senior officer in the 12th SS Panzer Division.

=== Final killings ===
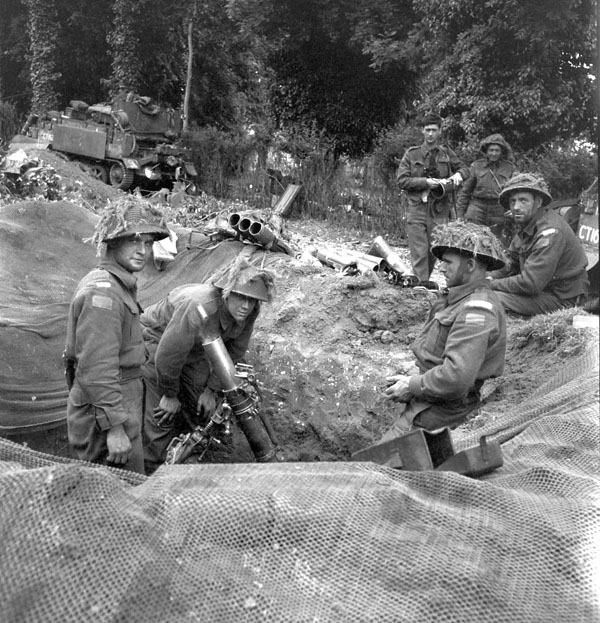
The 3-inch (7.62 cm) mortar firing personnel of Support Company, the Regina Rifle Regiment, near Bretteville-l'Orgueilleuse

The murders of the 36 other Canadian prisoners occurred in smaller incidents than some of the preceding atrocities. During a battle in Bretteville-sur-Odon, on June 8, elements of the Regina Rifles and Cameron Highlanders were overrun after defending their outpost for half an hour. When soldiers from their units reached that outpost on June 10, Canadian soldiers found the corpses of 13 Canadians who had been executed. Some were shot in the backs of their head with a pistol, while others were shot point-blank by a machine gun. The bodies were scattered around the area of the outpost; three bodies were alone, two were beside each other, and there were also two groups of four bodies.

In the nearby village of Norrey, soldiers of the Regina Rifles managed to repel the German tanks, preventing Meyer's and Mohnke's regiments from linking up. Two Canadians in an advanced outpost became cut off from their unit by the German thrust. The two men were discovered by German soldiers and their comrades reported seeing them being led away with their hands raised. They were questioned by an officer, who suddenly became visibly angry and fatally shot Private Ernest Gilbank three times in the stomach. The officer then shot Private L. W. Lee once in the groin, but an artillery barrage struck right when the officer fired again and his shots all missed. Lee made it back safely to Canadian lines after 36 hours, after evading a German patrol and reported the war crime to his superiors.

The next murders occurred in six incidents on June 11, when the Canadian Army launched a large tank attack close to the village of Le Mesnil-Patry. This was part of a larger British operation to encircle Caen. The Canadian segment of the attack composed of elements from the 2nd Canadian Armoured Brigade, who were supported by men of the Queen's Own Rifles of Canada. The attack failed and cost the Canadians dozens of tanks and almost 200 men killed, wounded or captured. During the battle and after it ended, German forces executed numerous Canadians. Sergeant William Simmons' Sherman tank was disabled during the battle and he led his surviving crew toward Canadian lines. Seeing a German tank approaching them, Simmons ordered his men to scatter then ran toward the tank to distract it. His body was later found in a ditch at the 2nd Battalion headquarters, showing signs of an execution. The remainder of his surviving crew members were captured by German soldiers, but as they were being led back to the German rear, their captors shot at them. One of the men was killed but the other two were not hit and the Germans did not check to see if all three men were dead before leaving without them. The two survivors reached safety a few days later.

Many Canadian tank crews who surrendered to soldiers of the 12th SS Panzer Division suffered a similar fate, with some being executed soon after being captured, while others were beaten severely first. A German soldier was ordered to kill a group of four POWs after guiding them a short distance down a road. The German shouted in English "Run, run!" to the four men, and opened fire at the same time; one man was shot in the head and died instantly, another lay in agony on the road for five hours before he died and the other two escaped without being injured. During the tank battle, four other Canadian prisoners, two wounded, arrived at the 2nd Battalion's first-aid post. One soon died of his injuries, but the other lived on. On the night of June 11 all three were executed and buried near three victims of a previous killing. Nine Canadians were executed between June 12 and 17, when the Normandy massacres were considered by officials to end.

=== Other massacres ===
The historian, Howard Margolian, wrote in Conduct Unbecoming that two more massacres might be attributed to the 12th SS Panzer Division, despite no bodies being located. The first allegedly took place during an Allied attack against Caen on June 26. Canadian forces were being held in reserve, but a Polish conscript serving with the Wehrmacht, says he saw up to 15 SS soldiers guarding seven Canadian POWs. Some of the SS men lifted their machine pistols and killed the Canadians.

The second incident is alleged to have occurred on the morning of July 8, during another Allied attempt to take Caen. According to a German soldier who provided the details during an interrogation, his company killed 15–20 Canadian POWs near Cambes-Anisy. In each case, no bodies were found, nor did any witnesses corroborate their claims. Canadian forces were not on the front line of either sector that the atrocities are alleged to have occurred. Each man was adamant that they had seen Canadian soldiers executed in these instances.

== Investigation ==
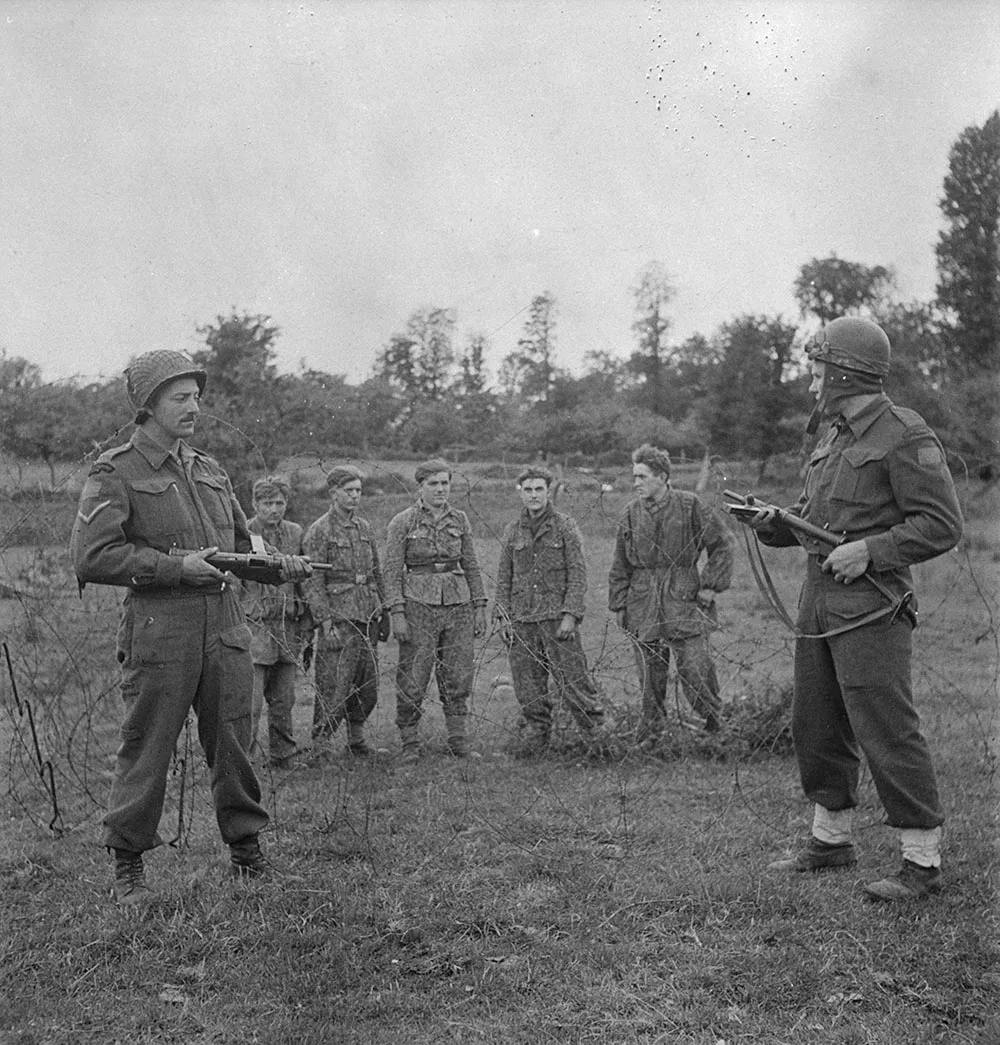
Soldiers of the German 12th SS Panzer Division guarded by two Canadian Provost Corps soldiers, July 7–8, 1944

Allied High Command received word about the atrocities on June 8, 1944, when soldiers from the British Dorset Regiment set up their headquarters at the Chateau d'Audrieu. They met Monique Level, the daughter of the chateau's proprietor, who informed them about the massacre that occurred there. Major Lloyd Sneath, the Dorset's second-in-command, had served with the Royal Winnipeg Rifles before the war as part of a British-Canadian military exchange program. Upon seeing the bodies, he realized that he recognized many of the victims. Horrified, he ordered some of his men to preserve the crime scene and identify the 13 victims. The report he subsequently wrote, which confirmed what Level had told him, was read by General Bernard Montgomery, commander of land forces in Normandy. Two weeks later, British forces searched the area more thoroughly and uncovered 13 more bodies: 11 Canadian, and two British. Throughout the coming weeks, additional graves of victims were uncovered; including a mass grave that contained almost three dozen bodies. As late as December 1945, the Canadian Government was still informing next-of-kin that their relatives had been murdered, and were not killed in action as they had been told.

The Allies decided to convene special courts martial to address the atrocities at the chateau, and the British 21st Army Group was put in charge of the investigation. Despite Montgomery reportedly being disgusted by the murders, the British did not make tangible progress on the investigation. On July 4, officers at the Canadian Military Headquarters in London (CMHQ) decided to formally protest to the 21st Army Group that the file "had been badly handled", and lobbied for a court of inquiry to be convened "at the earliest possible moment." However, such a step was not taken until General Eisenhower — Supreme Commander of the Allied Expeditionary Force in Europe — heard about the murders and ordered the creation of a court of inquiry on July 8. The court of inquiry completed its interim report on July 15, and said that arrest warrants should be issued against four German suspects that it named. While this inquiry was still ongoing, bodies from additional incidents were being discovered, further adding to the pressure to uncover the perpetrators.

On August 20, 1944, Eisenhower approved the creation of a permanent standing court of inquiry to investigate the atrocities, after it became clear that these executions were not isolated and unrelated from one-another. The court investigated 25 instances of war crimes during its seven months of existence; five cases involved Canadian victims, and three of these entailed the 12th SS Panzer Division's atrocities during the Battle of Normandy. The material found during these investigations was used in a report on the 12th SS Panzer Division's crimes against POWs at Normandy, which was submitted by the prosecution during the Nuremberg Trials.

The standing court of inquiry ultimately estimated that 103 Canadians were murdered during the Normandy massacres, but this was before all of the atrocities had been reported, and more bodies were found. The court further recommended that due to the criminal behaviour that was common among the 12th SS Panzer Division's officers, Meyer, Mohnke, Bremer, Milius, and Muller be charged with denying quarter to the enemy, and failing to prevent violations against prisoners by the men under their command. It also recommended that several officers and non-commissioned men be charged with committing murder or being accessories to murder. Lastly, the court recommended that no members of the 12th SS Panzer Division be released from captivity until they were "thoroughly interrogated" about the murders. At that same time however, on April 1, 1945, the Supreme Allied Headquarters shut down the standing court so that America could investigate its own cases, due to political pressure following the Malmedy Massacre. This meant that Canada would once again need to undertake the work to bring the perpetrators to justice.

=== Creation of a Canadian investigation unit ===
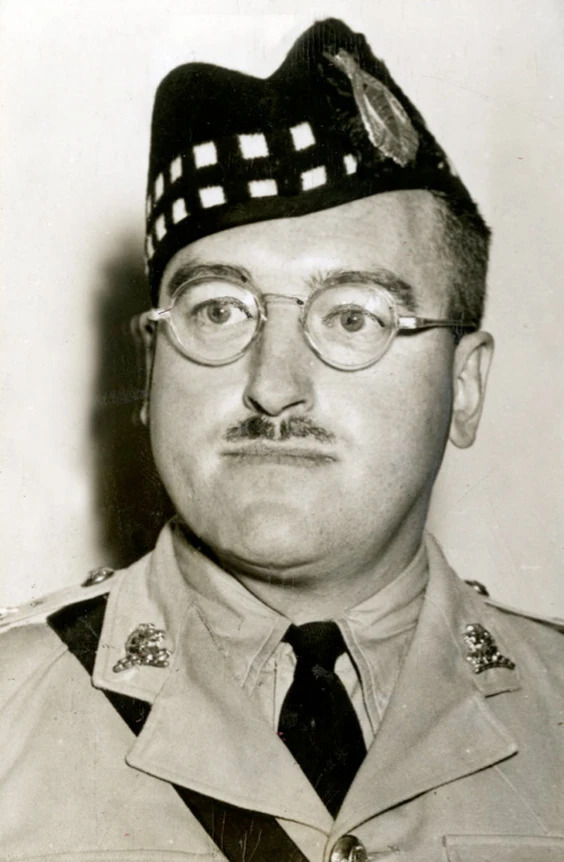
Lieutenant Colonel Bruce J.S. Macdonald

The Canadian public knew about the atrocities by spring 1945, but the Canadian government did not have the capacity to undertake investigations and prosecutions at the scale that America did. The government, as well as most officers in the CMHQ, were opposed to the creation of an independent Canadian war crimes body. The prevailing view was that Canadian interests would be adequately represented in a British investigatory body. Lieutenant colonel Bruce J.S. Macdonald, a Canadian who was posted to the soon-to-be-defunct standing court of inquiry, feared that the work they achieved to date would be wasted. Macdonald warned the CMHQ that their work was not nearly complete, and that the British 21st Army Group would not conduct the work that was needed to address these atrocities. He also met with members of staff for General Harry Crerar, commander of the First Canadian Army. After Macdonald's efforts, the CMHQ recommended to the government that Canada should create its own war crimes investigatory body. On June 4, 1945, No. 1 Canadian War Crimes Investigation Unit (CWCIU) was formed.

Much of the case against Meyer rested on the testimony of SS private Jan Jesionek, who overheard Meyer dissuade the taking of prisoners, and witnessed the second round of executions at the Ardenne Abbey soon after. Macdonald was given a copy of Jesionek's initial statement about the massacre by a third party and tracked him down in Marseilles. Jesionek was first questioned on May 28, 1945. In order to validate Jesionek's credibility, the CWCIU team questioned him in trial-like conditions, and Macdonald took him to the Abbey to reenact the events of June 8, 1944; he succeeded on both tests without issue. He was also able to identify where the seven bodies were buried.

The next challenge for Macdonald was to establish a link between Meyer's incitement of murder and the murders that actually took place. On June 24, 1945, Macdonald and his team traveled to POW camps across Canada and the United States, interviewing 99 German witnesses and 15 Canadian witnesses. These interviews were of limited value; many survivors of the Normandy massacres did not get a good look at the perpetrators, while many SS men still felt bound by their loyalty oaths or were unapologetic altogether. This changed in August 1945, when the government passed legislation that made it a crime to be part of a unit that committed a war crime, or to be in command of soldiers who committed war crimes.

Meyer told investigators that in early June 1944, he was informed by two officers that the bodies of 18 or 19 Canadians lay unburied in the abbey's garden. After a subordinate confirmed their presence, he looked for himself and relieved his subordinate for allowing those killings to happen. Finally, he reported the killings to his superior, SS Brigadier General Witt, who ordered him to identify the killers. Meyer claimed that he did not disclose this in a previous interrogation out of shame for what Germans had done. Macdonald located a 14-year-old boy who recounted playing in the garden of the abbey at the same time as Meyer's story took place, but the boy did not see any bodies. With his version of events proven wrong, Meyer was flown to the town of Aurich, in Germany, where his trial would take place.

== War crimes trials ==
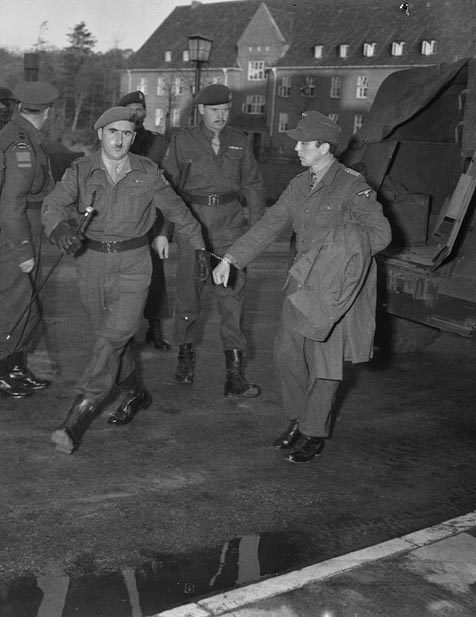
Kurt Meyer handcuffed to Maj. Arthur Russell as they arrive at Aurich barracks.

The trial against Meyer began on December 10, 1945, but had a rocky start; the prosecution's second witness did not show up, and the third witness initially faltered because he was directly facing Meyer, who shot him intimidating glares throughout his testimony. Over the next few days, the court heard from a mixture of German and Canadian witnesses who gave accurate accounts of the circumstances leading to, and during the atrocities, but none were able to establish a concrete link between the atrocities, and Meyer. Jesionek took the stand on December 13, but Macdonald directed him to wear an Allied uniform in order to appeal to the court. Most officials in the court commanded units during the war and were highly displeased to see a former SS soldier wearing an Allied uniform. Jesionek thought quickly and claimed he was given it by the Red Cross while in a British POW camp, and the members of the court accepted that answer. His testimony proved very important for the case, and Meyer's team failed to discredit him in cross-examination.

Closing addresses were delivered on December 27, 1945, and the court reached its decision in just under three hours. Meyer was found guilty on three of the five counts he was charged with. The court sentenced him to death by firing squad, and the date was subsequently set at January 7, 1946. Major General Christopher Vokes rejected Meyer's appeal but postponed the execution on January 5 after Montgomery inquired about British involvement in reviewing the appeal. The Canadian government sent a legal representative to a conference in London, where it was decided to commute Meyer's sentence to life in prison. This decision was met by outrage in Canada, as members of the public, Canadian Legion branches, the media, and the Conservative opposition ridiculed Prime Minister William Mackenzie King's government about the verdict. Vokes, who ordered the Razing of Friesoythe in 1945, justified the reduction in Meyer's sentence by writing:

There isn't a general or colonel on the Allied side that I know of who hasn't said, 'Well, this time we don't want any prisoners.'

No other Germans were tried by a Canadian court for their roles in the Normandy massacres. This was partly due to the military's indifference toward the realm of war crimes. Already in November 1945, CMHQ staff were asking Macdonald when he thought the CWCIU would be finished with its work. Macdonald said he did not know, because his unit had 81 cases to investigate. In response, the Chief of Staff at the CMHQ gave Macdonald a deadline of May 1, 1946, when the CWCIU would be dissolved and its investigations and trials would wrap up. The Chief of Staff claimed that this was because

...After a year and a half of investigating, including six months by this large and expensive unit [the CWCIU], we have so far succeeded in bringing one single German to trial, and we are not all sure that we are going to be able to hang him.

=== Final investigations ===
During the period between Meyer's trial and the CWCIU's dissolution, it tried three cases involving war crimes against Canadian airmen; all three trials resulted in convictions of the six defendants. Four of them were executed and the other two received prison sentences. The Canadian Cabinet approved the dissolution of the CWCIU on May 6, 1946, and it was dissolved on May 31. Eleven of its staff members formed a Canadian contingent in the British war crimes investigation unit but they were not assigned any cases related to the Normandy massacres. The British and Canadian governments remained indifferent to the efforts of Canadian prosecutors; Britain prioritized cases involving British servicemen, while Canada had other priorities.

The dissolution of the CWCIU also lead to the disposal of a number of items and documents that were seen as surplus, because no departments felt responsible for them. When the British apprehended former SS Captain Gerd von Reitzenstein in 1947, they requested evidence about the Chateau d'Audrieu killings. Officials at the Department of National Defence spent months looking for a box that was thought to contain bullets from the bodies of the murdered soldiers, live German ammunition, fingerprints and other important forensic evidence but the search failed.

Canadian investigators tried for almost a year to arrange a transfer with the Soviets, who held Mohnke in captivity. They offered the Soviets Meyer, who served on the Eastern Front, in exchange for Mohnke, who did not. The British accidentally repatriated an important witness against Mohnke to Europe, and the Department of External Affairs was unwilling to proceed with the negotiations. The British war crimes office closed in 1948, and von Reitzenstein was released without charge as a result. This marked the end of contemporary efforts to bring the perpetrators of the Normandy massacres to justice.

Meyer was the last German war criminal to be imprisoned outside of Germany by 1951 and the German government wanted him returned. The Canadian government repatriated Meyer to a military prison in Werl on October 19, 1951, to improve its relations with Germany. Canadian society was divided between supporters of clemency who felt that Meyer could play an important role in a new German or European military to counter the Soviet Union or questioned the fairness of his trial and opponents who did not want him let off the hook for the Ardenne Abbey murders. The German government voiced its desire to grant him clemency and the Canadian Cabinet gave its approval in January 1954. Meyer officially gained his freedom on September 7, 1954, nine years after he was imprisoned. He was met in his home town of Niederkruchten by a crowd of 5,000 SS veterans and supporters who lined the town's main street — many holding burning torches. He joined the Waffen SS Veterans Association, found a job selling beer to Canadian soldiers stationed in Germany and remained unrepentant for the crimes that he and his men committed.
