= Colette Marin-Catherine =

French resistance fighter (born 1929)

- Born: 25 April 1929 (age 96); Bretteville-l'Orgueilleuse

Colette Marin-Catherine (born 25 April 1929), is a French resistance fighter from Bretteville-l'Orgueilleuse. She joined the Resistance in the summer of 1944 where she was a reconnaissance agent and then a nurse after the Normandy landings; also resistant, her brother Jean-Pierre Catherine was arrested in 1943 and died in the Mittelbau-Dora concentration camp in 1945.

After the war, she pursued memorial work. She rose to prominence when Anthony Giacchino's short documentary Colette, which follows her on a visit to Dora's camp where her brother died, won the Oscar in its category at the 93rd Academy Awards.

== Biography ==
=== Origins ===
Colette Marin-Catherine was born in 1929 in Calvados in Normandy, in the village of Bretteville-l'Orgueilleuse where her family resided. She describes the town as "a large town, with a notary, a doctor, a pharmacist, four chateau owners. And farms and farm workers around”. Her parents ran an automobile sales, repair and transport business.

=== World War II ===
Still a high school student, and 16-year old Colette Marin-Catherine joined the French Resistance around Caen as a reconnaissance agent. Her father, brother and mother are also members of the Resistance. During the summer of 1944, she helped care for wounded civilians. Her mother ran a sort of first aid post at the back of their house. On June 6, 1944, D-day, as they evacuated the village in the direction of Bayeux, they were requisitioned by a doctor from the temporary military hospital of the Bayeux seminary (called Robert-Lion after D-Day). For four months, Colette Marin-Catherine worked there as a nurse, without diploma or training, day or night. She testified: “My job was cleaning, caring, dressing. There was no question of saying that I couldn't do it or that I was afraid. If my mother gave me an order, I had to carry it out immediately."

Her brother Jean-Pierre Catherine, born in 1926 and a student at the school for aspirants of the Merchant Navy in Caen, joined the Resistance in 1940 at 13 years old with a group of comrades from Bretteville-l'Orgueilleuse and Putot-en-Bessin. They distributed newspapers, leaflets, hid weapons and helped opponents to camouflage themselves. On November 11, 1942, they flowered the war memorials. For this fact, Jean-Pierre Catherine was arrested eight months later. He was imprisoned in Caen, where he was sentenced to forced labor. First sent to the Natzweiler-Struthof concentration camp in annexed Alsace, he was deported when he was 17 to the Mittelbau-Dora concentration camp in Germany, a camp specializing in the manufacture of V-2 rockets. under extremely harsh working conditions. He died of exhaustion on March 22, 1945, at just 19 years old. Another brother, named Gaston, thirteen years older than Colette Marin-Catherine, dies on his return from deportation.

=== After the War ===
On September 28, 1944, Colette Marin-Catherine and her mother left the Bayeux military hospital and returned home for the first time since D-Day. They had to walk for fifteen kilometers. They found their house squatted, looted and in poor condition.

The family garage, without an employee, was closed. In order to support herself and her sick 60-year-old mother, Colette Marin-Catherine worked as a nurse and seamstress in the village, selling vegetables, chickens and rabbits. She earned little and had to repair the house, which had no more windows and holes in the roof. In April 1945, they still had no news of the father and the sons. When they learned of the death of Jean-Pierre Catherine: “We were so closed to our grief that we turned in on ourselves. In the village, no one wanted to hang out with a grieving family. "

She attended the municipal elections of April 29, 1945, where women could vote for the first time in France. Seventy years after the event, she described the voters “intimidated” by the “village aristocracy”: “It was a party, and at the same time, it was impressive. Many had a folded ballot in their hands. The parish priest or the husband gave instructions ... ”A woman was elected head of the village in 1947. Colette Marin-Catherine voted for the first time in Caen in the 1951 French legislative election. She has participated in every ballot since, without discontinue, claiming to have "fought for it".

Colette Marin-Catherine testified to having "started to earn well [her] living" after having learned to re-thread the stockings. She took care of her mother until her death. She was then 40 years old and never married. She exercised the profession of manager of hotel establishments.

=== Memorial work ===
From the 2010s, Colette Marin-Catherine regularly lectured during tours in Normandy organized by The National WWII Museum in New Orleans, mainly in Caen at Mémorial de Caen and at Café Mancel and receives Americans on each anniversary of the D-Day.

In 2018, the American director Anthony Giacchino and the French producer Alice Doyard were in Normandy to make portraits of resistance fighters. They met Colette Marin-Catherine, established in Caen, through the guide Christophe Gosselin. Discovering "her aura in front of the camera, but also her desire to transmit the memory of her brother", according to the words of Alice Doyard, they had the idea of making a film. At the same time, they met the historian Laurent Thierry, present at La Coupole memorial center in Pas-de-Calais and coordinator of the biographical dictionary Livre des 9 000 déportés de France à Mittelbau-Dora and the student Lucie Fouble, responsible for writing the biographical notice of Jean-Pierre Catherine.

The following year, Colette Marin-Catherine, aged 92, accompanied by Lucie Foulbe, went to Germany for the first time. She followed in her brother's footsteps, especially in Dora. She testified about her visit to the camp:

Everything was hard. I took it right in the face, or in the heart, it's more elegant. When I entered the crematorium, you have this kind of stretcher made only of metal on which the bodies were put in the oven. This is really where I saw my brother go. I saw a lot of documents about that war, but when I was in the tunnel I heard thousands of voices. I'm not Joan of Arc, but it's so overwhelming you feel like someone is pushing you all around.

The film, lasting twenty-five minutes, was released in 2020 on The Guardian digital platform. It won awards at several American festivals before being awarded the Academy Award for Best Documentary (Short Subject) at the 93rd Academy Awards.

The team of the film offered Colette Marin-Catherine a commemorative paving stone in memory of her brother, called Stolperstein, made by the German artist Gunter Demnig. It was sealed on November 11, 2019, in front of the family home in Bretteville-l'Orgueilleuse. This was the first Stolperstein affixed in Normandy.
