= Nami Melumad =

Israeli film and television composer based in Los Angeles

Nami Melumad נמי מלומד
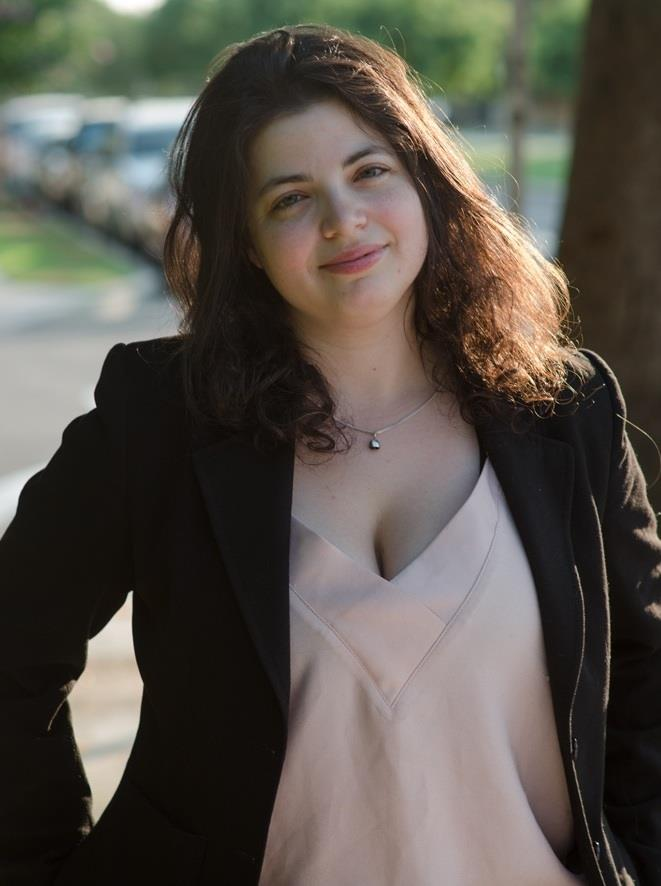

Background information
- Born: Naama Melumad; December 5, 1988 (age 37); Ramat Gan, Israel
- Genres: Film and television music
- Occupation: Composer

Naama "Nami" Melumad (Hebrew: נעמה (נמי) מלומד; born December 5, 1988) is an Israeli-Dutch film and television composer, conductor, flautist, and pianist based in Los Angeles. Melumad is best known for her work on Paramount+'s series Star Trek: Strange New Worlds and Star Trek: Prodigy, Pixar's Dream Productions, Marvel's Thor: Love and Thunder, the HBO Max film An American Pickle, the Amazon TV series Absentia and the virtual reality video game Medal of Honor: Above and Beyond.

== Early life and career ==
Nami Melumad at the 2026 New York Film Festival for Behemoth!

Melumad was born and raised in Ramat Gan, Israel. She attended Blich High School where she majored in music theory, composition, flute performance, and chemistry. While at school, she began developing an interest in film scoring and also wrote the score for a children's theatre play. She played classical piano, flute, and guitar. Upon completing her military service in the Israel Defense Forces, Melumad was accepted directly to the sophomore year at the Cross-Disciplinary Composition Division of the Jerusalem Academy of Music and Dance and earned a Bachelor of Music in composition. Among her teachers were Ioseb Bardanashvili, Michael Wolpe and Rafi Kadishzon. She composed mainly for documentary films, short-form narratives, commercials and stage moved to Los Angeles in 2014 to attend the graduate program in scoring for motion pictures and television (previously known as SMPTV) at the Thornton School of Music at the University of Southern California.

Melumad has scored over 150 projects, including feature films, TV series, short films and more. She is the first woman to score an episode in the Star Trek franchise, the Star Trek: Short Treks episode, "Q&A" and won several awards for her work including the Hollywood Music in Media Awards for Passage (2018), Best Short Score at Fimucité (2017) out of 908 scores and The Marshall Hawkins Award-Best Original Score at Idyllwild Festival of Cinema in 2018. Her score for Over the Wall earned her a nomination at the XIV Jerry Goldsmith Awards in 2019.

She was one of the 12 composers around the world to make the cut for the acclaimed ASCAP 2016 film scoring workshop with composer Richard Bellis. In October 2016, her score to Mindgame was performed live-to-picture by the Helix Collective Ensemble, at the Ebell Theatre in Los Angeles. In May 2017, her work New Zealand's Guide To Tessering was performed by the Hollywood Chamber Orchestra. As an orchestrator, she worked on The Little Mermaid and Logic's album Everybody.

In 2019, Melumad created original music for Senior Love Triangle.

Melumad is a board member of Women in Film (Los Angeles), and a board member of the Alliance for Women Film Composers, where she initiated a mentorship program. She is also a board member of ASMAC, and a voting member of the Television Academy. In June 2025, Melumad was invited to join as a member of the Academy of Motion Picture Arts and Sciences

== Selected discography ==
As Composer

- Loving Dory (upcoming Pixar film) (TBA) (Film)
- Ali G: Who Iz I? (upcoming film) (2026) (Film)
- Babies (2026) (Film)
- Behemoth! (2026) (Film)
- Dream Productions (2024) (TV Series)
- One Fast Move (2024) (Film)
- Griffin in Summer (2024) (Film)
- Thor: Love and Thunder (2022) – in collaboration with Michael Giacchino
- Star Trek: Strange New Worlds (2022–present) (TV Series)
- The Woman in the House Across the Street from the Girl in the Window (2022) (TV Series)
- Far from the Tree (2021)
- Star Trek: Prodigy (2021–2022) (TV Series)
- Medal of Honor: Above and Beyond (2020) – (video game) in collaboration with Michael Giacchino
- An American Pickle (2020) – *based on original themes by Michael Giacchino
- Anastasia: Once Upon a Time (2020) - with Jeremy Rubolino
- Absentia (2019–2020) (TV Series, Amazon/Sony)
- Star Trek: Short Treks: "Q & A" (2019) (TV Episode, CBS/The Secret Hideout)
- Dead End (2019) (TV Series, Kan)
- More Beautiful for Having Been Broken (2019)
- Senior Love Triangle (2019)
- Before the Dawn (2019)
- Miss Arizona (2018) (Side Gig Productions)
- Subira (2018)
- The Adventures of Thomasina Sawyer (2018)
- Trico Tri Happy Halloween (2018)
- Church & State (Documentary) (2018)
- This Day Forward (2018)
- Passage (Short Film) (2018)
- The Big Nothing (2017) (TV Series, Israel's YES Kidz Channel)

== Awards and nominations ==
| Year | Result | Award | Category | Work |
|---|---|---|---|---|
| 2025 | Nominated | Children and Family Emmy | Outstanding Show Open | Dream Productions |
| 2025 | Nominated | Children and Family Emmy | Outstanding Music Direction and Composition for an Animated Program | Dream Productions - Part 4: A Night to Remember |
| 2024 | Nominated | International Film Music Critics Association Award | Best Original Score for a Short Film | The Ice Cream Man |
| 2024 | Nominated | The Society of Composers and Lyricists (SCL) Awards | Outstanding Original Title Sequence for a Television Production | Dream Productions |
| 2023 | Won | The Society of Composers and Lyricists (SCL) Awards | David Raksin Award for Emerging Talent | Star Trek: Strange New Worlds |
| 2023 | Nominated | Children's and Family Emmy Awards | Outstanding Sound Editing and Sound Mixing for an Animated Program (As Music Editor) | Star Trek: Prodigy |
| 2022 | Nominated | HMMA | Score – Sci-Fi Film | Thor: Love and Thunder |
| 2021 | Won | BMI Film & TV Awards | BMI Film Music Award- Film Festival Short | Colette |
| 2020 | Nominated | International Film Music Critics Association Award | Breakthrough Composer of the Year | |
| 2020 | Nominated | International Film Music Critics Association Award | Best Original Score for a Comedy Film | An American Pickle |
| 2020 | Won | International Film Music Critics Association Award | Best Original Score for a Video Game or Interactive Media | Medal of Honor: Above and Beyond |
| 2019 | Nominated | Jerry Goldsmith Awards | Best Score for a Short Film | Over the Wall |
| 2018 | Nominated | HMMA | Original Score – Independent Film | Miss Arizona |
| 2018 | Won | HMMA | Original Score – Short Film | Passage |
| 2017 | Nominated | HMMA | Original Score – Independent Film | This Day Forward |
| 2017 | Won | Fimucité | Best Original Score – Short Film | Luminaries |
