= Colette (2020 film) =

2020 documentary film by Anthony Giacchino

- Promotional poster
- Directed by: Anthony Giacchino
- Written by: Anthony Giacchino
- Produced by: Alice Doyard; Aaron Matthews; Annie Small
- Starring: Colette Marin-Catherine
- Cinematography: Rose Bush
- Edited by: Aaron Matthews
- Music by: Nami Melumad
- Production companies: Time Travel Unlimited; Oculus; Respawn Entertainment
- Distributed by: The Guardian
- Release date: February 16, 2020
- Running time: 24 minutes
- Country: United States
- Language: French

Colette is a 2020 French-language American documentary film directed by Anthony Giacchino and produced by Alice Doyard, Annie Small and Aaron Matthews.

== Plot ==
Together with aspiring historian Lucie Fouble, 90-year-old French Resistance fighter Colette Marin-Catherine travels to Nordhausen to visit Mittelbau-Dora concentration camp. Until then, she had avoided visiting the place where her brother, Jean-Pierre, died. The whole family was active in the resistance. She wrote down the registration numbers of passing trucks. Her brother had collected weapons for the resistance and was arrested in the process. He died in the concentration camp at the age of 19 as a result of forced labor combined with malnutrition. Because of her experiences, she avoided traveling to Germany. Fouble contacted her after researching her brother.

When they first meet, Fouble asks if they could take Jean-Pierre's photo on the trip. Colette tells how her father had hid a camera under his shirt while visiting in order to take the photo. While on the train to Nordhausen, Colette talks about how she felt distant from her brother, and describes how she felt guilty when her mother wished that she had been taken in place of Jean-Pierre. At Nordhausen, the former mayor wants to say a few words to Colette, but she interrupts him, saying that she is not feeling well. The next day, they visit the concentration camp's memorial site. They see the prison block that her brother likely slept in, as well as the tunnels where prisoners were forced to build V-2 rockets. While looking over the ruins of the prison block, Colette bursts into tears as she had forgotten to bring flowers for her brother. After visiting the camp's crematorium, she presents Fouble with a ring Jean-Pierre had made for her mother.

== Background ==
The film was directed by Anthony Giacchino and produced by Alice Doyard, Aaron Matthews, and Annie Small. It was released by The Guardian. The idea came to the team when they were filming a documentary about a U.S. World War II veteran who made an emergency landing in Normandy during Operation Overlord. Their guide introduced them to Colette Marin-Catherine. An interview ensued, but the filmmakers did not want a simple portrait. At first, they seemed unable to persuade Marin-Catherine to visit Mittelbau-Dora concentration camp because of her strong aversion to the place, or to Germany in general, and because she had spent 70 years trying to forget the past. During their research, however, they came across Lucie Fouble, a historian, who was doing research on her brother. With Fouble's support, they succeeded in making the film.

The filmmakers paid attention to reverence and gave Marin-Catherine the opportunity to determine when the camera should stop filming. Before each scene, they outlined how they would film that scene, but gave Fouble control over the scene and the freedom to express her feelings, as well as the final word.

== Accolades ==
It won the Academy Award for Best Documentary Short Subject at the 93rd Academy Awards. Co-produced by Oculus and Respawn Entertainment as part of the documentary gallery for the virtual reality video game Medal of Honor: Above and Beyond, Colette is the first film produced by a video game studio to win or be nominated for an Academy Award.
