= Saint-Manvieu-Norrey =

- Commune
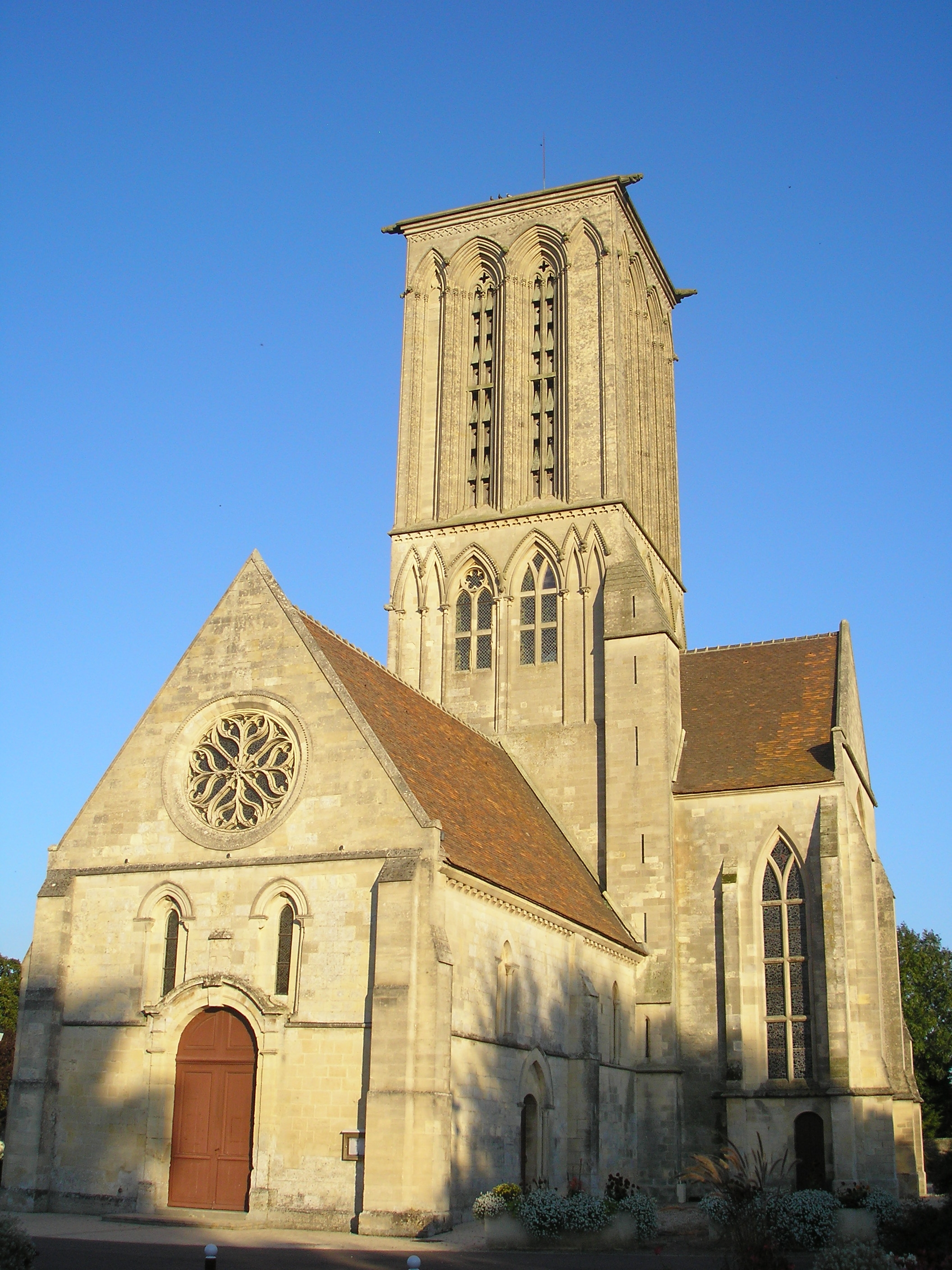
- The church in Saint-Manvieu-Norrey
- Location of Saint-Manvieu-Norrey
- Location within France Location within Normandy
- Coordinates: 49°10′53″N 0°30′00″W
- Country: France
- Region: Normandy
- Department: Calvados
- Arrondissement: Caen
- Canton: Thue et Mue
- Intercommunality: CU Caen la Mer

Government
  - Mayor (2020–2026): Léonie Angot-Hastain
- Area^{1}: 8.28 km^{2} (3.20 sq mi)
- Elevation: 82 m (269 ft)
- Highest elevation: 91 m (299 ft)
- Lowest elevation: 59 m (194 ft)
- Population (2023): 2,160
  - Density: 261/km^{2} (676/sq mi)
- Time zone: UTC+01:00 (CET)
  - Summer (DST): UTC+02:00 (CEST)
- INSEE/Postal code: 14610 /14740
- ^{1} French Land Register data, which excludes lakes, ponds, glaciers > 1 km^{2} (0.386 sq mi or 247 acres) and river estuaries.

Saint-Manvieu-Norrey (French: [sɛ̃ mɑ̃vjø nɔʁɛ]) is a commune in the Calvados department in the Normandy region in northwestern France.

== Name ==
The name of the locality is attested in the form S. Manveus around 840. Manvieu is a bishop of Bayeux of the 5th century. Concerning the merged commune, the locality is attested in the form Norreis in 1198 The toponym would come from the Latin nucarium, "walnut".

In 1926, the name of Bessin is deputy in the name of the commune.

== History ==
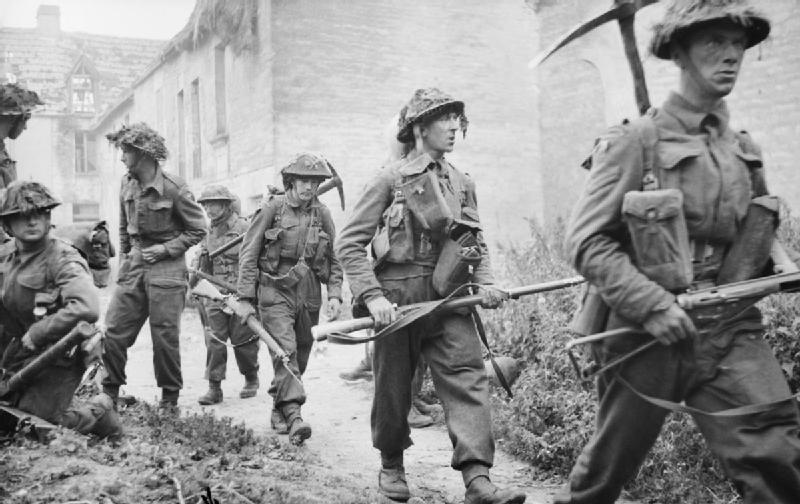
The troops of the Scottish 15th Infantry Division on the communal territory, 26 June 1944.

The town was liberated on 26 June 1944 as part of Operation Epsom by Scottish troops from the Lowland Infantry Brigade's 44th Infantry from the Scottish 15th Infantry Division after fierce fighting against SS4 troops.

As part of the Raymond Marcellin plan to reduce the number of municipalities, the commune of Norrey-en-Bessin (228 inhabitants in 1963), merged with that of Saint-Manvieu (611 inhabitants) on 1 July 1972. The mayors of the Mrs. Degasteblet for Norrey and Mr. Imhof for Saint-Manvieu.

The commune was formed in 1972, with the merger of the two former communes of Norrey-en-Bessin and Saint-Manvieu.

== Landmarks ==
- Manoir de la Mare today hosting a traditionalist Catholic high school. Built in the seventeenth century by Pierre le Marchand in a typical style of Bessin architecture, it is listed as a historical monument since 30 August 2000
- Notre-Dame-des-Labours Church of Norrey-en-Bessin (11th century), listed as a historical monument since 1840
- The old church Saint-Manvieu, located in the cemetery, built in the thirteenth century, rebuilt in the seventeenth century. The seigniorial chapel is listed as a historic monument since 24 January 1918 and the choir is inscribed since 16 May 1927, as was the bell tower destroyed in 1944
- Castle Marcelet, eighteenth century.
- Saint-Manvieu Church (20th century, Reconstruction).

== Population ==
Historical population
Year	Pop.	±% p.a.
1968	839	—
1975	950	+1.79%
1982	1,031	+1.18%
1990	1,291	+2.85%
1999	1,417	+1.04%
2007	1,725	+2.49%
2012	1,787	+0.71%
2017	1,927	+1.52%
2023	2,160	+1.92%
Source: INSEE

== Twin towns – sister cities ==
Saint-Manvieu-Norrey is twinned with:

- Unterpleichfeld, Germany since 1993 - Shared with two other communes Thue et Mue & Grainville-sur-Odon

== See also ==
- Communes of the Calvados department
- Operation Epsom
