= Unterpleichfeld =

- Municipality
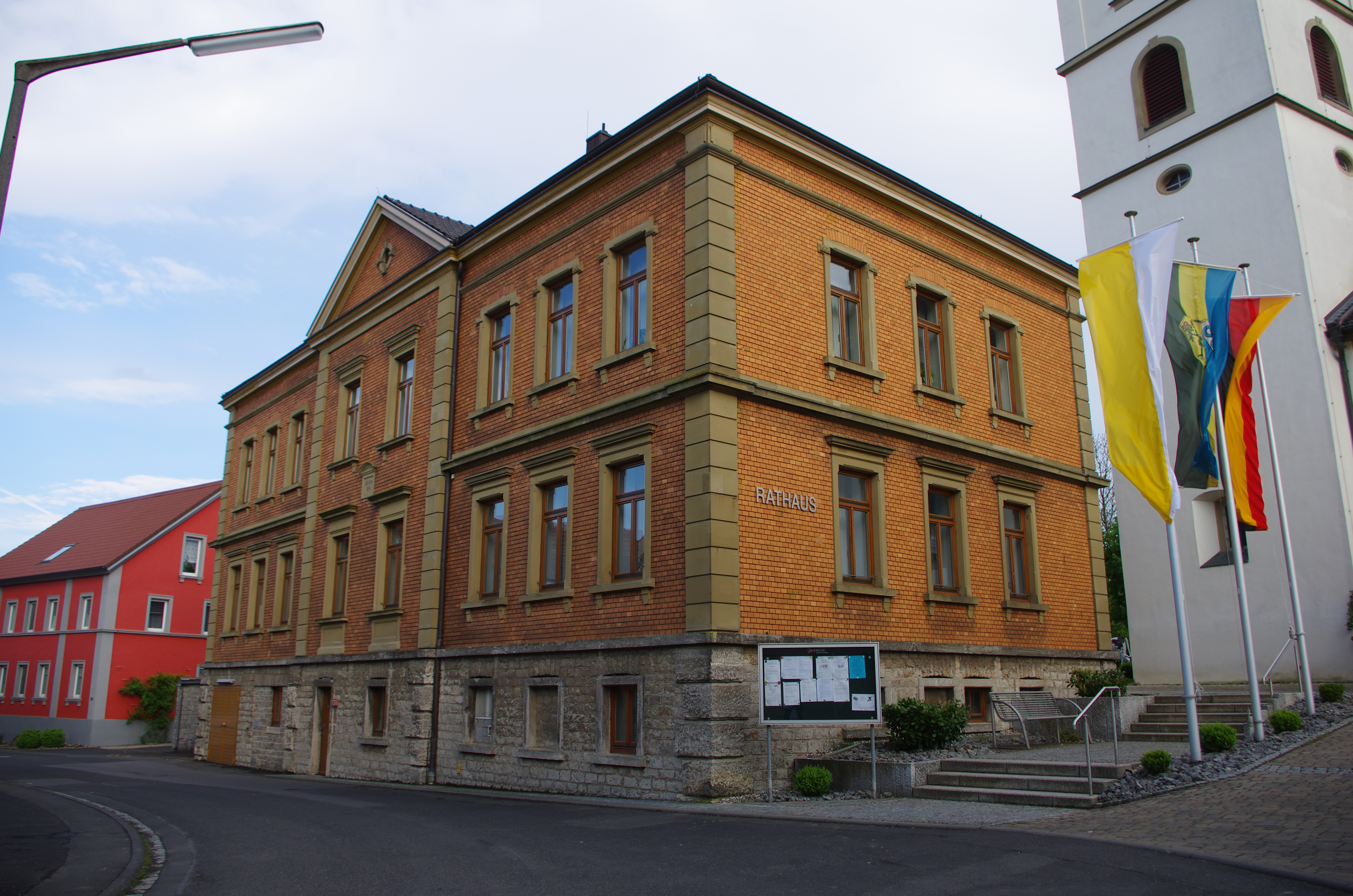
- Town hall

- Coat of arms

- Location of Unterpleichfeld within Würzburg district
- Interactive map of Unterpleichfeld
- Location within Germany Location within Bavaria
- Coordinates: 49°52′N 10°3′E
- Country: Germany
- State: Bavaria
- Admin. region: Unterfranken
- District: Würzburg

Government
  - Mayor (2020–26): Alois Fischer (FW)

Area
  - Total: 23.95 km^{2} (9.25 sq mi)
- Elevation: 265 m (869 ft)

Population (2025-12-31)
  - Total: 3,148
  - Density: 131.4/km^{2} (340.4/sq mi)
- Time zone: UTC+01:00 (CET)
  - Summer (DST): UTC+02:00 (CEST)
- Postal codes: 97294
- Dialling codes: 09367
- Vehicle registration: WÜ
- Website: www.unterpleichfeld.de

Unterpleichfeld is a municipality in the district of Würzburg in Bavaria, Germany.

== Twin towns – sister cities ==
Unterpleichfeld is twinned with:

- Saint-Manvieu-Norrey, France since 1993
- Thue et Mue, France since 1993
- Grainville-sur-Odon, France since 1993
