= Grainville-sur-Odon =

- Commune
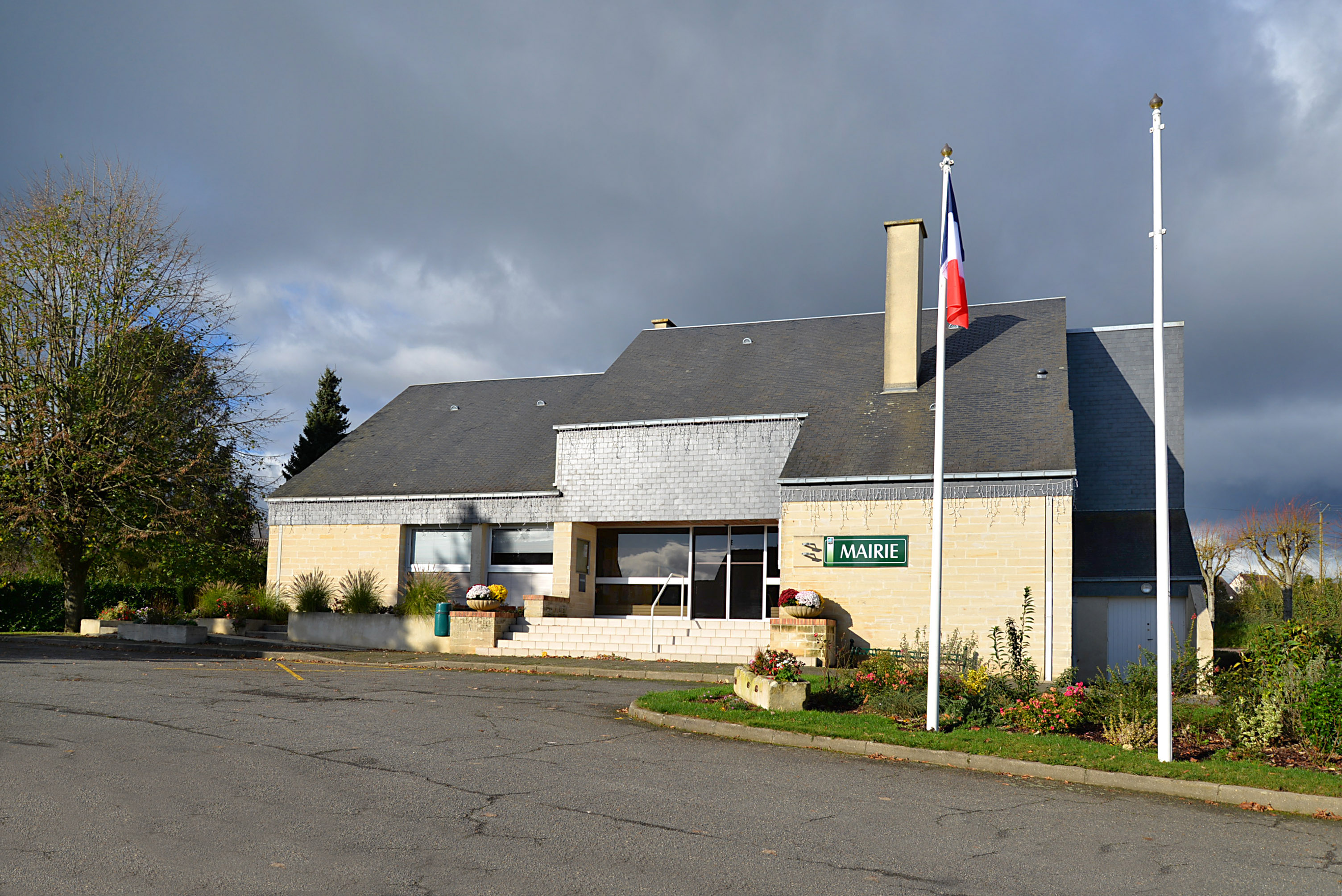
- The town hall in Grainville-sur-Odon

- Coat of arms
- Location of Grainville-sur-Odon
- Location within France Location within Normandy
- Coordinates: 49°08′20″N 0°31′42″W
- Country: France
- Region: Normandy
- Department: Calvados
- Arrondissement: Caen
- Canton: Évrecy

Government
  - Mayor (2020–2026): Emmanuel Maurice
- Area^{1}: 5.26 km^{2} (2.03 sq mi)
- Elevation: 115 m (377 ft)
- Highest elevation: 119 m (390 ft)
- Lowest elevation: 46 m (151 ft)
- Population (2023): 1,105
  - Density: 210/km^{2} (544/sq mi)
- Time zone: UTC+01:00 (CET)
  - Summer (DST): UTC+02:00 (CEST)
- INSEE/Postal code: 14311 /14210
- ^{1} French Land Register data, which excludes lakes, ponds, glaciers > 1 km^{2} (0.386 sq mi or 247 acres) and river estuaries.

Grainville-sur-Odon (French pronunciation: [ɡʁɛ̃vil syʁ ɔdɔ̃], literally Grainville on Odon) is a commune in the Calvados department in the Normandy region in northwestern France.

== Geography ==
The commune is made up of the following collection of villages and hamlets, Belleval, Grainville-sur-Odon, Le Valtru and Cayer.

The river Odon flows through the commune. In addition a stream the Ruisseau de Sabley traverses the commune.

== Population ==
Historical population
Year	Pop.	±% p.a.
1968	226	—
1975	281	+3.16%
1982	674	+13.31%
1990	779	+1.83%
1999	967	+2.43%
2007	1,003	+0.46%
2012	955	−0.98%
2017	1,037	+1.66%
2023	1,105	+1.06%
Source: INSEE

== Twin towns – sister cities ==
Grainville-sur-Odon is twinned with:

- Unterpleichfeld, Germany since 1993 - Shared with two other communes Thue et Mue & Saint-Manvieu-Norrey

== See also ==
- Grainville-Langannerie
- Communes of the Calvados department
- Operation Epsom
