= Thue et Mue =

- Commune
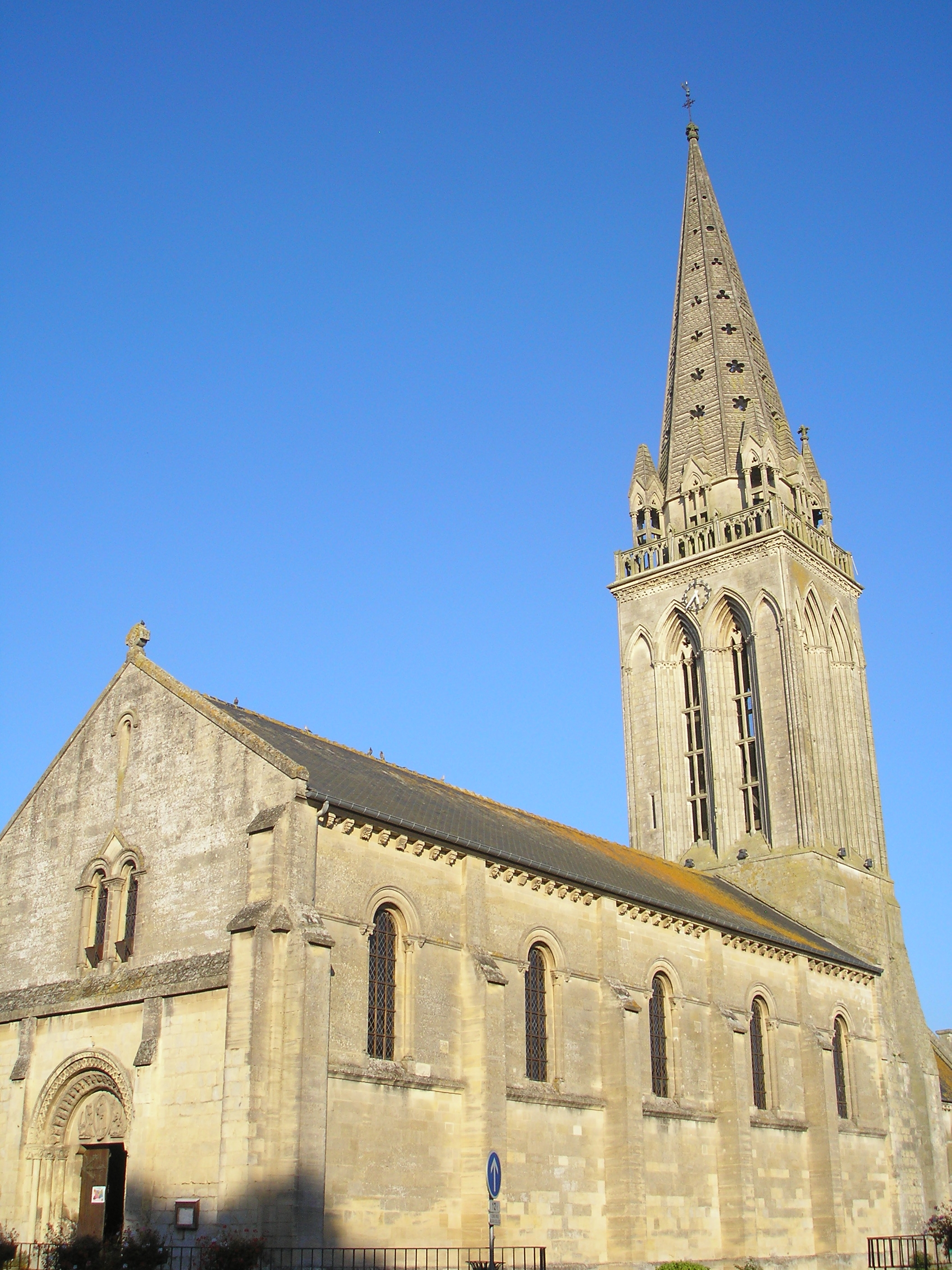
- The church in Bretteville-l'Orgueilleuse
- Location of Thue et Mue
- Location within France Location within Normandy
- Coordinates: 49°12′40″N 0°30′50″W
- Country: France
- Region: Normandy
- Department: Calvados
- Arrondissement: Caen
- Canton: Thue et Mue
- Intercommunality: CU Caen la Mer

Government
  - Mayor (2020–2026): Michel Lafont
- Area^{1}: 36.82 km^{2} (14.22 sq mi)
- Population (2023): 6,182
  - Density: 167.9/km^{2} (434.9/sq mi)
- Time zone: UTC+01:00 (CET)
  - Summer (DST): UTC+02:00 (CEST)
- INSEE/Postal code: 14098 /14740
- ^{1} French Land Register data, which excludes lakes, ponds, glaciers > 1 km^{2} (0.386 sq mi or 247 acres) and river estuaries.

Thue et Mue (French pronunciation: [ty e my], lit. 'Thue and Mue') is a commune in the department of Calvados, northwestern France. The municipality was established on 1 January 2017 by merger of the former communes of Bretteville-l'Orgueilleuse (the seat), Brouay, Cheux, Le Mesnil-Patry, Putot-en-Bessin and Sainte-Croix-Grand-Tonne.

== Geography ==
The commune is made up of the following collection of villages and hamlets, Putot-en-Bessin, L'Ormelaie, Brouay, Cardonville, Le Mesnil-Patry, Thue et Mue, Le Planitre, Le Rouitoir, Cheux, La Rue des Portes and Le Bosq.

Two rivers, the Thue and the Mue flow through the commune. In addition a stream the Ruisseau de Sabley traverses the commune.

== Population ==
Population data refer to the commune in its geography as of January 2025.

Historical population
Year	Pop.	±% p.a.
1968	2,288	—
1975	2,580	+1.73%
1982	3,002	+2.19%
1990	4,063	+3.86%
1999	4,635	+1.47%
2007	4,987	+0.92%
2012	5,263	+1.08%
2017	5,904	+2.33%
2023	6,182	+0.77%
Source: INSEE

== Points of interest ==
=== National heritage sites ===
The Commune has seven buildings and areas listed as a Monument historique

- Église Sainte-Croix de Sainte-Croix-Grand-Tonne a church listed as a monument in 1986.
- Église Notre-Dame-de-la-Nativité de Putot-en-Bessin a twelfth century church listed as a monument in 1927.
- Église Saint-Vigor de Cheux a twelfth century church listed as a monument in 1910.
- Église Saint-Germain a church listed as a monument in 1927.
- Cross a seventeenth century cross located in the cemetery of Église Notre-Dame-de-la-Nativité de Putot-en-Bessin.
- Château de Grand Tonne a seventeenth century Manor house, listed as a monument in 1969.
- Château de la Motte an eighteenth century Château, listed as a monument in 1973.

== Twin towns – sister cities ==
Thue et Mue is twinned with:

- Unterpleichfeld, Germany since 1993 - Shared with two other communes Grainville-sur-Odon & Saint-Manvieu-Norrey
- Long Bennington, England

== See also ==
- Communes of the Calvados department
