= Cheux =

- Part of Thue et Mue
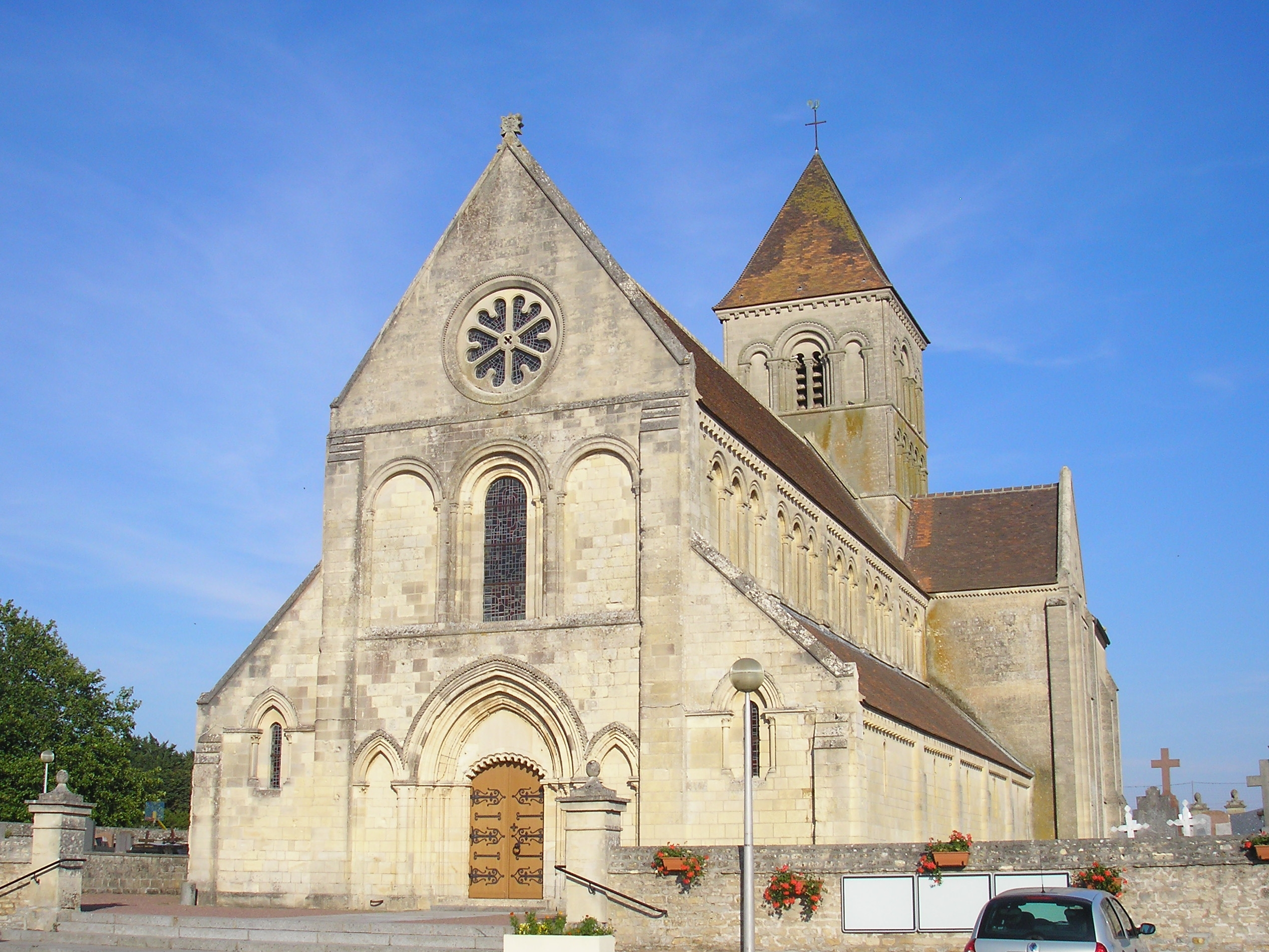

- Coat of arms
- Location of Cheux
- Location within France Location within Normandy
- Coordinates: 49°10′01″N 0°31′29″W
- Country: France
- Region: Normandy
- Department: Calvados
- Arrondissement: Caen
- Canton: Thue et Mue
- Commune: Thue et Mue
- Area^{1}: 14.38 km^{2} (5.55 sq mi)
- Elevation: 102 m (335 ft)
- Highest elevation: 119 m (390 ft)
- Lowest elevation: 62 m (203 ft)
- Population (2022): 1,526
  - Density: 106.1/km^{2} (274.8/sq mi)
- Time zone: UTC+01:00 (CET)
  - Summer (DST): UTC+02:00 (CEST)
- Postal code: 14210
- ^{1} French Land Register data, which excludes lakes, ponds, glaciers > 1 km^{2} (0.386 sq mi or 247 acres) and river estuaries.

Cheux (French pronunciation: [ʃø]) is a former commune in the Calvados department in the Normandy region in northwestern France. On 1 January 2017, it was merged into the new commune Thue et Mue.

== Population ==
Historical population
Year	Pop.	±% p.a.
1962	502	—
1968	523	+0.69%
1975	643	+2.99%
1982	816	+3.46%
1990	864	+0.72%
1999	1,085	+2.56%
2022	1,526	+1.49%
Source: EHESS and INSEE

== See also ==
- Communes of the Calvados department
