= Sainte-Croix-Grand-Tonne =

- Part of Thue et Mue
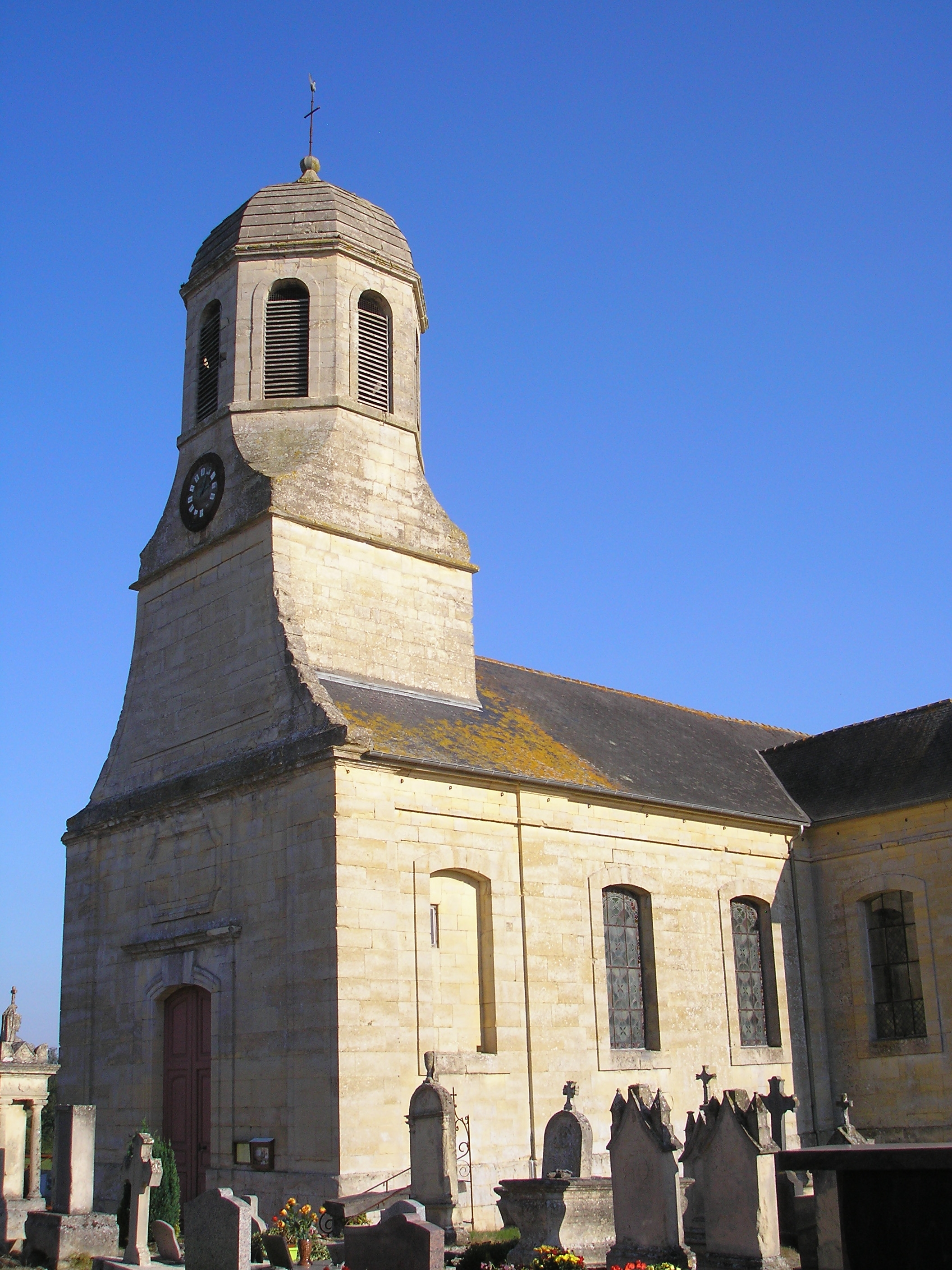
- Location of Sainte-Croix-Grand-Tonne
- Location within France Location within Normandy
- Coordinates: 49°13′57″N 0°33′43″W
- Country: France
- Region: Normandy
- Department: Calvados
- Arrondissement: Caen
- Canton: Thue et Mue
- Commune: Thue et Mue
- Area^{1}: 5.26 km^{2} (2.03 sq mi)
- Elevation: 60 m (200 ft)
- Highest elevation: 77 m (253 ft)
- Lowest elevation: 34 m (112 ft)
- Population (2023): 305
  - Density: 58.0/km^{2} (150/sq mi)
- Time zone: UTC+01:00 (CET)
  - Summer (DST): UTC+02:00 (CEST)
- Postal code: 14740
- ^{1} French Land Register data, which excludes lakes, ponds, glaciers > 1 km^{2} (0.386 sq mi or 247 acres) and river estuaries.

Sainte-Croix-Grand-Tonne (French pronunciation: [sɛ̃t kʁwa ɡʁɑ̃ tɔn]) is a former commune in the Calvados department in the Normandy region in northwestern France. On 1 January 2017, it was merged into the new commune Thue et Mue.

== See also ==
- Communes of the Calvados department
