= Anthony Giacchino =

American documentary filmmaker

Anthony Giacchino (/dʒəˈkiːnoʊ/ jə-KEE-noh, Italian: [dʒakˈkiːno]; born 1969) is an American documentary filmmaker.

Giacchino wrote and directed the 2007 documentary film The Camden 28, which was nominated for the Writers Guild of America Award for Best Documentary Screenplay. In 2020 he directed the documentary film Colette, co-produced by Oculus and Respawn Entertainment as part of the documentary gallery for the virtual-reality video game Medal of Honor: Above and Beyond. Colette won the Academy Award for Best Documentary Short Subject at the 93rd Academy Awards.

Giacchino is the younger brother of film director and composer Michael Giacchino, and the uncle of Mick Giacchino, who is also a composer. He grew up in Edgewater Park, New Jersey, attended Holy Cross High School and is a graduate of Villanova University. He has resided in Astoria, Queens.
