= Tenerife International Film Music Festival =

Annual festival for music in films

Coordinates: 28.456075°N 16.251281°W

- Location: Santa Cruz de Tenerife, Spain
- Founded: 2007
- Festival date: July
- Language: Spanish; English
- Website: www.fimucite.com

The Tenerife International Film Music Festival (Fimucité) (Spanish: Festival Internacional de Música de Cine de Tenerife) is an international film music festival that is held in Santa Cruz de Tenerife on the island of Tenerife in the Canary Islands.

The event brings industry leaders from both Europe and the Americas and often features music from award winning movies. The festival is held in important cultural centers throughout Santa Cruz de Tenerife including the Auditorio de Tenerife, Espacio Cultural CajaCanarias, Teatro Guimerá and Tenerife Espacio de las Artes.

== See also ==
- Santa Cruz de Tenerife
- Auditorio de Tenerife
- Orquesta Sinfónica de Tenerife
