= Alice Doyard =

French filmmaker (born 1972)

- Born: 1972 (age 53–54); Grenoble, France
- Occupations: Film director, producer

Alice Doyard (born 1972) is an Oscar winning French filmmaker. Her specialty is history and the effects of international conflict. She was made a Chevalier de l'Ordre des Arts et des Lettres by the French government in 2021. In the same year, she was named as one of the 50 Most Influential French People by Vanity Fair magazine.

== Early life and education ==
Doyard was born in Grenoble in 1972, one of four children of Jean Doyard, an engineer, and his wife Catherine, a freelance journalist. She moved to Paris in her early teens.

Doyard was educated at the Lycée Carnot in the 17th arrondissement of Paris. After obtaining her baccalaureate, she studied at Paris Dauphine University where she obtained bachelor's and master's degrees in Mathematics. She also studied media and cinema at De Paul University in Chicago.

Before becoming a filmmaker, Doyard worked in banking as a risk analyst and later as a statistician at the European Central Bank in Frankfurt.

== Work ==
She became a filmmaker in 2006, beginning as a researcher and assistant producer on documentary projects with the BBC, ARTE, ITV and others.

In 2021, Doyard won an Oscar for her work as creative producer on the film Colette, which follows the journey of a young historian from the north of France, Lucie Fouble, and Colette Marin-Catherine, a 92-year-old former Resistance member, who together retrace the journey of Colette's brother Jean-Pierre, who was deported to Nazi Germany at the age of 19. The film was distributed by Guardian Films of the United Kingdom and also won Best Documentary Short at the Big Sky Festival in Montana and the Young Cineastes Award at the Palm Springs International Film Festival.

In 2022, Doyard won the Foreign Press Association award for Best Documentary and Feature Story of the year for I Call Him By His Name, a BBC film she directed and produced about the war crimes committed in Bucha, Ukraine. For BBC2, she made Platform 5 – Escape from Ukraine, a film about the first days of the Russo-Ukrainian War, followed by Return to Platform 5 - Families at War in 2024.

In 2023, she produced and directed the BBC One programme Brave Britain with Fergal Keane, which saw the BBC reporter Fergal Keane revisit the people and locations from the three-part series Forgotten Britain for a second time, in places like Cornwall, Glasgow and Leeds.

In 2024, Doyard was nominated for an Emmy award as News Producer for the BBC. She has been deployed in Europe, Ukraine, the Middle East, the Congo, Zimbabwe and the Central African Republic, and was a member of the BBC team which won a Golden Nymph at the Monte Carlo Television Festival in 2018 for covering the fall of Robert Mugabe in Zimbabwe. She has also worked extensively for the BBC on terrorism and the European migrant crisis.

Her other credits include Living with PTSD (BBC), Remembering Nuremberg, 75 Years On (BBC), The Confined: A Story of Hidden Children (BBC), The Remarkable Resistance of Lilo (BBC), Resistance Women: The Fight Against Hitler in Berlin (BBC), World War One from Above (BBC), Teenage Tommies (BBC), Terres de Cinéma: Bridget Jones et London (Arte), Les Apprentis Sorciers du Climat/Clockwork Climate (Arte), Immortalité/Waiting for Immortality (Arte), and Enfants Forçats/Child Slave Labourers (Arte).

== Personal life ==
Alice Doyard is married to the author and war correspondent Fergal Keane. She is the mother of three daughters and has two step children. She lives between Paris and London.
