= Brouay =

- Part of Thue et Mue
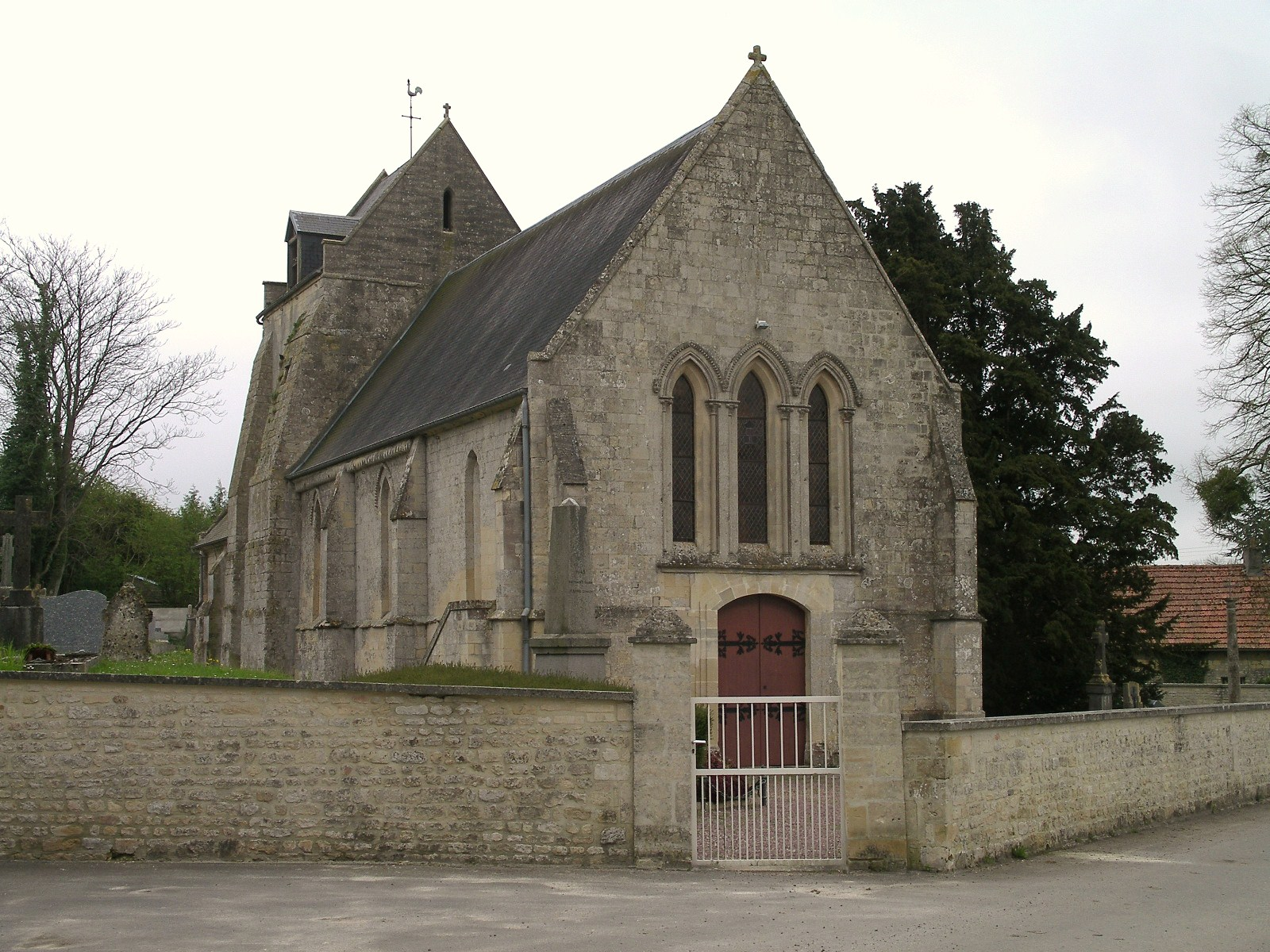
- Location of Brouay
- Location within France Location within Normandy
- Coordinates: 49°12′47″N 0°33′47″W
- Country: France
- Region: Normandy
- Department: Calvados
- Arrondissement: Caen
- Canton: Thue et Mue
- Commune: Thue et Mue
- Area^{1}: 3.98 km^{2} (1.54 sq mi)
- Elevation: 60 m (200 ft)
- Highest elevation: 84 m (276 ft)
- Lowest elevation: 50 m (160 ft)
- Population (2023): 461
  - Density: 116/km^{2} (300/sq mi)
- Time zone: UTC+01:00 (CET)
  - Summer (DST): UTC+02:00 (CEST)
- Postal code: 14250
- ^{1} French Land Register data, which excludes lakes, ponds, glaciers > 1 km^{2} (0.386 sq mi or 247 acres) and river estuaries.

Brouay (French pronunciation: [bʁuɛ]) is a former commune in the Calvados department in the Normandy region in northwestern France. On 1 January 2017, it was merged into the new commune Thue et Mue. There is a cemetery for war dead in the churchyard, with 377 graves of combatants killed during the Normandy campaigns - mostly from the United Kingdom.

== See also ==
- Brouay War Cemetery
- Communes of the Calvados department
