= Le Mesnil-Patry =

- Part of Thue et Mue
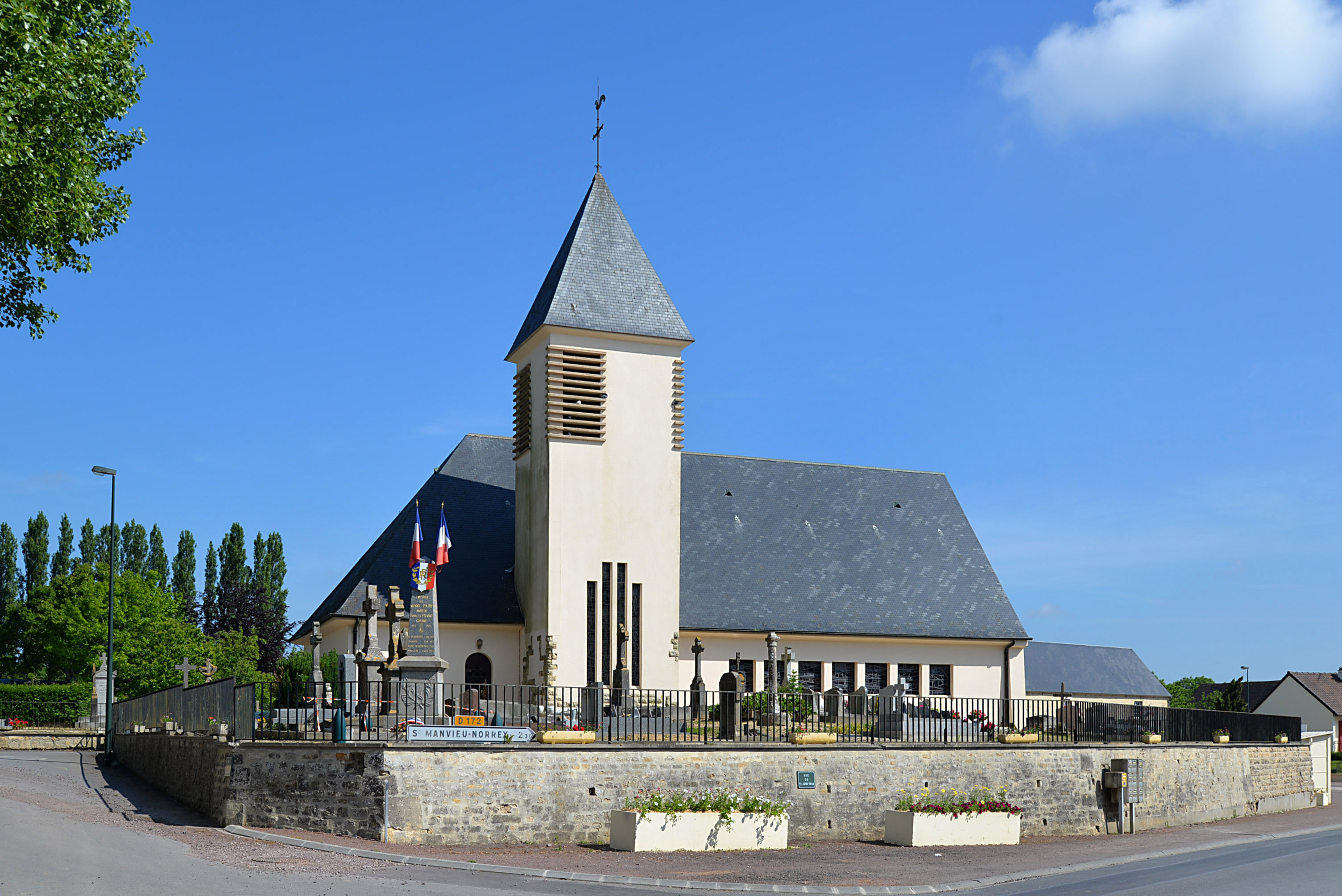
- Location of Le Mesnil-Patry
- Location within France Location within Normandy
- Coordinates: 49°11′45″N 0°32′37″W
- Country: France
- Region: Normandy
- Department: Calvados
- Arrondissement: Caen
- Canton: Thue et Mue
- Commune: Thue et Mue
- Area^{1}: 3.51 km^{2} (1.36 sq mi)
- Elevation: 80 m (260 ft)
- Highest elevation: 97 m (318 ft)
- Lowest elevation: 69 m (226 ft)
- Population (2023): 392
  - Density: 112/km^{2} (289/sq mi)
- Time zone: UTC+01:00 (CET)
  - Summer (DST): UTC+02:00 (CEST)
- Postal code: 14740
- ^{1} French Land Register data, which excludes lakes, ponds, glaciers > 1 km^{2} (0.386 sq mi or 247 acres) and river estuaries.

Le Mesnil-Patry (French pronunciation: [lə menil patʁi]) is a former commune in the Calvados department in the Normandy region in northwestern France. On 1 January 2017, it was merged into the new commune Thue et Mue.

== History ==
In World War II, on 11 June 1944 the Battle of Le Mesnil-Patry was fought to the east of the town, involving units of the 12th SS Panzer Division, 3rd Canadian Infantry Division and 2nd Canadian Armoured Brigade.

== See also ==
- Communes of the Calvados department
