= Bretteville-l'Orgueilleuse =

- Part of Thue et Mue
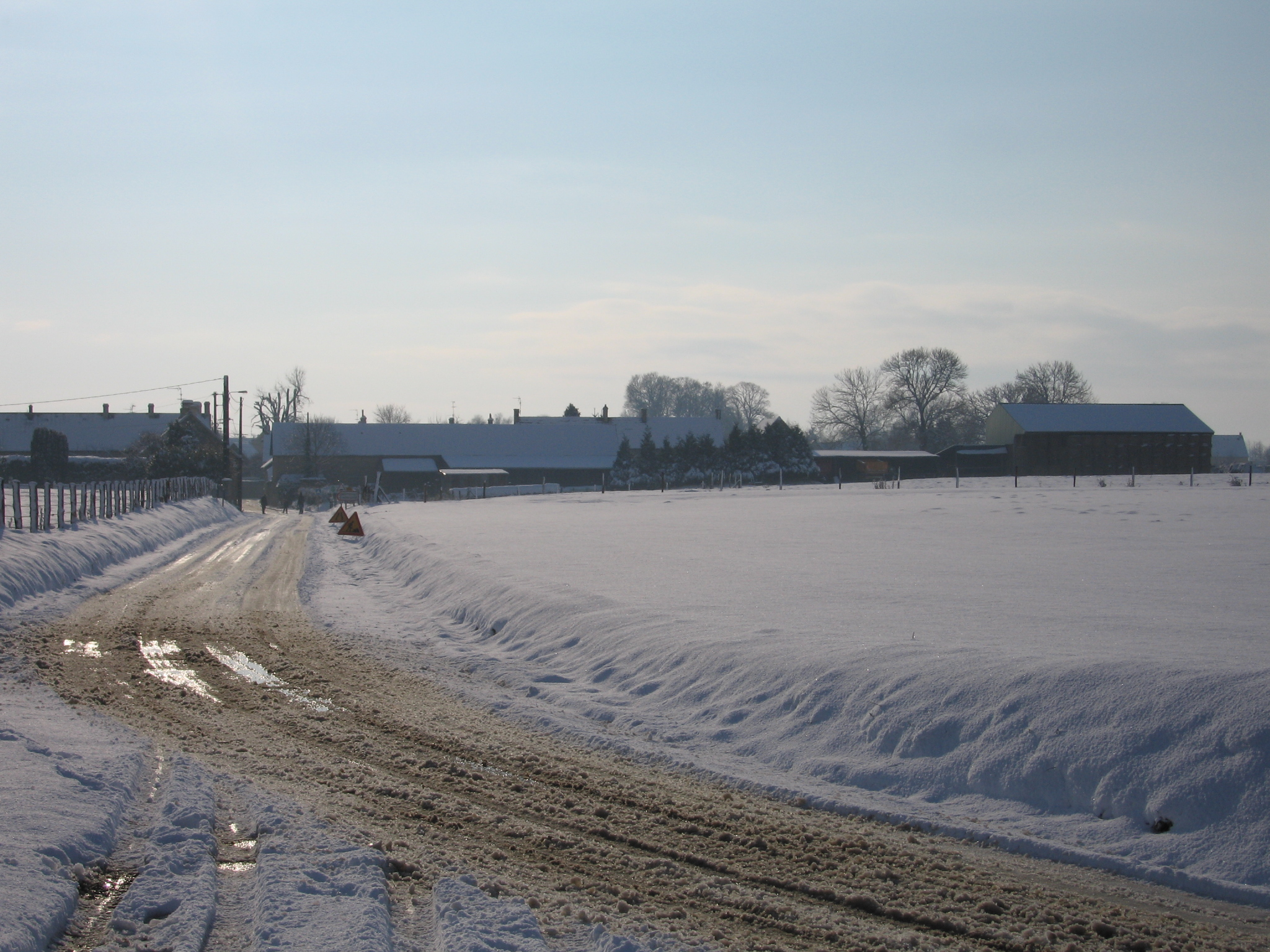
- Location of Bretteville-l'Orgueilleuse
- Location within France Location within Normandy
- Coordinates: 49°12′43″N 0°30′45″W
- Country: France
- Region: Normandy
- Department: Calvados
- Arrondissement: Caen
- Canton: Thue et Mue
- Commune: Thue et Mue
- Area^{1}: 6.18 km^{2} (2.39 sq mi)
- Elevation: 65 m (213 ft)
- Highest elevation: 72 m (236 ft)
- Lowest elevation: 47 m (154 ft)
- Population (2022): 3,078
  - Density: 498/km^{2} (1,290/sq mi)
- Time zone: UTC+01:00 (CET)
  - Summer (DST): UTC+02:00 (CEST)
- Postal code: 14740
- ^{1} French Land Register data, which excludes lakes, ponds, glaciers > 1 km^{2} (0.386 sq mi or 247 acres) and river estuaries.

Bretteville-l'Orgueilleuse (French pronunciation: [bʁɛtvil lɔʁɡœjøz]) is a former commune in the Calvados department in the Normandy region in northwestern France. On 1 January 2017, it was merged into the new commune Thue et Mue.

== Population ==
Historical population
Year	Pop.	±% p.a.
1962	761	—
1968	797	+0.77%
1975	1,009	+3.43%
1982	1,287	+3.54%
1990	2,177	+6.79%
1999	2,389	+1.04%
2022	3,078	+1.11%
Source: EHESS and INSEE

== See also ==
- Communes of the Calvados department
