= Putot-en-Bessin =

- Part of Thue et Mue
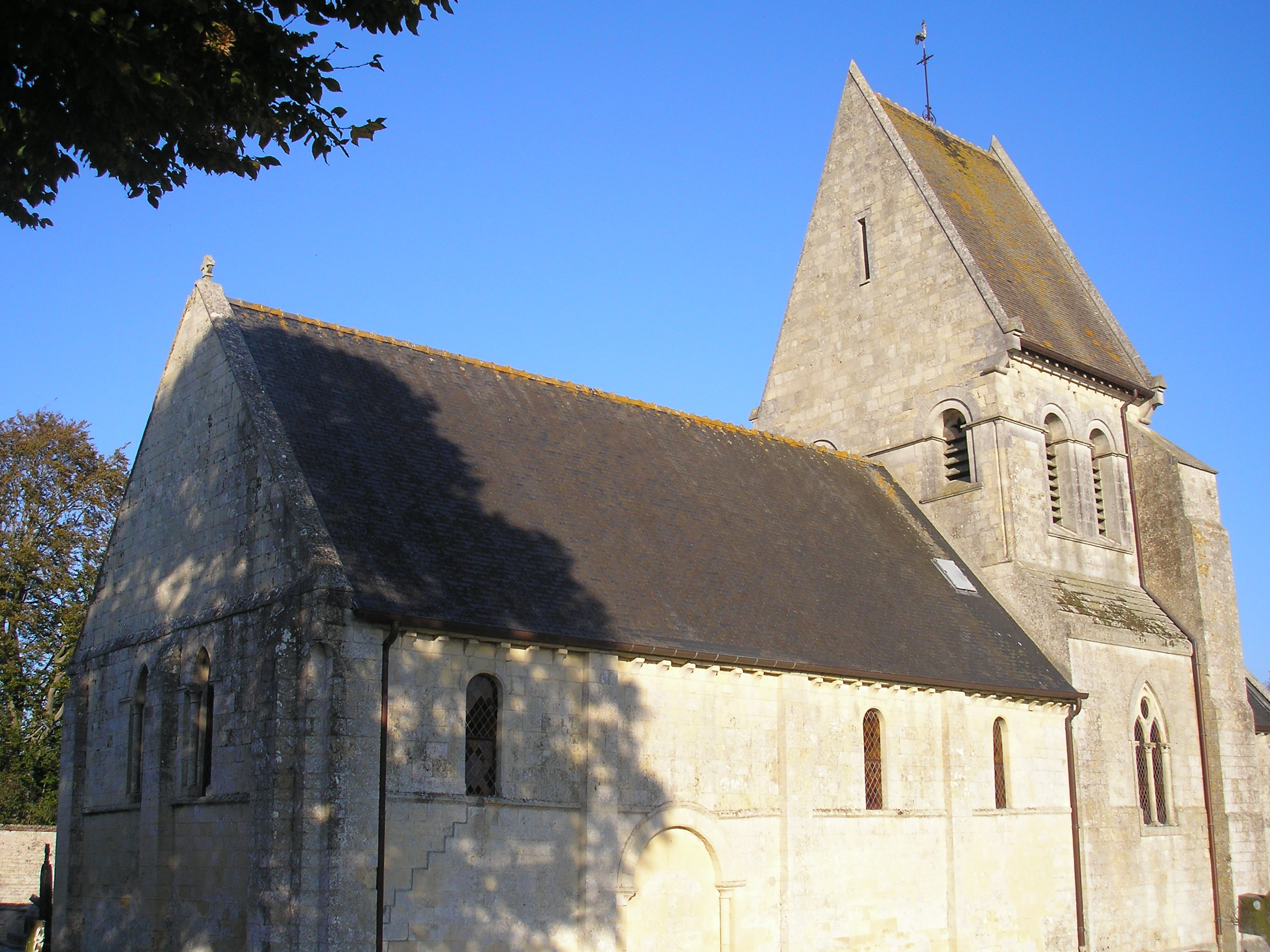
- Location of Putot-en-Bessin
- Location within France Location within Normandy
- Coordinates: 49°12′46″N 0°32′22″W
- Country: France
- Region: Normandy
- Department: Calvados
- Arrondissement: Caen
- Canton: Thue et Mue
- Commune: Thue et Mue
- Area^{1}: 3.51 km^{2} (1.36 sq mi)
- Highest elevation: 77 m (253 ft)
- Lowest elevation: 55 m (180 ft)
- Population (2023): 422
  - Density: 120/km^{2} (311/sq mi)
- Time zone: UTC+01:00 (CET)
  - Summer (DST): UTC+02:00 (CEST)
- Postal code: 14740
- ^{1} French Land Register data, which excludes lakes, ponds, glaciers > 1 km^{2} (0.386 sq mi or 247 acres) and river estuaries.

Putot-en-Bessin (French pronunciation: [pyto ɑ̃ bɛsɛ̃], literally Putot in Bessin) is a former commune in the Calvados department in the Normandy region in northwestern France. On 1 January 2017, it was merged into the new commune Thue et Mue.

== See also ==
- Communes of the Calvados department
