= 202nd Independent Infantry Brigade (Home) =

- Active: 20 October 1940 – 22 December 1941
- Country: United Kingdom
- Branch: British Army
- Type: Infantry Brigade
- Role: Home Defence

The 202nd Independent Infantry Brigade (Home) was a short-lived Home Defence formation of the British Army during the Second World War.

== Origin and Service ==
The 202nd Independent Infantry Brigade (Home) was formed for service in the United Kingdom on 20 October 1940 by No 2 Infantry Training Group in the Northumbrian Area (later Northumberland County Division) of Home Forces. It was commanded by Brigadier H. Pawle (Brigadier G.F. Gough from 20 May 1941), and comprised four newly raised infantry battalions from Northern England. Home brigades had a purely static coast defence role.

The brigade's units had been dispersed to other brigades (in the Northumberland County Division and outside it) or for conversion to other roles by the time the brigade ceased to function operationally on 1 December. The Brigade HQ was disbanded on 22 December 1941.

== Order of battle ==
The composition of 202nd Brigade was as follows:

- 11th Battalion, King's Regiment (Liverpool) – formed 4 July 1940 at Formby; joined 20 October 1940, left 18 November 1941; converted into 152nd Regiment, Royal Armoured Corps 1 January 1942
- 12th Battalion, King's Regiment (Liverpool) – formed 4 July 1940; joined 20 October 1940; to 225th Independent Infantry Brigade (Home) 27 May 1941; converted later that year into 101st Light Anti-Aircraft Regiment, Royal Artillery
- 11th Battalion, Green Howards – formed 4 July 1940 at Richmond, North Yorkshire; joined 20 October 1940, left 26 November 1941; later to 143rd Infantry Brigade
- 7th Battalion, East Lancashire Regiment – formed as 50th Holding Battalion, East Lancashires May 1940; became 7th Bn July 1940; joined 20 October 1940, left 26 November 1941; converted into 103rd Light Anti-Aircraft Regiment, Royal Artillery 1 December 1941
- 9th (Garrison) Battalion, Green Howards – formed 23 March 1940 at Dover; served in the Shetlands garrison as part of Orkney and Shetland Defence Force (OSDEF); transferred from 216th Independent Infantry Brigade (Home) 14 November 1941; left 30 November and converted into 108th Light Anti-Aircraft Regiment, Royal Artillery 1 January 1942
