= 108th Light Anti-Aircraft Regiment, Royal Artillery =

WWII British Army military unit

9th (Garrison) Battalion, Green Howards 108th Light Anti-Aircraft Regiment, RA
- Cap badge of the Royal Artillery
- Active: 23 March 1940–20 February 1946
- Country: United Kingdom
- Branch: British Army
- Role: Infantry; Air defence
- Size: Battalion; Regiment
- Part of: 52nd (Lowland) Infantry Division
- Engagements: Operation Vitality II; Operation Infatuate; Operation Blackcock; Operation Veritable; Invasion of Germany

The 108th Light Anti-Aircraft Regiment, Royal Artillery, (108th LAA Rgt) was an air defence unit of the British Army during World War II. Initially raised as an infantry battalion of the Green Howards in 1940, it transferred to the Royal Artillery in 1942. It served with 52nd (Lowland) Infantry Division, training for mountain warfare and airlanding operations, but finally went into action at sea level in the Battle of the Scheldt in the autumn of 1944. It fought through the battles in the Rhineland and Germany in 1945 until the end of the war, after which it was disbanded.

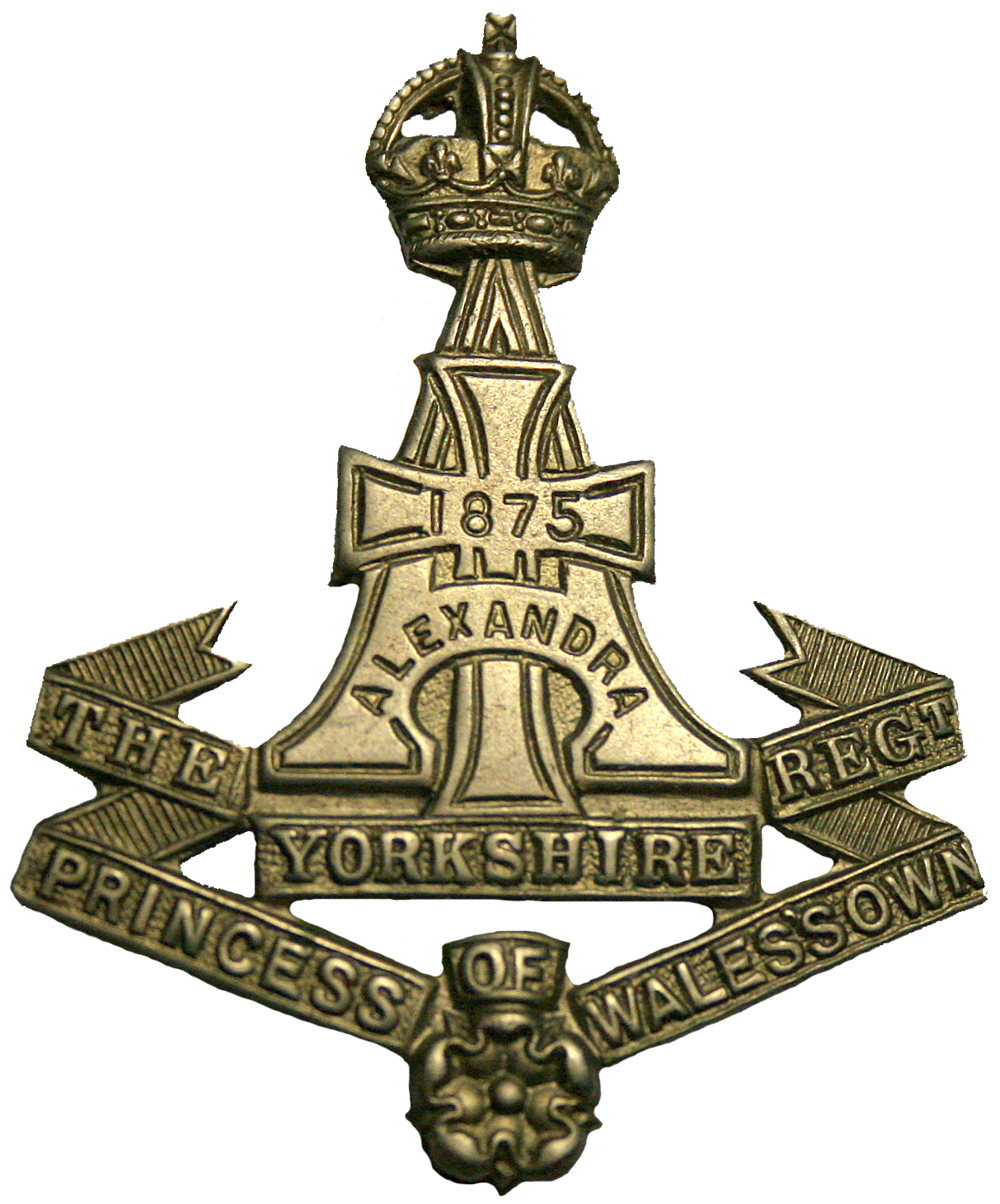
Green Howards' cap badge

== 9th (Garrison) Battalion, Green Howards ==
The 9th (Garrison) Battalion, Green Howards (Alexandra, Princess of Wales's Own Yorkshire Regiment), was formed on 23 March 1940 at Dover as part of the rapid expansion of the Army with wartime conscripts. By 7 April 1941 the battalion had joined the Shetlands garrison in the Orkney and Shetland Defence Force (OSDEF).

On 31 October 1941, it returned to England and joined 216th Independent Infantry Brigade (Home), a static coast defence formation serving in the Northumberland County Division. On 14 November it transferred within the division to 202nd Independent Infantry Brigade (Home). However, the brigade was broken up during December as its units were converted to other roles.

== 108th Light Anti-Aircraft Regiment ==
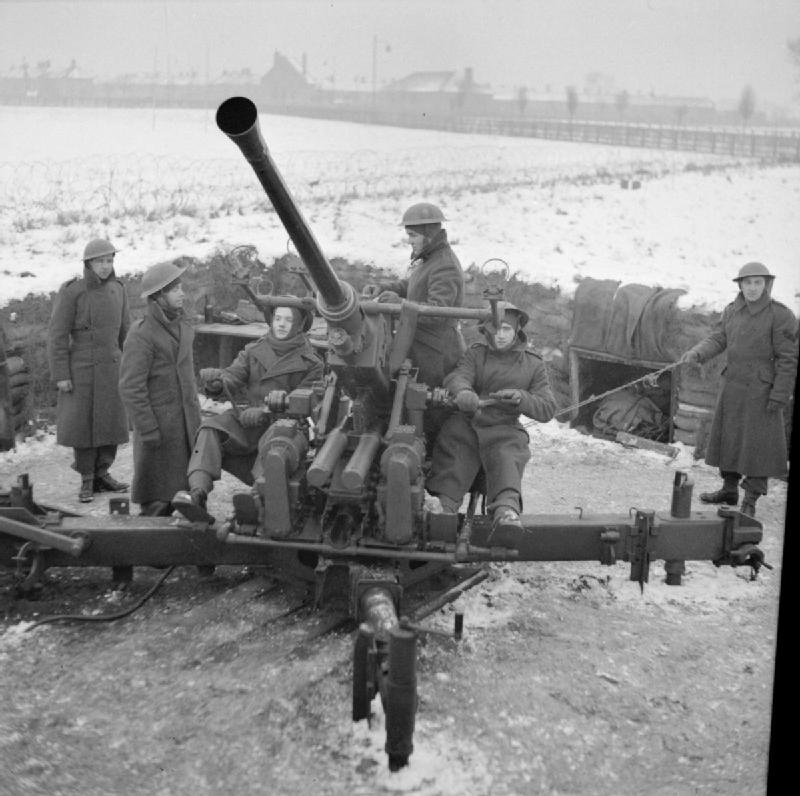
A Bofors 40 mm LAA gun crew under training, January 1942

On 1 January 1942, 9th Green Howards transferred to the Royal Artillery (RA) to begin retraining in the light anti-aircraft (LAA) role as 108th LAA Regiment, consisting of Regimental HQ (RHQ) and 354, 355 and 356 LAA Batteries equipped with the Bofors 40 mm gun. It immediately joined Anti-Aircraft Command, but left in February before it had been assigned to a brigade.

52nd (Lowland) Division's formation sign, adopted while training as a mountain division

=== Training ===
The regiment joined 52nd (Lowland) Infantry Division in Scottish Command on 12 March 1942, and remained with that formation for the rest of its existence. In May 1942 52nd (L) Division began training in mountain warfare in the Grampian Mountains. This training reached high intensity after Major-General Neil Ritchie took command of the division in September, following his return from Eighth Army in the Western Desert. The training culminated in Exercise Goliath II, which lasted for three weeks in October 1943 under harsh conditions. After this training the division was considered by some to be the 'toughest, fittest and hardest in the British Army'.

Although the training was genuine, the division also played a significant role in Allied deception plans, such as Operation Tindall, designed to convince the German high command that a mythical 'Fourth Army' under General Sir Andrew Thorne was gathering in Scotland to invade Occupied Norway. This was developed into Operation Fortitude North to divert German attention away from the genuine Allied plans to invade Normandy (Operation Overlord).

This pretence was kept up for some time after the Normandy invasion began on D Day (6 June 1944). In August 1944 the division was transferred to First Allied Airborne Army and began training in airlanding operations. 157th Brigade Group, including 354 LAA Bty of 108th LAA Rgt, was organised as the seaborne follow-up echelon of the division, and landed in North West Europe on 9 September in readiness for the rest of the division to be used in an airborne operation. A number of such operations were planned and cancelled before Operation Market Garden was given the go-ahead. This was to use three parachute divisions to seize an 'airborne carpet' of bridges ahead of 21st Army Group as far as Arnhem across the Nederrijn. When Market Garden was launched on 17–25 September 1944, 52nd (L) Division was scheduled to be airlifted to Arnhem as soon as 1st Airborne Division had secured landing strips north of the town. However, the failure of Market Garden meant that 52nd (L) Division was never used in this role. Instead, it was sent by sea to reinforce 21st Army Group fighting its way through the Netherlands.

=== Scheldt ===
52nd (L) Division sailed to Ostend between 13 and 20 October, when it was rejoined by 157th Bde Group, which had been operating under 3rd Canadian Division. From 23 October until December, 52nd (L) Division was assigned to First Canadian Army, serving first under II Canadian Corps and then I British Corps. The division's first operation would be the Battle of the Scheldt to help open the vital port of Antwerp – ironically, not in mountainous terrain or deployed by air for which it had trained, but fighting below sea level among the flooded polders around the Scheldt Estuary. The division made an amphibious assault across the West Scheldt to South Beveland in the early hours of 26 October in Operation Vitality II. It then helped the Canadians and Commandos to capture the island of Walcheren in Operation Infatuate, by making an amphibious assault on Flushing on 1 November, followed by an amphibious assault on Middelburg on 6 November, after which the German defenders surrendered.

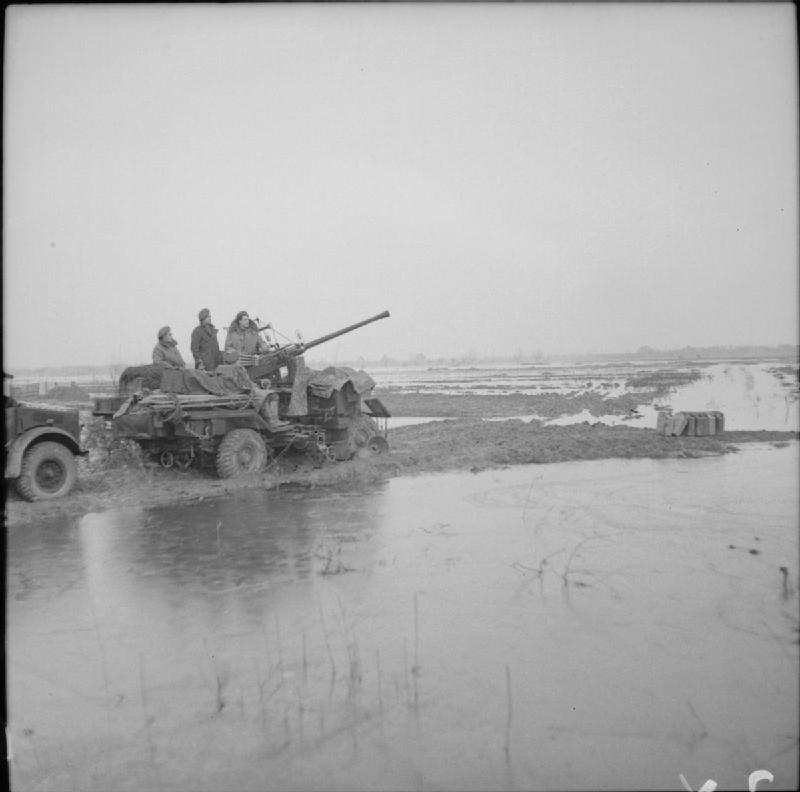
Self-propelled Bofors gun in Holland, December 1944

Since the Allies had achieved air superiority, there was little call for AA defence, and AA units became increasingly used to supplement the divisional artillery to support ground operations. LAA units fired tracer to guide night attacks onto their objectives, and the Bofors guns were much in demand for infantry support. They could give useful close-range fire to help infantry working from cover to cover; the rapid fire was good for suppressing enemy heavy weapons, the 40 mm round's sensitive percussion fuze providing an airburst effect among trees. It was also used for 'bunker-busting', though the lack of protection made the gun detachment vulnerable to return fire. LAA units also provided 'refuge strips' for air observation post aircraft spotting for the field guns: a Bofors Troop deployed with Local Warning radar and ground observers could alert the pilot to the presence of enemy aircraft and provide protection for him. (The guns of 76th AA Brigade on the banks of the Scheldt had also taken part in the massive bombardment for Operation Infatuate.)

On 5 December, the division was transferred to XXX Corps of Second British Army. Most LAA units now saw more action in ground firing roles than for AA defence, but from 17 December the Luftwaffe was more active than for many months. This was in support of the Germans' Ardennes Offensive (the Battle of the Bulge). Bad weather then grounded the Luftwaffe until the battle was almost over, but on 1 January 1945 it launched Operation Bodenplatte against Allied airfields. Aircraft appeared all over 21st Army Group's area, suffering heavy casualties: GHQ AA Troops reported that '40 mm LAA had the time of its life'.

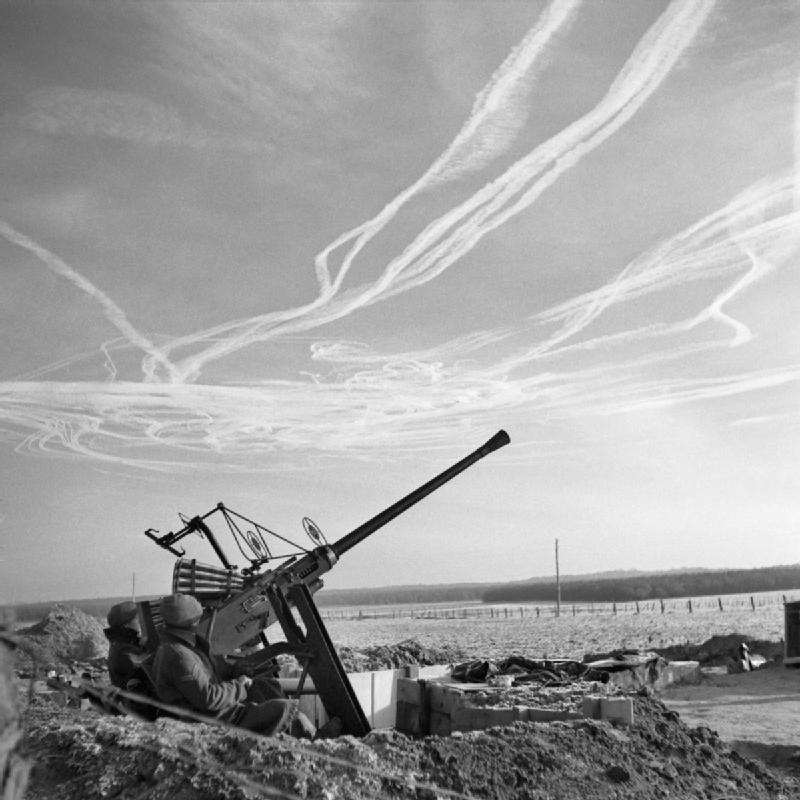
A Bofors crew watches vapour trails above the Dutch–German border on 25 December 1944

=== Rhineland ===
In January 1945, 52nd (L) Division participated in Operation Blackcock, the clearing of the Roer Triangle between the rivers Meuse (Dutch: Maas) and Roer beginning on 18 January. The air and artillery support was massive, including the use of the 'Pepperpot', in which divisional guns and mortars of all calibres including the LAA regiments' Bofors were used to saturate the enemy positions in front of the assaulting infantry. Once the defensive crust had been forced, the weather was as much of a hindrance as the German defenders. Supported by 43rd (Wessex) Division coming into line alongside, 52nd (L) Division took its successive objectives codenamed 'Crown', 'Bear', 'Eagle' and 'Fleece' and the Roer bridgehead was eliminated by 26 January. As a result, the 52nd became the first British formation to be based in a German town.

21st Army Group's next offensive was Operation Veritable to clear the Reichswald between the Maas and the Rhine. XXX Corps launched its attack on 8 February, and as the operation developed, 52nd (L) Division came in on the flank on 15 February. While the field and medium artillery concentrated on the enemy's batteries, command posts and communication centres, the divisional LAA regiments took part in the 'Pepperpots' preceding infantry attacks. By this stage of the war divisional LAA regiments had started receiving quadruple 0.5-inch Browning machine guns on Self-Propelled (SP) mountings (the M51 Quadmount) in place of a proportion of their Bofors guns, to improve their capability against 'snap' attacks by the new German jet fighter-bombers. Under this arrangement a troop comprised four SP or towed Bofors and two quadruple SP Brownings. 52nd (L) Division finished clearing the banks along the Maas from Gennep on 18 February after some bitter fighting for Bleijenbeek Castle. The final part of 'Veritable', Operation Blockbuster, completed the clearance up to the banks of the Rhine. 52nd (L) Division took Afferden after heavy fighting, and then pushed on to link up with US forces by 4 March; it took Haus Loo fort, one of the last German outposts west of the Rhine, on 8 March.

=== Germany ===
Although 52nd (L) Division was holding the Rhine bank, it was designated as a follow-up formation for the crossing (Operation Plunder) and was not involved in the initial assault, 108th LAA Rgt was one of the LAA units moved up close to the west bank where it was dug-in and carefully concealed in the 48 hours before D-Day. Their role was both to provide AA cover during the night and to take part in the initial 'Pepperpot'. 15th (Scottish) Infantry Division, passing through 52nd (L) Division to lead the assault for XII Corps, had over 700 guns of all types on call when the bombardment began at 23.30 on 23 March. This was followed by 'the start of the Divisional "Pepperpot" at 1 A.M. to swell the din in a mad crescendo and to criss-cross the darkness with the vivid red of anti-aircraft and anti-tank and machine-gun tracer'. The infantry set off across the river in amphibious Buffaloes at 02.00 on 24 March, and made rapid progress inland to link up with the airborne troops who landed during the morning (Operation Varsity). The Luftwaffe did virtually nothing during the assaults or during D-Day itself: only after nightfall did Junkers Ju 88s begin scattered divebombing attacks at medium and low level against the British bridging sites, artillery positions and supply routes. Some of these were engaged by searchlights and LAA guns. The number of attacks increased the following night and were maintained on the fourth night, but after that Second Army's exploitation was so deep that the Luftwaffe was forced to switch its attacks away from the Rhine to harassing the leading formations.

52nd (L) Division began crossing on 25 March, its leading units coming under the command of 15th (S) Division as they mopped up the bridgehead and linked up with 6th Airborne Division. Second Army then began a rapid advance across Germany, during which the Luftwaffe attacked bridging sites, artillery positions and road movements. For the divisional LAA guns most of these involved 'snap' actions, against low-flying attackers using cloud cover, and often using jet aircraft. Part of 52nd (L) Division cleaned up pockets of Germans round Ibbenbüren while the rest of the division crossed the Dortmund–Ems Canal.

As Second Army raced forwards, 52nd (L) Division was switched to XXX Corps for the attack on Bremen. Lt-Gen Brian Horrocks, commanding XXX Corps, considered that at this stage of the war, 52nd (L) Division was one of the best in Second Army because it still retained a number of the original personnel (which was a consequence of its late arrival in the theatre). From 20 to 26 April XXX Corps closed in on Bremen against stubborn resistance. The division then had to control rioting and looting in the chaotic city. The numbers of Luftwaffe attacks on the advancing British divisions peaked in the last week before the German surrender at Lüneburg Heath on 4 May.

=== Disbandment ===
After VE Day the units of 21st Army Group were engaged in occupation duties, disarming German troops and administering the British Zone of Allied-occupied Germany. Demobilisation began later in 1945 and 108th LAA Regiment disbanded on 20 February 1946, though the rest of 52nd (L) Division continued doing duty in British Army of the Rhine for some months to come.
