= 103rd Light Anti-Aircraft Regiment, Royal Artillery =

7th Battalion, East Lancashire Regiment 103rd Light Anti-Aircraft Regiment, RA
- Cap badge of the Royal Artillery
- Active: May 1940 – 15 April 1944
- Country: United Kingdom
- Branch: British Army
- Role: Infantry; Air defence
- Size: Battalion; Regiment
- Part of: 55th (West Lancashire) Infantry Division; 61st Infantry Division

The 103rd Light Anti-Aircraft Regiment, Royal Artillery, (103rd LAA Rgt) was an air defence unit of the British Army during World War II. Initially raised as an infantry battalion of the East Lancashire Regiment in 1940, it transferred to the Royal Artillery in 1941. It served in Northern England and Northern Ireland but saw no active service. Shortly before D Day, it was broken up to reinforce other units that fought in the campaign in North West Europe.

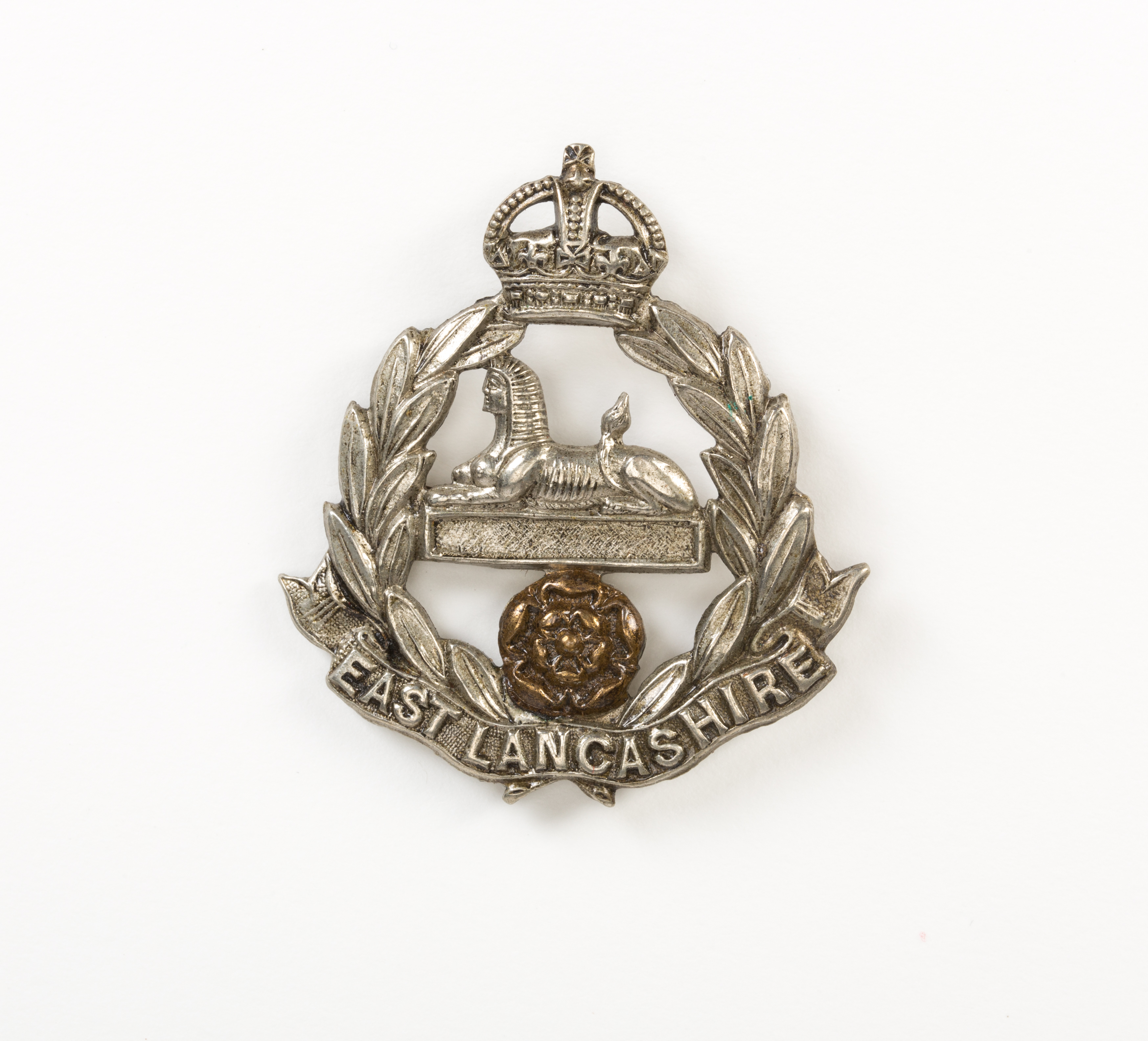
East Lancashire Regiment cap badge.

== 7th Battalion, East Lancashire Regiment ==
The unit was originally formed in May 1940 as 50th Holding Battalion, East Lancashire Regiment, as part of the rapid expansion of the Army with wartime conscripts. It converted to a normal infantry battalion in July that year as 7th Battalion, East Lancashire Regiment. (Note: Another source states that 50th Holding Bn was formed from a company of a Mixed Holding Battalion at Huyton, near Liverpool, to which a draft of veterans from the British Expeditionary Force (BEF) was added after the Fall of France, and that the battalion became the 8th Battalion, East Lancashire Regiment (later 144th Regiment Royal Armoured Corps). The likelihood is that both the 7th and 8th Bns originated from the same pool of men in 50th Holding Bn.)

On 20 October it joined 202nd Independent Infantry Brigade (Home) which was being organised by No 2 Infantry Training Group as a static defence formation in Northumbrian Area. The brigade became part of Northumberland County Division when that formation became operational in X Corps on 24 February 1941.

== 103rd Light Anti-Aircraft Regiment ==
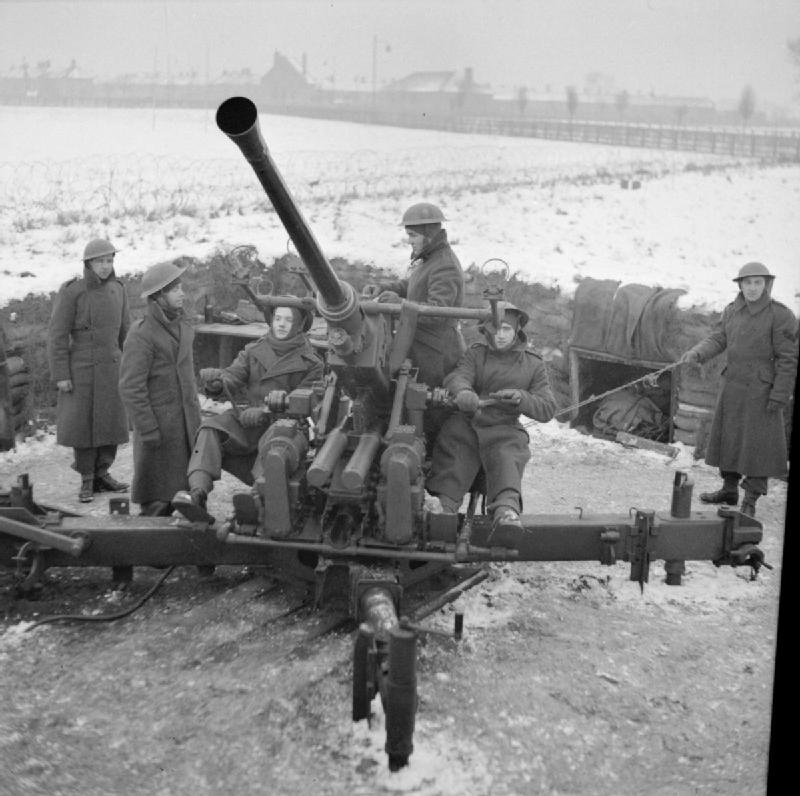
A Bofors 40 mm LAA gun crew under training, January 1942.

7th East Lancashires left 202nd Bde on 18 November 1941 and transferred to the Royal Artillery (RA) to begin retraining in the light anti-aircraft (LAA) role, equipped with Bofors 40 mm guns: on 1 December it became 103rd LAA Regiment with 339–341 LAA Batteries.

55th (West Lancashire) Division's formation sign.

After initial training the regiment joined Anti-Aircraft Command, but left in February 1942 before it had been allocated to a brigade. It was assigned to 55th (West Lancashire) Infantry Division on 4 February 1942. The 55th was a prewar Territorial Army (TA) division that had just been placed of a lower establishment as a home defence and training formation in Northern Command.

103rd LAA Rgt left 55th (West Lancs) Division on 30 November 1942 and joined 61st Infantry Division, a second line TA formation serving in Northern Ireland. The division returned to England in February 1943, serving successively in XI Corps District in Essex (February to May), and then II Corps District in East Anglia.

61st Division's formation sign

In May 1943 the division was assigned to 21st Army Group for the planned Allied invasion of Normandy (Operation Overlord). It was to have had an assault role alongside 15th (Scottish) and 43rd (Wessex) Infantry Divisions. However, although it participated in exercises with the assault forces, it was later relegated to providing reinforcements. The division moved to South-Eastern Command in October 1943, on anti-invasion duty in Kent.

== Disbandment ==
In early 1944 it was decided to increase the war establishment of the LAA regiments of the armoured and infantry divisions assigned to Overlord, particularly to man the multiple-barrelled 20 mm guns (usually Oerlikons or Polstens) that were being added to some regiments. 103rd LAA Regiment was broken up to provide some of the additional personnel. In the first phase, on 23 February, the regiment's Troops were individually numbered:

- A, B and C Trps of 339 LAA Bty became 57, 58 and 59 Trps
- D, E and F Trps of 340 LAA Bty became 60, 70 and 71 Trps
- G, H and I Trps of 341 LAA Bty became 72, 73 and 74 Trps

In the second phase, on 14 March, these Troops were transferred to other regiments:

- 57, 58 and 59 Trps went to 172, 173 and 174 LAA Btys of 58th (Argyll & Sutherland Highlanders) LAA Rgt in 11th Armoured Division
- 60, 70 and 71 Trps went to 390, 391 and 392 LAA Btys of 119th LAA Rgt in 15th (Scottish) Infantry Division, as X, Y and Z 20 mm Trps
- 72, 73 and 74 Trps went to 1, 41 and 42 LAA Btys of 15th (Isle of Man) LAA Rgt in 7th Armoured Division
  All three divisions landed in Normandy and fought through the campaign in North West Europe.

Finally, RHQ and the battery HQs of 214, 235 and 292 LAA Btys began disbanding on 18 March and completed this process by 15 April 1944.
