= Robert Cotton Money =

British Army general (1888–1985)

Major-General Robert Cotton Money CB MC
- Born: 21 July 1888
- Died: 16 April 1985 (aged 96); Hertfordshire, England
- Military career
- Allegiance: United Kingdom
- Branch: British Army
- Service years: 1909–1944
- Rank: Major-General
- Nickname: "Robin"
- Service number: 4397
- Unit: Cameronians (Scottish Rifles)
- Commands: Baluchistan District (1942–1944); South Wales District (1941–1942); Northumberland County Division (1941); 15th (Scottish) Infantry Division (1940–1941); 136th Infantry Brigade (1940); Senior Officers' School, Sheerness (1939−1940); Lucknow Infantry Brigade (1936–1939); 1st Battalion Cameronians (Scottish Rifles) (1931–1934)
- Conflicts: First World War; Second World War
- Awards: Companion of the Order of the Bath; Military Cross; Mentioned in Despatches

Major-General Robert Cotton Money, CB, MC (21 July 1888 – 16 April 1985) was a senior British Army officer, who commanded the 15th (Scottish) Infantry Division during the early part of the Second World War.

== Military career ==
Money was born in 1888, the only child of Robert Cotton Money, an officer in the King's Own Yorkshire Light Infantry. He was educated at Wellington College before entering the Royal Military College, Sandhurst. He passed out of Sandhurst as a second lieutenant and joined the Cameronians (Scottish Rifles), British Army, in March 1909.

At the outbreak of the First World War he was posted to the 1st Battalion, which was sent to France with the British Expeditionary Force (BEF) as rear-area security troops. Money, an amateur photographer, took a number of photographs of the battalion as it deployed and saw combat in 1914 and early 1915, including images of the retreat from Mons, the Battle of Le Cateau, the action at Néry, and the First Battle of the Marne. He was awarded the Military Cross (MC) in February 1915. He later served in India, and, after marrying in 1917, remained in the British Army after the armistice of 11 November 1918.

After attending the Staff College, Camberley from 1922 to 1923, following by serving as adjutant of his battalion, he commanded the 1st Battalion of his regiment from 1931 to 1934. He was promoted to colonel in January 1935, with seniority dated back to October 1934, while serving on half-pay.

He commanded a brigade in the Army of India at Lucknow from 1936 to 1939, from where he was appointed as Commandant of the Senior Officers' School, Sheerness in 1939. Relinquishing this role, from June 1940 until August he commanded the 136th Infantry Brigade, a Territorial Army (TA) unit, part of the 45th Infantry Division. In 1940–41, he commanded the 15th (Scottish) Infantry Division, then the Northumberland County Division from February 1941 until its disbandment in December. He was later appointed to command a district in India, and retired from the army in 1944 to take up a post at the Ministry of Transport. He finally retired from government service in 1952.

== Personal life ==
He married Daphne Gartside Spaight in 1917; the couple had one son, 2nd Lt. Robert Cotton Money (1919–1940), and one daughter, Felicity Daphne Dorina Money (1925–2011). His son was killed in action in 1940 during the Second World War, serving with the 2nd Battalion, Cameronians (Scottish Rifles) in the Battle of France.

Following his retirement they eventually settled in the village of Cholesbury, Buckinghamshire where they continued to live for the rest of their lives. Daphne died in 1968, and Money remarried in 1978 - at the age of ninety to Evelyn Grosstephan (1913–2008).

== Bibliography ==
- "MONEY, Maj.-Gen. Robert Cotton ", in Who Was Who (Online ed.). A & C Black. 2007.
- Obituary in The Times, 29 April 1985, p. 14.
- Smart, Nick (2005). Biographical Dictionary of British Generals of the Second World War. Barnsley, U.K.: Pen & Sword Military. ISBN 1-84415-049-6.

Military offices
Preceded by Roderic Petre	Commandant of the Senior Officers' School, Sheerness; 1939−1940	Succeeded by William Robb
Preceded by Roland Le Fanu	GOC 15th (Scottish) Infantry Division; 1940–1941	Succeeded by Sir Oliver Leese
