= 216th Brigade (United Kingdom) =

216th Brigade 216th Independent Infantry Brigade (Home)
- Active: 1916–8 April 1918; 17 October 1940-13 December 1941
- Country: United Kingdom
- Branch: British Army
- Type: Infantry Brigade
- Role: Training and Home Defence

Commanders
- Notable commanders: Terence Battersby

The 216th Brigade was a Home Service formation of the British Army during the First and the Second World Wars.

== First World War ==
216 Bde was raised in late 1916 as part of 72nd Division, which had the dual role of training men for overseas drafts and providing forces for home defence.

On 21 December 1917 orders were issued to break up 72nd Division. Disbandment began in January 1918 and its last elements disappeared on 8 April 1918.

=== Order of Battle ===
The following infantry battalions served in the brigade:

- 10th Battalion, Somerset Light Infantry (left by July 1917)
- 14th Battalion, Yorkshire Light Infantry (disbanded 8 April 1918)
- 83rd Provisional Battalion, became 10th Battalion, Oxfordshire and Buckinghamshire Light Infantry on 27 October 1917
- 261st Graduated Battalion, (joined by 23 July 1917, became 52nd (Graduated) Battalion, Leicestershire Regiment on 27 October 1917)
- 262nd Graduated Battalion, (joined by 9 July 1917, became 51st (Graduated) Battalion, Royal Warwickshire Regiment on 27 October 1917)

== Second World War ==
=== Formation and Service ===
A new brigade under the title of the 216th Independent Infantry Brigade (Home) was formed for service in the United Kingdom on 17 October 1940 under the Aberdeen Area headquarters. It was composed of Scottish infantry battalions, which assembled on 2 December 1940. The Brigade transferred from the Aberdeen Area to the Northumbrian Area on 25 February 1941, and then became part of the Northumberland County Division when that formation was created on 12 March 1941. The Divisional headquarters began to disband on 1 December 1941, and the brigade HQ disbanded on 13 December, all its battalions having been previously posted away.

=== Composition ===
The following units served in the brigade:

- 12th Battalion, Royal Scots (2 December 1940 — 21 October 1941)
- 13th Battalion, Highland Light Infantry (2 December 1940 — 17 November 1941)
- 11th Battalion, Gordon Highlanders (2 December 1940 — 6 October 1941)
- 15th Battalion, Argyll and Sutherland Highlanders (2 December 1940 — 24 February 1941)
- 9th (Donside) Battalion, Gordon Highlanders (11 October–15 November 1941 – converted the next year into the 116th Regiment Royal Armoured Corps)
- 7th Battalion, Seaforth Highlanders (11 – 31 October 1941)
- 9th (Garrison) Battalion, Green Howards (31 October – 14 November 1941 – converted the next year into 108th Light Anti-Aircraft Regiment, Royal Artillery)

=== Commanders ===
The following officers commanded 216 Bde:

- Brig T.E.M. Battersby (from 1 November 1940)
- Brig W. Carden Roe (from 1 July 1941)
- Lt-Col H. Ross-Skinner (acting from 29 October 1941)
