= Val de Drôme =

- Commune
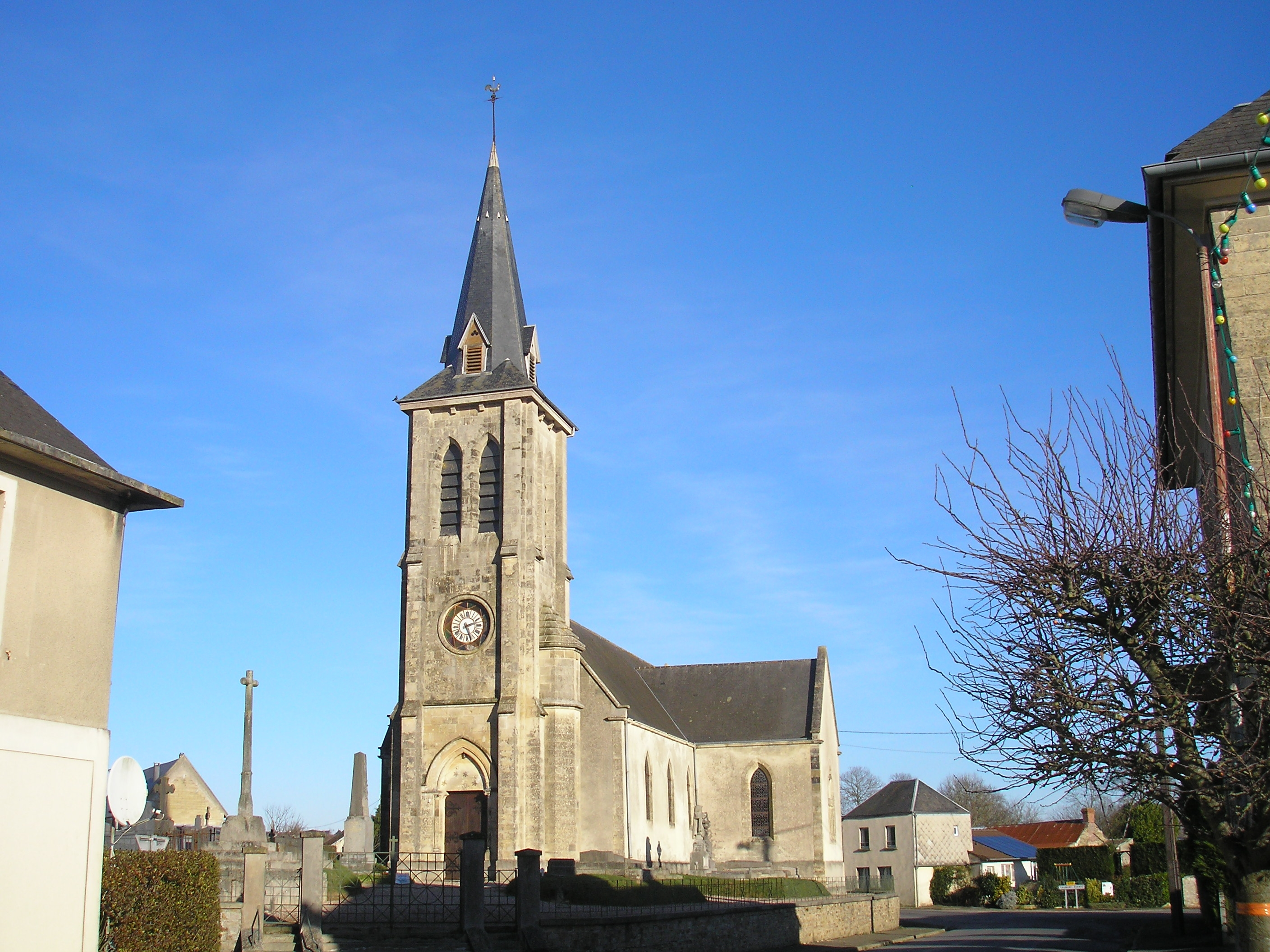
- The church in Sept-Vents
- Location of Val de Drôme
- Location within France Location within Normandy
- Coordinates: 49°04′34″N 0°49′12″W
- Country: France
- Region: Normandy
- Department: Calvados
- Arrondissement: Vire
- Canton: Les Monts d'Aunay
- Intercommunality: Pré-Bocage Intercom

Government
  - Mayor (2020–2026): Michel Leforestier
- Area^{1}: 27.62 km^{2} (10.66 sq mi)
- Population (2023): 899
  - Density: 32.5/km^{2} (84.3/sq mi)
- Time zone: UTC+01:00 (CET)
  - Summer (DST): UTC+02:00 (CEST)
- INSEE/Postal code: 14672 /14240
- ^{1} French Land Register data, which excludes lakes, ponds, glaciers > 1 km^{2} (0.386 sq mi or 247 acres) and river estuaries.

Val de Drôme (French pronunciation: [val də dʁom], literally Vale of Drôme) is a commune in the department of Calvados, northwestern France. The municipality was established on 1 January 2017 by merger of the former communes of Sept-Vents (the seat), Dampierre, La Lande-sur-Drôme and Saint-Jean-des-Essartiers.

== See also ==
- Communes of the Calvados department
