= La Lande-sur-Drôme =

- Part of Val de Drôme
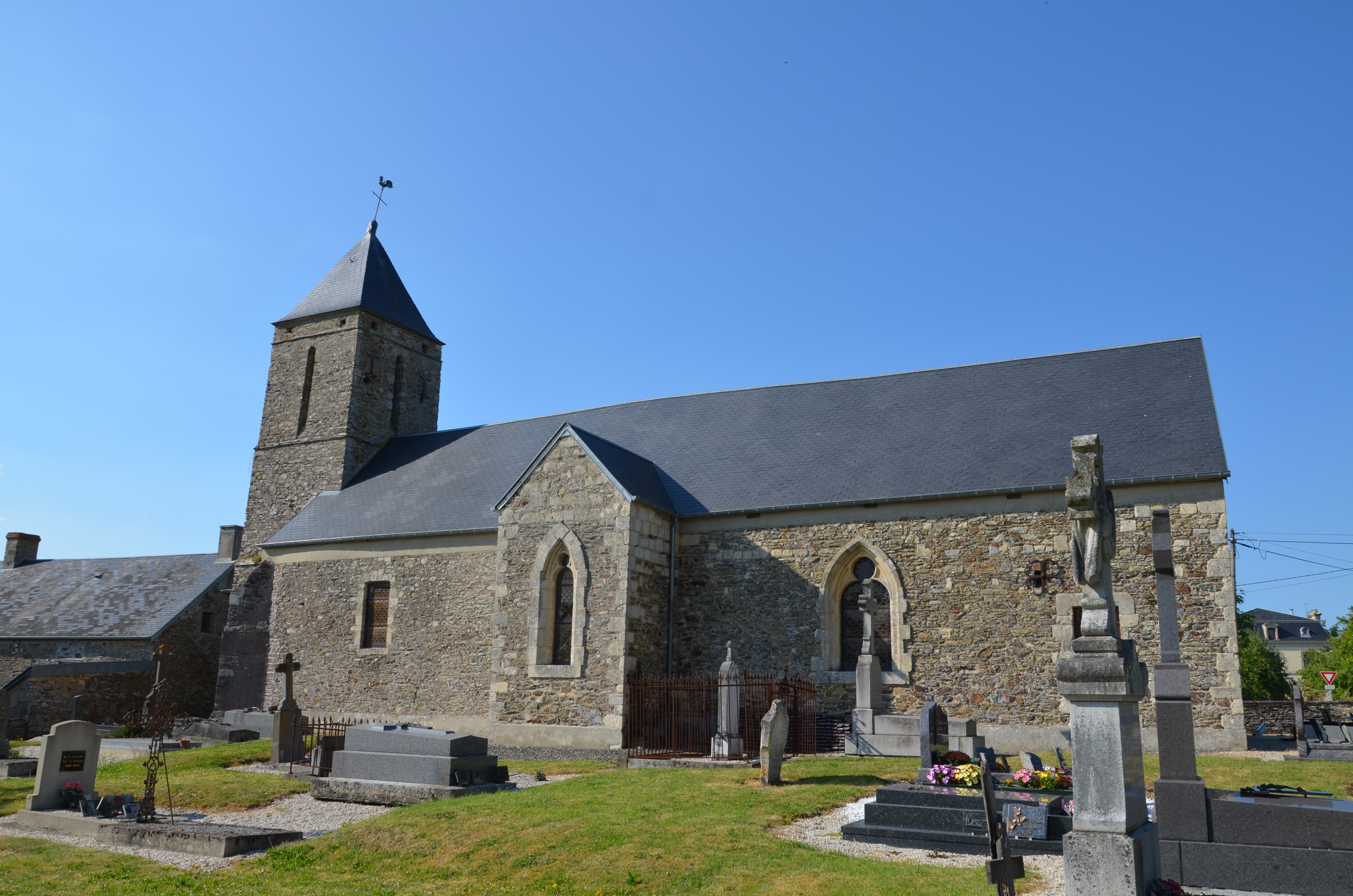
- Location of La Lande-sur-Drôme
- Location within France Location within Normandy
- Coordinates: 49°04′12″N 0°52′04″W
- Country: France
- Region: Normandy
- Department: Calvados
- Arrondissement: Vire
- Canton: Les Monts d'Aunay
- Commune: Val de Drôme
- Area^{1}: 1.57 km^{2} (0.61 sq mi)
- Elevation: 110 m (360 ft)
- Highest elevation: 132 m (433 ft)
- Lowest elevation: 89 m (292 ft)
- Population (2023): 69
  - Density: 44/km^{2} (110/sq mi)
- Time zone: UTC+01:00 (CET)
  - Summer (DST): UTC+02:00 (CEST)
- Postal code: 14240
- ^{1} French Land Register data, which excludes lakes, ponds, glaciers > 1 km^{2} (0.386 sq mi or 247 acres) and river estuaries.

La Lande-sur-Drôme (French pronunciation: [la lɑ̃d syʁ dʁom], literally La Lande on Drôme) is a former commune in the Calvados department in the Normandy region in northwestern France. On 1 January 2017, it was merged into the new commune Val de Drôme.

== See also ==
- Communes of the Calvados department
