= Dampierre, Calvados =

Dampierre
- Part of Val de Drôme
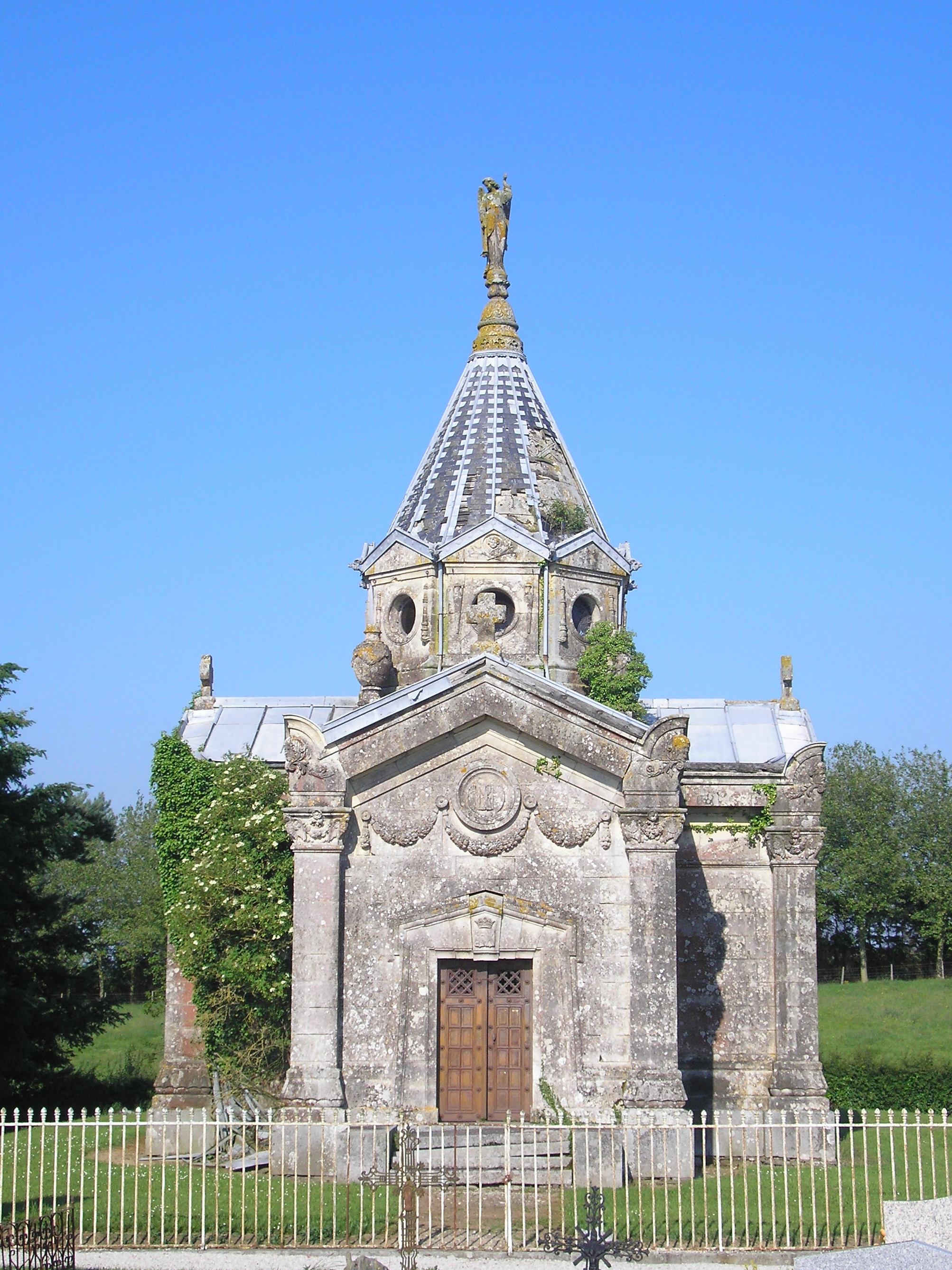
- Funeral chapel
- Location of Dampierre
- Location within France Location within Normandy
- Coordinates: 49°02′38″N 0°52′05″W
- Country: France
- Region: Normandy
- Department: Calvados
- Arrondissement: Vire
- Canton: Les Monts d'Aunay
- Commune: Val de Drôme
- Area^{1}: 5.26 km^{2} (2.03 sq mi)
- Elevation: 182 m (597 ft)
- Highest elevation: 181 m (594 ft)
- Lowest elevation: 97 m (318 ft)
- Population (2023): 156
  - Density: 29.7/km^{2} (76.8/sq mi)
- Time zone: UTC+01:00 (CET)
  - Summer (DST): UTC+02:00 (CEST)
- Postal code: 14350
- ^{1} French Land Register data, which excludes lakes, ponds, glaciers > 1 km^{2} (0.386 sq mi or 247 acres) and river estuaries.

Dampierre (French pronunciation: [dɑ̃pjɛʁ]) is a former commune in the Calvados department in the Normandy region in northwestern France. On 1 January 2017, it was merged into the new commune Val de Drôme.

== See also ==
- Communes of the Calvados department
