= Roland Le Fanu =

British Army officer (1888–1957)

Major-General Roland Le Fanu DSO MC
- Born: 13 May 1888
- Died: 2 January 1957 (aged 68)
- Military career
- Allegiance: United Kingdom
- Branch: Royal Navy; British Army
- Service years: 1908–1940
- Rank: Major-General
- Units: Royal Irish Fusiliers; Leicestershire Regiment
- Commands: 15th (Scottish) Infantry Division
- Conflicts: First World War; Waziristan campaign Second World War
- Awards: Distinguished Service Order; Military Cross

Major-General Roland Le Fanu, DSO, MC (13 May 1888 – 2 January 1957) was a senior British Army officer.

== Military career ==
Le Fanu, after being educated in Germany and briefly serving in the Royal Navy, and later transferring to the Royal Irish Fusiliers of the British Army, was commissioned into the Leicestershire Regiment in 1908. Like many of his contemporaries, he saw service during the First World War, for which he was awarded both the Military Cross and the Distinguished Service Order.

After attending the Staff College, Camberley from 1925 to 1926, alongside Walter Oxley, Raymond Briggs, Francis Tuker, Frank Messervy, Ronald Scobie, John Swayne and the Australian Sydney Rowell, who were among his classmates, he became a staff officer at the War Office in March 1931, and from 1931 to 1932 attended the Royal Naval College, Greenwich. He was then deployed to the Rawalpindi District in India in December 1935. He was appointed a companion of the Distinguished Service Order for his service during the Waziristan campaign. He went on to receive a promotion to major general on 29 August 1939, with seniority backdated to 19 July 1938, and soon became general officer commanding 15th (Scottish) Infantry Division in August 1939 at the start of the Second World War before retiring in October 1940.

His son, Sir Victor de Fanu, served as Serjeant at Arms of the House of Commons in the 1980s.

== Bibliography ==
- Smart, Nick (2005). Biographical Dictionary of British Generals of the Second World War. Barnesley: Pen & Sword. ISBN 1844150496.

Military offices
New command	GOC 15th (Scottish) Infantry Division; 1939–1940	Succeeded by Robert Cotton Money
