= 136th (2/1st Devon and Cornwall) Brigade =

2nd/1st Devon and Cornwall Brigade 136th (2/1st Devon and Cornwall) Brigade 136th Infantry Brigade
- Active: October 1914 – 1919; April 1939 – August 1944; February 1945 – March 1946
- Country: United Kingdom
- Branch: Territorial Force; Territorial Army
- Type: Infantry
- Size: Brigade
- Part of: 45th (2nd Wessex) Division; 45th Infantry Division
- Service: First World War; Second World War

The 136th Infantry Brigade was an infantry brigade of the Territorial Force, part of the British Army. It was formed in the First World War as a duplicate of the Devon and Cornwall Brigade and was originally formed as the 2nd/1st Devon and Cornwall Brigade in 1914–1915 before later being renamed as the 136th (2/1st Devon and Cornwall) Brigade. It was sent overseas to India in December 1914 to relieve Regular Army units for service in France. The brigade remained there for the rest of the war, supplying drafts of replacements to the British units fighting in the Middle East and later complete battalions.

It was reformed as 136th Infantry Brigade in the Territorial Army in 1939, again as a duplicate formation, when another European conflict with Germany seemed inevitable. During the Second World War, the brigade was active in the United Kingdom throughout its service. It was disbanded on 31 August 1944.

The brigade was reformed on 1 February 1945 for the reception of troops returning from overseas. It did not see service outside the United Kingdom during the war.

== History ==
=== First World War ===
In accordance with the Territorial and Reserve Forces Act 1907 (7 Edw. 7, c.9) which brought the Territorial Force into being, the TF was intended to be a home defence force for service during wartime and members could not be compelled to serve outside the country. However, on the outbreak of war on 4 August 1914, many members volunteered for Imperial Service. Therefore, TF units were split into 1st Line (liable for overseas service) and 2nd Line (home service for those unable or unwilling to serve overseas) units. 2nd Line units performed the home defence role, although in fact most of these were also posted abroad in due course.

On 15 August 1915, TF units were instructed to separate home service men from those who had volunteered for overseas service (1st Line), with the home service personnel to be formed into reserve units (2nd Line). On 31 August, 2nd Line units were authorized for each 1st Line unit where more than 60% of men had volunteered for overseas service. After being organized, armed and clothed, the 2nd Line units were gradually grouped into large formations thereby forming the 2nd Line brigades and divisions. These 2nd Line units and formations had the same name and structure as their 1st Line parents. On 24 November, it was decided to replace imperial service (1st Line) formations as they proceeded overseas with their reserve (2nd Line) formations. A second reserve (3rd Line) unit was then formed at the peace headquarters of the 1st Line.

The brigade was formed as a 2nd Line duplicate of the Devon and Cornwall Brigade in October 1914, shortly after the outbreak of war. (Note: The peacetime Devon and Cornwall Brigade commanded the 4th and 5th Devons and 4th and 5th DCLI. On mobilization, the 5th DCLI posted their foreign service volunteers to the 4th Battalion to bring it up to strength. As the battalion was now understrength, it was replaced in the brigade by the 6th Devons. The 2nd Line brigade duplicated this altered structure.) It was assigned to the 2nd Wessex Division, the 2nd Line duplicate of the Wessex Division. The division was selected for service in India thereby releasing British and Indian regular battalions for service in Europe. On 12 December, the brigade embarked at Southampton with three battalions; the 2/4th DCLI landed at Karachi on 9 January 1915 and the rest of the brigade at Bombay between 4 and 8 January.

The brigade was effectively broken up on arrival in India; the units reverted to peacetime conditions and the battalions were dispersed to Wellington, Bombay, and Karachi. The Territorial Force divisions and brigades were numbered in May 1915 in the order that they departed for overseas service, starting with the 42nd (East Lancashire) Division. The 2nd Wessex Division should have been numbered as the 45th (2nd Wessex) Division, but as the division had already been broken up, this was merely a place holder. Likewise, the 2nd/1st Devon and Cornwall Brigade was notionally numbered as 136th (2/1st Devon and Cornwall) Brigade.

The units pushed on with training to prepare for active service, handicapped by the need to provide experienced manpower for active service units. By early 1916 it had become obvious that it would not be possible to transfer the division and brigade to the Western Front as originally intended. Nevertheless, individual units proceeded overseas on active service through the rest of the war. The 2/4th Devons served in the Sinai and Palestine Campaign from October 1917 and the 2/6th Devons in the Mesopotamian Campaign from September 1917, so that by the end of the war just the 2/4th DCLI remained in India.

==== First World War units ====
The brigade commanded the following units:

- 2/4th Battalion, Devonshire Regiment, was formed at Exeter on 16 September 1914 and went to India with the brigade, arriving at Bombay between 4 and 8 January 1915. It served with the Southern Brigade, 9th (Secunderabad) Division from January 1915 to October 1917. On 15 October 1917 it sailed from Bombay, arriving at Suez on 25 October. Initially it was on Lines of Communication duties but it joined 234th Brigade, 75th Division near Deir el Balah on 13 December. It left the division in July 1918 and was disbanded on 17 August 1918.
- 2/5th (Prince of Wales's) Battalion, Devonshire Regiment, was formed at Plymouth on 16 September 1914. It did not go to India with the brigade. In September 1915 it transferred to Egypt and in June 1916 it was disbanded with personnel to 1/4th, 1/5th, and 1/6th Devons.
- 2/6th Battalion, Devonshire Regiment, was formed at Barnstaple on 16 September 1914. It went to India with the brigade arriving at Bombay between 4 and 8 January. It served with the Bombay Brigade, 6th Poona Divisional Area (to March 1916), was at Muttra in the 7th Meerut Divisional Area (March to August 1916), and 1st (Peshawar) Brigade, 1st (Peshawar) Division (August 1816 to July 1917). On 14 September 1917, it landed at Basra and was employed on Lines of Communication duties in Mesopotamia for the rest of the war. By the Armistice of Mudros on 31 October 1918, it was at Amara.
- 2/4th Battalion, Duke of Cornwall's Light Infantry was formed at Truro in September 1914. It went to India with the brigade arriving at Karachi on 9 January 1915 and remained in India throughout the war. It served with the Karachi (January to April 1915) and 1st Quetta Brigades (May to October 1915) of 4th (Quetta) Division, at Multan (October 1915 to March 1916) and with the 44th (Ferozepore) Brigade (March 1916 to February 1917) in the 3rd Lahore Divisional Area, and with the Bareilly (March to October 1917), Dehra Dun (October 1917 to March 1918) and Delhi Brigades of 7th Meerut Divisional Area.

=== Second World War ===
By 1939 it became clear that a new European war was likely to break out and, as a direct result of the German invasion of Czechoslovakia on 15 March, the doubling of the Territorial Army was authorised, with each unit and formation forming a duplicate. Consequently, 136th Infantry Brigade was formed in April 1939 as part of the 45th Infantry Division, duplicate of the 43rd (Wessex) Infantry Division. Unusually, it was not a mirror of its parent, the 43rd and 45th Divisions being organized on a geographical basis. (Note: Units from Cornwall, Devon and south Somerset (both the original units and their duplicates) joined the new 45th Infantry Division, whereas those from north Somerset, Dorset, Hampshire and Wiltshire remained with the 43rd (Wessex) Infantry Division.) Initially, the brigade was administered by the 43rd Division until the 45th Division began to function from 7 September 1939.

The brigade remained in the United Kingdom with the 45th Division during the Second World War and did not see active service overseas. In August 1944, the brigade started to disperse as its component units were posted away, a process that was completed on 31 August and the brigade disbanded.

A new brigade headquarters was formed on 1 February 1945 for the reception, selection and training of troops from overseas who were temporarily unfit due to wounds and other causes. The units of the brigade were Reception Camps, Selection Battalions and Training Battalions. It served with the 45th (Holding) Division for the rest of the war.

==== Second World War units ====
The brigade commanded the following units:

- 9th Battalion, Devonshire Regiment – until 17 November 1940
- 4th Battalion, Duke of Cornwall's Light Infantry – until 1 August 1944
- 5th Battalion, Duke of Cornwall's Light Infantry – until 6 September 1942
- 136th Infantry Brigade Anti-Tank Company – formed 19 June 1940, disbanded 21 January 1941 (Note: 45th Reconnaissance Battalion was formed in January 1941 from the 134th, 135th and 136th Infantry Brigade Anti-Tank Companies. It later formed 45 and 54 Columns of the Chindits.)
- 1st Battalion, Royal Irish Fusiliers – from 17 November 1940 until 4 December 1941
- 13th Battalion, Sherwood Foresters – from 12 December 1941 until 10 February 1942
- 2nd Battalion, King's Shropshire Light Infantry – from 23 May 1942 until 19 August 1942
- 7th Battalion, Queen's Own Royal West Kent Regiment – from 21 August 1942 until 4 January 1943
- 12th Battalion, Hampshire Regiment – from 6 September 1942 until 1 August 1944
- 10th Battalion, East Surrey Regiment – from 5 January 1943 until 1 August 1944

== Commanders ==
=== During the First World War ===
The brigade was commanded from formation until embarkation for India by Br.-Gen. Lord St. Levan.

=== During the Second World War ===
The brigade had the following commanders in the Second World War:

From	Rank	Name	Notes
3 September 1939	Brig	C.H. Gotto	from the outbreak of the war
18 June 1940	Brig	R.C. Money	
23 August 1940	Lt-Col	D.A. Bullock	acting
27 August 1940	Brig	G.H.P. Whitfield	
19 August 1943	Brig	C.H.V. Cox	
11 December 1943	Brig	N. MacLeod	
29 July 1944	Lt-Col	T.V. Williams	acting; until 31 August 1944
14 February 1945	Brig	G.E. Younghusband	reformed brigade

== See also ==
- 130th (Devon and Cornwall) Brigade for the 1st Line formation
- British infantry brigades of the First World War
- British brigades of the Second World War

== Bibliography ==
- Becke, Archibald F. (1936). Order of Battle of Divisions Part 2A. The Territorial Force Mounted Divisions and the 1st-Line Territorial Force Divisions (42–56). London: HMSO. OCLC 4405016.
- Becke, Archibald F. (1937). Order of Battle of Divisions Part 2B. The 2nd-Line Territorial Force Divisions (57th–69th) with The Home-Service Divisions (71st–73rd) and 74th and 75th Divisions. London: HMSO. OCLC 4405016.
- Bellis, Malcolm A. (1994). Regiments of the British Army 1939–1945 (Armour & Infantry). London: Military Press International. ISBN 0-85420-999-9.
- James, E.A. (1978). British Regiments 1914–18. London: Samson Books Limited. ISBN 0-906304-03-2.
- Joslen, H. F. (2003) [1960]. Orders of Battle: Second World War, 1939–1945. Uckfield, East Sussex: Naval and Military Press. ISBN 978-1-84342-474-1.
- Perry, F.W. (1993). Order of Battle of Divisions Part 5B. Indian Army Divisions. Newport: Ray Westlake Military Books. ISBN 1-871167-23-X.
- Rinaldi, Richard A (2008). Order of Battle of the British Army 1914. Ravi Rikhye. ISBN 978-0-97760728-0.
- Westlake, Ray (1986). The Territorial Battalions, A Pictorial History, 1859–1985. Tunbridge Wells: Spellmount.
