= Saint-Jean-des-Essartiers =

- Part of Val de Drôme
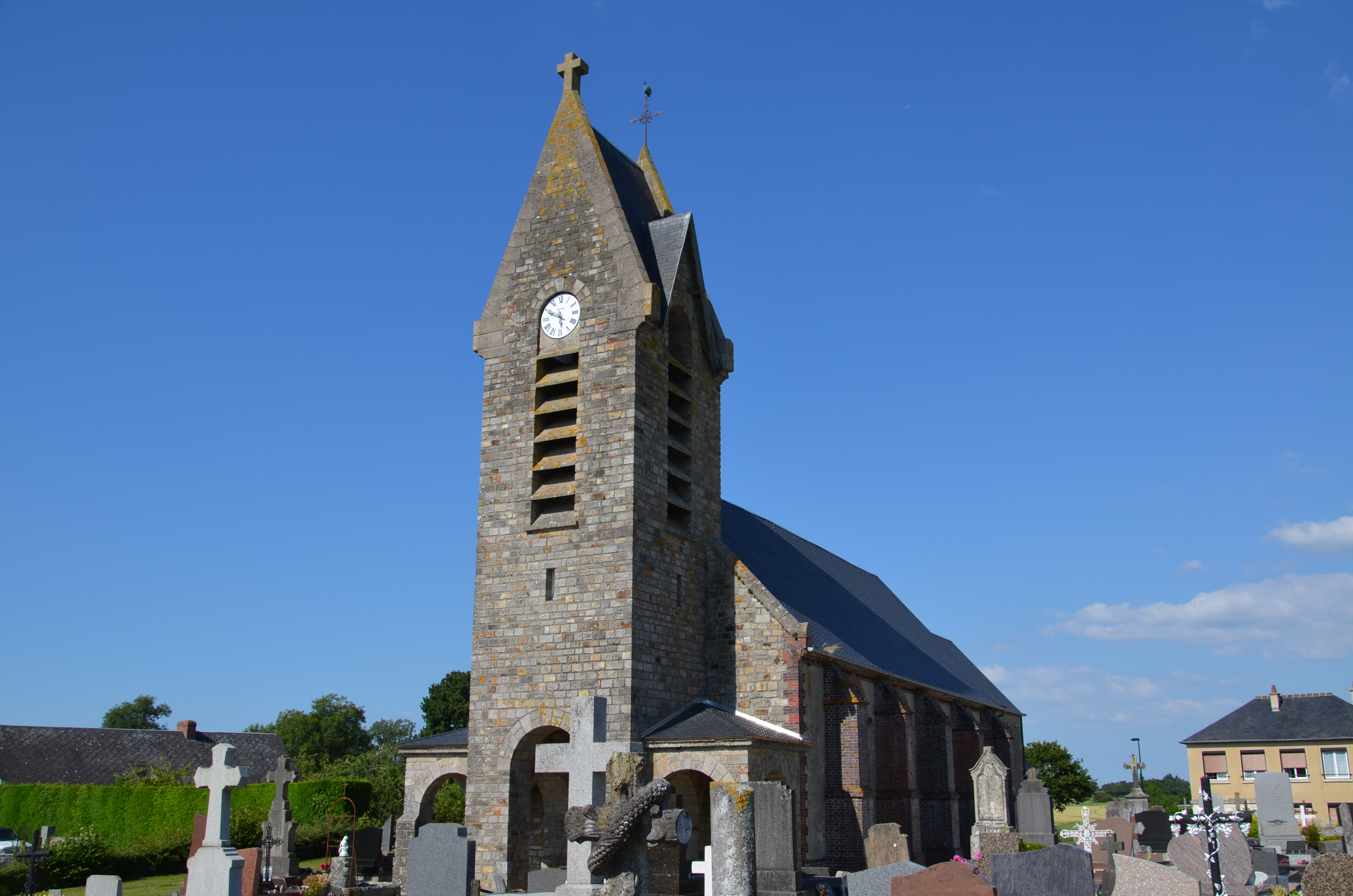
- Location of Saint-Jean-des-Essartiers
- Location within France Location within Normandy
- Coordinates: 49°02′44″N 0°50′11″W
- Country: France
- Region: Normandy
- Department: Calvados
- Arrondissement: Vire
- Canton: Les Monts d'Aunay
- Commune: Val de Drôme
- Area^{1}: 8.27 km^{2} (3.19 sq mi)
- Elevation: 150 m (490 ft)
- Highest elevation: 202 m (663 ft)
- Lowest elevation: 109 m (358 ft)
- Population (2023): 237
  - Density: 28.7/km^{2} (74.2/sq mi)
- Time zone: UTC+01:00 (CET)
  - Summer (DST): UTC+02:00 (CEST)
- Postal code: 14350
- ^{1} French Land Register data, which excludes lakes, ponds, glaciers > 1 km^{2} (0.386 sq mi or 247 acres) and river estuaries.

Saint-Jean-des-Essartiers (French pronunciation: [sɛ̃ ʒɑ̃ de.z‿ɛsaʁtje]) is a former commune in the Calvados department in the Normandy region in northwestern France. On 1 January 2017, it was merged into the new commune Val de Drôme.

== See also ==
- Communes of the Calvados department
