= Terence Battersby =

English cricketer and British Army officer (1893–1972)

Personal information
- Full name: Terence Esmond Maxwell Battersby
- Born: 29 October 1893; Meerut, United Provinces of Agra and Oudh, British India
- Died: 10 January 1972 (aged 78); Goring Heath, Berkshire, England
- Batting: Left-handed

Domestic team information
- Years: Team
- 1930–1932: Devon
- 1926: Army
- 1923/24: Europeans (India)
- 1913: Suffolk

Career statistics
Competition	First-class
Matches	3
Runs scored	110
Batting average	18.33
100s/50s	–/–
Top score	41
Balls bowled	336
Wickets	2
Bowling average	63.00
5 wickets in innings	–
10 wickets in match	–
Best bowling	2/60
Catches/stumpings	1/–
- Source: Cricinfo, 18 April 2011

Brigadier Terence Esmond Maxwell Battersby (29 October 1893 – 10 January 1972) was an English cricketer and British Army officer. Battersby was a left-handed batsman. He was born in Meerut, then in the British Raj, before moving back to England where he was educated at Marlborough College. There he played for the college cricket team.

Battersby represented Suffolk in the 1913 Minor Counties Championship, playing a single match against Lincolnshire. Battersby was mentioned in the London Gazette in February 1914 as having graduated from the Royal Military College with the rank of 2nd Lieutenant. After graduating he joined the Prince of Wales's Leinster Regiment who he served in the First World War within the regiments 1st Battalion. He was once again mentioned in a supplement to the Gazette in 1920, detailing his special appointment to Staff Captain while still serving in the Prince of Wales's Leinster Regiment.

A decade later he made his first-class debut for the Europeans (India) against the Parsees, before playing a further first-class match in that 1923–24 season against the Hindus. Returning to England once more, he played a further first-class match in 1926 for the Army against Oxford University. In his three first-class appearances he scored 110 runs at a batting average of 18.33, with a high score of 41. With the ball he took 2 wickets at a bowling average of 63.00.

He later played Minor Counties Championship cricket for Devon, making his debut for the county in the 1930 Minor Counties Championship against Dorset. He continued to play Minor counties cricket for Devon until the following season. Battersby was in Devon as the Commanding Officer of the 2nd Battalion of The Devonshire Regiment. By 1940, Battersby was a Colonel in charge of the Infantry Record and Pay Office in Exeter. Later in 1940, he was promoted to Acting Brigadier and in November 1940 he was placed as the commanding officer of the 216th Independent Infantry Brigade (Home), a Home Defence brigade which formed part of the Northumberland County Division. He held the position until 1 July 1941. In 1943 he was promoted to Honorary Brigadier on the date of his retirement. For the next ten years he was part of the Regular Army Reserve of Officers, until in 1953 his age meant he could no longer be a reserve officer.

Battersby died on 10 January 1972 in Goring Heath, Berkshire.
