= 225th Brigade (United Kingdom) =

225th Brigade 225th Independent Infantry Brigade (Home)
- Active: May 1915–1919; 14 November 1940 – 30 November 1941
- Country: United Kingdom
- Branch: British Army
- Type: Infantry
- Role: Training and Home Defence
- Size: Brigade
- Engagements: First World War; Second World War

The 225th Brigade was a Home Defence formation of the British Army in the First and the Second World Wars. It existed under several variations of the 225th Brigade title.

== World War I ==
On the outbreak of World War I, the Territorial Force (TF) immediately mobilised for home defence, but shortly afterwards (31 August 1914), its units were authorised to raise 2nd battalions formed from those men who had not volunteered for, or were not fit for, overseas service, together with new volunteers, while the 1st Line went overseas to supplement the Regulars. Early in 1915 the 2nd Line TF battalions were raised to full strength to form new divisions, and began to form Reserve (3rd Line) units to supply drafts. The remaining Home Service men were separated out in May 1915 to form brigades of Coast Defence Battalions (termed Provisional Battalions from June 1915).

=== 5th Provisional Brigade ===
5th Provisional Brigade was formed mainly from details of regiments from East and South-East England, with the following composition:

- 5th Provisional Yeomanry Squadron from details of 1st and 2nd South Midland Mounted Brigades and Shropshire Yeomanry
- 5th Provisional Battery Royal Field Artillery
- 5th Provisional Brigade Ammunition Column RFA
- 5th Provisional Field Company Royal Engineers
- 3/6th (Cyclist) Battalion Norfolk Regiment disbanded March 1916
- 63rd Provisional Battalion from Home Service details of the Middlesex Brigade (7th, 8th, 9th and 10th Bns, Middlesex Regiment)
- 65th Provisional Battalion from Home Service details of 4th Bn Essex Regiment
- 68th Provisional Battalion from Home Service details of 5th Bn, Bedfordshire Regiment and 1st Bn, Hertfordshire Regiment
- 69th Provisional Battalion (The Queen's). This battalion was formed on 19 June 1915 at Tunbridge Wells by amalgamating the Home Service men of the 3/4th and 2/5th Battalions of the Queen's (Royal West Surrey) Regiment. After working on coast defences the battalion moved to Lowestoft in July to join 5th Provisional Brigade. On 5 June 1916 it absorbed 71st Provisional Bn, which comprised the Home Service details of 4th and 5th Bns, Buffs (East Kent Regiment) and 4th and 5th Bns Royal West Kent Regiment
- 5th Provisional Field Ambulance from 2/3rd East Anglian and 3/2nd Wessex Field Ambulances Royal Army Medical Corps
- 5th Provisional Brigade Train Army Service Corps

During the autumn of 1915, 5th Provisional Brigade was stationed in Suffolk, attached to 58th (2/1st London) Division for administration, and to 1st Mounted Division for operations. In April 1916 2/1st East Anglian (Essex) Heavy Battery Royal Garrison Artillery joined the brigade and remained with it until the end of the war. By July 1916 the brigade was under the control of Northern Army of Central Force, with its battalions billeted as follows:

- Brigade Headquarters: St Olaves
- 63rd Provisional Bn: Gorleston
- 65th Provisional Bn: Great Yarmouth
- 68th Provisional Bn: Lowestoft
- 69th Provisional Bn: Lowestoft

=== 225th Mixed Brigade ===
The Military Service Act 1916 swept away the Home/Foreign service distinction, and all TF soldiers became liable for overseas service, if medically fit. The Provisional Brigades thus became anomalous, and at the end of 1916 their units became numbered battalions of their parent units. Part of their role was physical conditioning to render men fit for drafting overseas. 5th Provisional Brigade became 225th Mixed Brigade in December 1916, with its units redesignated as follows from 1 January 1917:

- 5th Provisional Battery became 1207th (Home Counties) Battery, RFA
- 5th Provisional Field Company became 644th (Home Counties) Field Company, RE
- 63rd Provisional Battalion became 32nd Battalion, Middlesex Regiment
- 65th Provisional Battalion became 15th Battalion, Essex Regiment
- 68th Provisional Battalion became 11th Battalion, Bedfordshire Regiment
- 69th Provisional Battalion, became 19th Battalion, Queen's Regiment
- 5th Provisional Brigade Train became 837 Company ASC

On 26 November 1917, 1207th (Home Counties) Battery transferred to 12th Brigade, Royal Field Artillery, which was reforming in 67th (2nd Home Counties) Division.

In May 1918 each of the Mixed Brigades was called upon to provide a battalion (redesignated a Garrison Guard battalion) to reconstitute the 59th (2nd North Midland) Division, which had been virtually destroyed during the German Army's Spring Offensive. 225th Mixed Brigade supplied 15th Essex to 177th (2/1st Lincoln and Leicester) Brigade and immediately raised a new 18th (Home Service) Battalion Essex Regiment to take over its coast defence duties. The brigade remained with this composition until the end of the war, after which it was demobilised.

== World War II ==
=== Formation and Service ===
The 225th Independent Infantry Brigade (Home) was formed for service in the United Kingdom on 14 November 1940, during the Second World War. It was commanded by Brigadier J.W. Pendlebury and initially consisted of newly raised infantry battalions from North-West England. Upon formation the 225th Brigade came under Western Command until 10 February 1941 when it briefly came under command of 54th (East Anglian) Infantry Division. On 12 March 1941, the Brigade became part of the newly created Northumberland County Division. The Northumberland County Division was broken up on 30 November 1941, when the headquarters of 225th Independent Infantry Brigade (Home) was re-designated HQ 35th Army Tank Brigade. Its infantry battalions were converted to the armoured role as shown:

=== Order of Battle ===
The composition of 225th Brigade was as follows:

- 10th Battalion, King's Own Royal Regiment (Lancaster) (14 November 1940 — 30 November 1941, converted that year into the 151st Regiment Royal Armoured Corps)
- 14th Battalion, King's Regiment (Liverpool) (14 November 1940 — 9 February 1941)
- 9th Battalion, Border Regiment (14 November 1940 — 17 November 1941)
- 9th Battalion, South Lancashire Regiment (14 November 1940 — 27 May 1941)
- 12th Battalion, King's Regiment (Liverpool) (28 May – 13 November 1941, converted that year into 101st Light Anti-Aircraft Regiment, Royal Artillery
- 15th Battalion, Durham Light Infantry (19 November 1941 — 30 November 1941, converted the next year into the 155th Regiment Royal Armoured Corps)
- 11th Battalion, King's Regiment (Liverpool) (19 November 1941 — 30 November 1941, converted that year into the 152nd Regiment Royal Armoured Corps)

The 225th Brigade number has never been reactivated.
