= 101st Light Anti-Aircraft Regiment, Royal Artillery =

12th Bn, King's Regiment (Liverpool) 101st Light Anti-Aircraft Regiment, RA
- Cap badge of the Royal Artillery
- Active: 4 July 1940 – 11 June 1944
- Country: United Kingdom
- Branch: British Army
- Role: Infantry; Air defence
- Size: Battalion; Regiment
- Part of: 8th AA Brigade; 10th Armoured Division

The 101st Light Anti-Aircraft Regiment, Royal Artillery, (101st LAA Rgt) was an air defence unit of the British Army during World War II. Initially raised as an infantry battalion of the King's Regiment (Liverpool) in 1940, it transferred to the Royal Artillery in 1941. It served with 10th Armoured Division in Middle East Forces until it was disbanded in June 1944 to provide infantry reinforcements.

== 12th Battalion, King's Regiment (Liverpool) ==
The 12th was one of a number of battalions of the King's formed on 4 July 1940 as part of the rapid expansion of the Army with wartime conscripts. On 20 October the 11th and 12th King's both joined 202nd Independent Infantry Brigade (Home), which was being organised by No 2 Infantry Training Group as a static defence formation in Northumbrian Area, later Northumberland County Division. On 28 May 1941, 12th King's transferred within the division to 225th Independent Infantry Brigade (Home).

Late in 1941, Northumberland County Division began to be broken up and a number of its units and formations were converted to other roles. While 225th Bde was converted into a tank brigade, 12th King's was selected to be retrained in the light anti-aircraft (LAA) role equipped with Bofors 40 mm guns. It left on 13 November 1941 and on 1 December it transferred to the Royal Artillery (RA) as 101st LAA Regiment, comprising Regimental Headquarters and 333, 334 and 335 LAA Batteries.

== 101st Light Anti-Aircraft Regiment, Royal Artillery ==
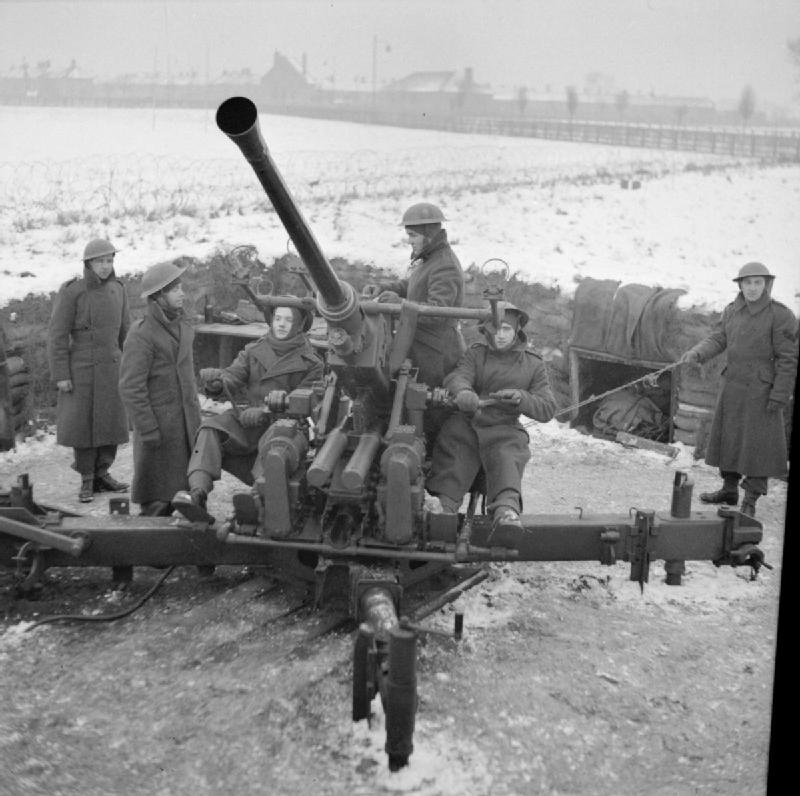
A Bofors 40 mm LAA gun crew under training, January 1942.

After initial training the regiment joined Anti-Aircraft Command, but left in February 1942 before it had been allocated to a brigade. It then came under the command of II Corps District in East Anglia. It left II Corps in the autumn and joined the GHQ Reserve, joined by a Royal Electrical and Mechanical Engineers (REME) workshop sub-section for each battery in preparation for mobile warfare. By mid-December it had come under War Office control preparatory to going overseas. It embarked in early February 1943.

=== Middle East ===
10th Armoured Division's formation sign.

In May 1943 101st LAA Rgt regiment was in Middle East Forces and joined 8th AA Brigade at El Tahag in Egypt. The North African campaign having ended, Egypt was now a rear area and the regiment was non-operational, but 8th AA Bde was in training for the forthcoming Italian campaign.

On 11 October 1943 101st LAA Rgt joined 10th Armoured Division, which had been with Ninth Army in Palestine and Syria since the Second Battle of Alamein, when its LAA regiment had left.

However, 10th Armoured Division was not destined to see any further action. Armoured divisions were at a disadvantage in Italy (one cavalry historian described 'Fighting with an armoured division in Italy was like using a dagger to open a tin') and eventually 10th Armoured's armoured brigades from Egypt were rotated with exhausted ones from Italy, and the division was broken up. 101st LAA Regiment left on 30 April 1944.

Meanwhile British forces in Italy were suffering an acute manpower shortage. In June 1944 the Chiefs of Staff decided that given the reduced activity of the Luftwaffe the number of AA regiments in Italy could be reduced, their surplus personnel being converted to other roles, particularly infantry. The Middle East School of Infantry began retraining AA gunners to reinforce depleted infantry formations rotated from Italy to Egypt. 101st LAA Regiment was accordingly disbanded on 11 June 1944. (Note: There are two apparently spurious references to 101st LAA Rgt in the North West Europe campaign. One in a listing of AA units in Operation Veritable is probably a typographic error. The Imperial War Museum photograph collection contains an item (H38831) captioned 'A soldier from 101st Light Anti-Aircraft Regiment (12th King's Regiment (Liverpool)) 3rd Division, prepares for D Day by reading at his French handbook at Camp A2 at Emsworth, near Portsmouth, Hampshire, 29 May 1944'. However, 3rd Division's LAA regiment was 92nd (Loyals) LAA Rgt.)
