= Victor Le Fanu (serjeant-at-arms) =

British Serjeant-at-Arms from 1982 to 1989

Sir Victor Le Fanu KCVO
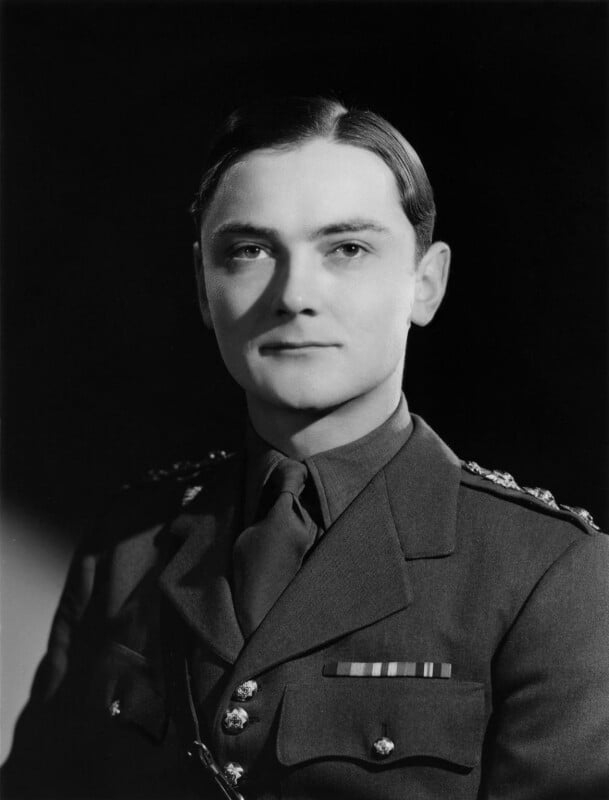
- Le Fanu in 1947

Serjeant-at-Arms of the House of Commons
- In office 1982–1989
- Monarch: Elizabeth II
- Preceded by: Sir Peter Francis Thorne
- Succeeded by: Sir Alan Urwick

Personal details
- Born: 25 January 1925
- Died: 5 February 2007 (aged 81–82)

Military service
- Allegiance: United Kingdom
- Branch/service: British Army
- Years of service: 1943 to 1963
- Rank: Major
- Unit: Coldstream Guards
- Battles/wars: Italian campaign

Sir George Victor Sheridan Le Fanu KCVO (25 January 1925 – 5 February 2007) was a British soldier who fought in World War II and served as the Serjeant-at-Arms of the House of Commons from 1982 to 1989.

== Early life ==
George Victor Sheridan Le Fanu was born on 24 January 1925. Victor was the son of Major-General Roland Le Fanu DSO MC and Marguerite Le Fanu (née Lumsden).

Le Fanu was educated at Shrewsbury School.

== Career ==
=== Coldstream Guards ===
Le Fanu left Shrewsbury School in 1943 to enlist in the Coldstream Guards.

In 1943, he joined the Second Battalion as a platoon commander and fought with them for the duration of the Italian campaign.

Le Fanu was wounded in action in July 1944.

He served as an assistant adjutant at the Royal Military Academy Sandhurst from 1949 to 1952.

He returned to the Second Battalion as an adjutant from 1952 until 1955.

=== House of Commons ===
Le Fanu joined the House of Commons as the Deputy Assistant Serjeant-at-Arms in 1963, serving in this position until 1976.

Le Fanu then served as Assistant Serjeant-at-Arms from 1976 to 1981.

He became the Deputy Serjeant-at-Arms in 1981 to 1982.

Le Fanu was appointed the Serjeant-at-Arms in 1982, and served in this position until his retirement in 1989.

== Retirement and death ==
In retirement, Le Fanu served as the Chairman of Morley College from 1992 to 2000 and as a trustee of the Wall Trust from 1991 to 2003.

Le Fanu died on 5 February 2007.

== Personal life ==
Le Fanu married Elizabeth Hall in 1956.

== Legacy ==
Sir William McKay, the Clerk of the House of Commons from 1998 to 2002, described Le Fanu as "kind and courteous in all circumstances, but firm when he had to be".
