= Sept-Vents =

- Part of Val de Drôme
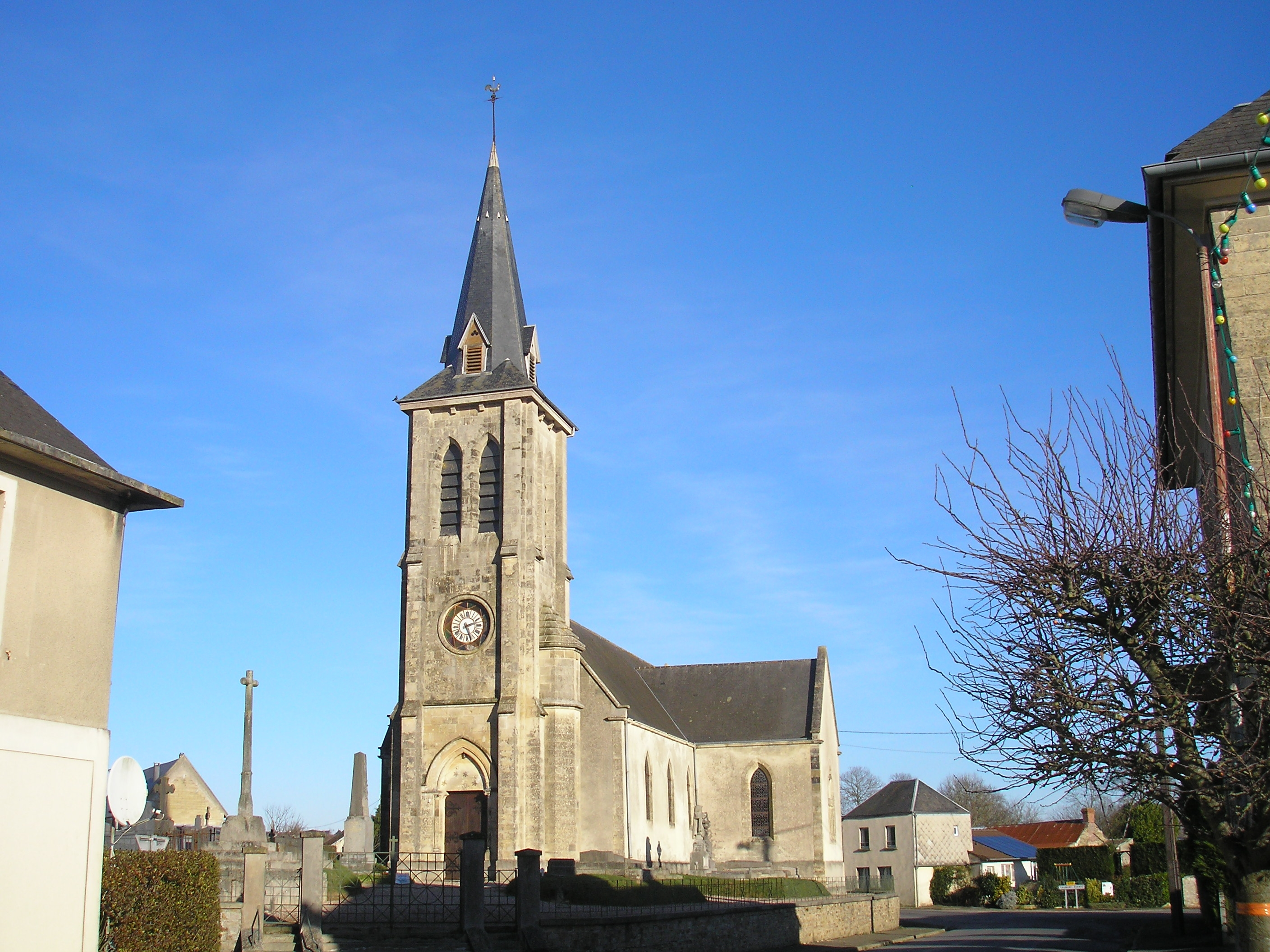
- Location of Sept-Vents
- Location within France Location within Normandy
- Coordinates: 49°04′36″N 0°49′09″W
- Country: France
- Region: Normandy
- Department: Calvados
- Arrondissement: Vire
- Canton: Les Monts d'Aunay
- Commune: Val de Drôme
- Area^{1}: 12.52 km^{2} (4.83 sq mi)
- Elevation: 250 m (820 ft)
- Highest elevation: 233 m (764 ft)
- Lowest elevation: 94 m (308 ft)
- Population (2023): 437
  - Density: 34.9/km^{2} (90.4/sq mi)
- Time zone: UTC+01:00 (CET)
  - Summer (DST): UTC+02:00 (CEST)
- Postal code: 14240
- ^{1} French Land Register data, which excludes lakes, ponds, glaciers > 1 km^{2} (0.386 sq mi or 247 acres) and river estuaries.

Sept-Vents (French pronunciation: [sevɑ̃]) is a former commune in the Calvados department in the Normandy region in northwestern France. On 1 January 2017, it was merged into the new commune Val de Drôme.

== See also ==
- Communes of the Calvados department
