= 15th (Scottish) Infantry Division =

WWII British Army unit

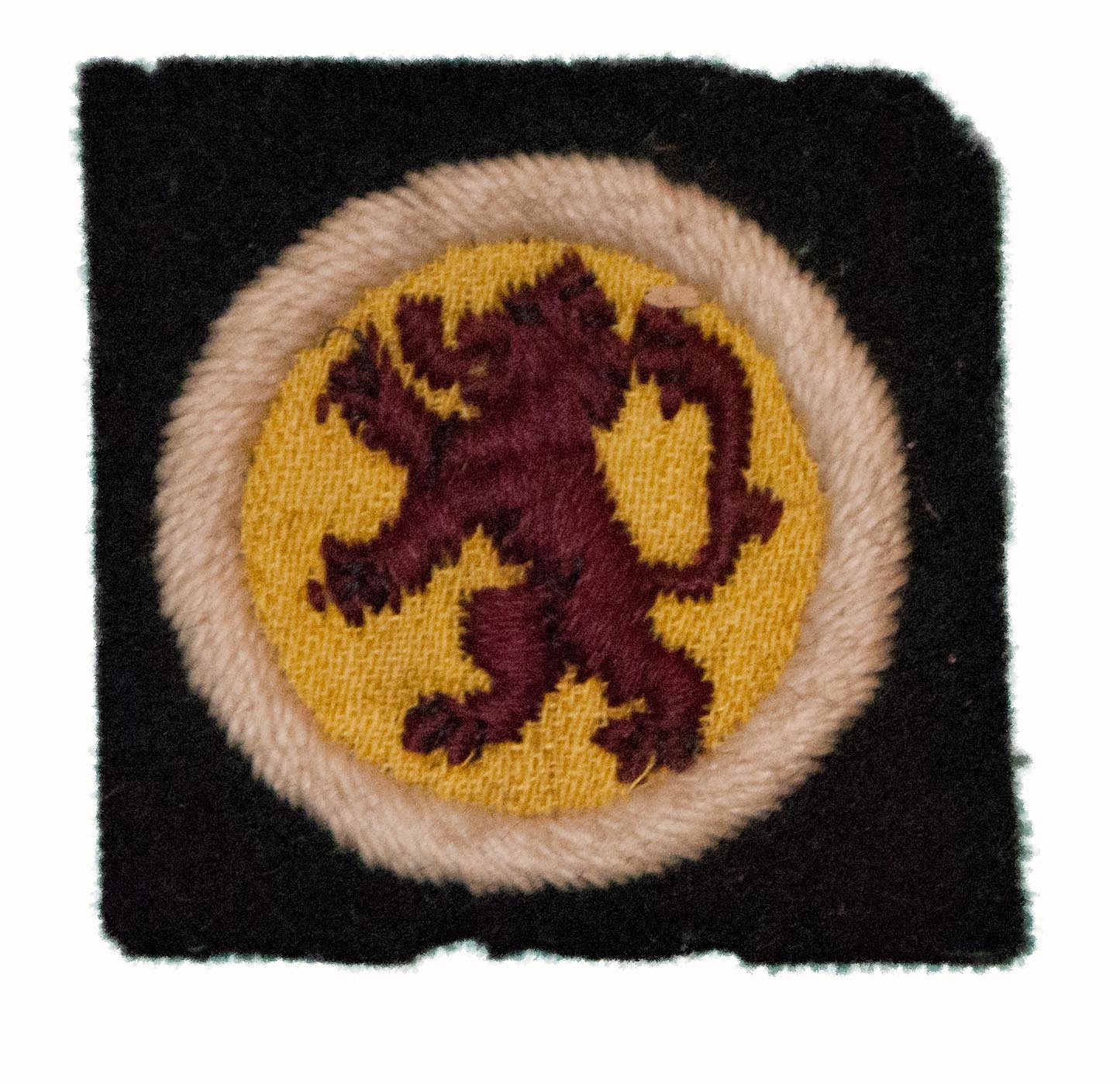
- The shoulder insignia of the division: part of the Scottish coat of arms, inside the letter 'O' to correspond with division's number.
- Active: 1939–1946
- Branch: Territorial Army
- Type: Infantry; Mixed
- Role: Home defence and infantry
- Size: War establishment strength: 13,863–18,347 men (Note: This is the war establishment, the on-paper strength. The war establishment for an infantry division during 1939–1940 was 13,863 men; as of 1941, it increased to 17,298 men; for the final two years of the war, it was 18,347 men. A 'Mixed Division' had an establishment of 16,119 men.); Actual: Varied (Note: For example: prior to the launch of Operation Epsom, on 26 June 1944, the division was 15,591 men strong; prior to the launch of Operation Bluecoat, on 30 July 1944, the division numbered 16,970 men.)
- Engagements: Operation Epsom

Commanders
- Notable commanders: Gordon MacMillan

The 15th (Scottish) Infantry Division was an infantry division of the British Army that served during the Second World War. It was raised on 2 September 1939, the day before war was declared, as part of the Territorial Army (TA) and served in the United Kingdom and later North-West Europe from June 1944 to May 1945.

== Background ==
During the 1930s, tensions increased between Germany and the United Kingdom and its allies. In late 1937 and throughout 1938, German demands for the annexation of the Sudetenland in Czechoslovakia led to an international crisis. To avoid war, the British Prime Minister Neville Chamberlain met with German Chancellor Adolf Hitler in September and brokered the Munich Agreement. The agreement averted a war and allowed Germany to annexe the Sudetenland. Although Chamberlain had intended the agreement to lead to further peaceful resolution of issues, relations between both countries soon deteriorated. On 15 March 1939, Germany breached the terms of the agreement by invading and occupying the remnants of the Czech state.

On 29 March, British Secretary of State for War Leslie Hore-Belisha announced plans to increase the part-time Territorial Army (TA) from 130,000 to 340,000 men and double the number of TA divisions. (Note: The Territorial Army (TA) was a reserve of the British regular army made up of part-time volunteers. By 1939, its intended role was the sole method of expanding the size of the British Army. (This is comparable to the creation of Kitchener's Army during the First World War.) Existing territorial formations would create a second division using a cadre of trained personnel and, if needed, a third division would be created. All TA recruits were required to take the general service obligation: if the British Government decided, territorial soldiers could be deployed overseas for combat. (This avoided the complications of the First World War-era Territorial Force, whose members were not required to leave Britain unless they volunteered for overseas service.)) The plan was for existing TA divisions, referred to as the first-line, to recruit over their establishments (aided by an increase in pay for Territorials, the removal of restrictions on promotion which had hindered recruiting, construction of better-quality barracks and an increase in supper rations) and then form a new division, known as the second-line, from cadres around which the divisions could be expanded. This process was dubbed "duplicating". The 15th (Scottish) Infantry Division was to be a second-line unit, a duplicate of the first-line 52nd (Lowland) Infantry Division. In April, limited conscription was introduced. This resulted in 34,500 twenty-year-old militiamen being conscripted into the regular army, initially to be trained for six months before deployment to the forming second-line units. It was envisioned that the duplicating process and recruiting the required numbers of men would take no more than six months. Some TA divisions had made little progress by the time the Second World War began in September; others were able to complete this work within a matter of weeks.

== Home Service ==
=== Formation ===
Divisional insignia in 1939

The embryo of the 15th (Scottish) Infantry Division was formed on 26 August 1939, administered by the 52nd Division, and became an independent formation on 2 September 1939. It took control of the 44th, the 45th and the 46th Infantry Brigades. Due to the lack of official guidance, the newly formed formations were at liberty to choose numbers, styles, and titles. The division adopted the number, title, and divisional insignia of their First World War counterpart, the 15th (Scottish) Division. The brigades did likewise. The divisional insignia, the letter 'O' (being the 15th letter of the alphabet), differed slightly from the original, by not including a triangle inside the circle.

On formation, the 44th (Lowland) Infantry Brigade consisted of the 8th Battalion, Royal Scots; the 6th Battalion, King's Own Scottish Borderers; and the 7th Battalion, King's Own Scottish Borderers. The 45th (Lowland) Infantry Brigade comprised the 6th Battalion, Royal Scots Fusiliers; and the 9th and the 10th Battalions, Cameronians (Scottish Rifles). The 46th (Highland) Infantry Brigade had the 10th and the 11th Battalions, Highland Light Infantry; and the 2nd Battalion, Glasgow Highlanders. The division was initially assigned to Scottish Command, and Major-General Roland Le Fanu became the general officer commanding. Le Fanu's prior experience included staff appointments, and he had fought in the 1937 Waziristan campaign. While primarily made up of Scots, recruits were posted to the division from across the United Kingdom, particularly England.

=== Home defence ===
The war deployment plan for the TA envisioned that its divisions would be deployed overseas, as equipment became available, to reinforce the British Expeditionary Force (BEF) that had already been dispatched to Europe. The TA would join regular army divisions in waves as its divisions completed their training, the final divisions deploying one year after the war began. However, during the opening months of the war, the division lacked the required equipment and personnel. September saw the division drained of manpower. Soldiers, aged 19, were reassigned to other formations; the Ministry of Labour allocated other men to essential industries; and medical standards weeded out those considered unfit. The division was initially scattered across southern Scotland without access to training facilities. On 30 September, after the requisition of civilian transport, the division moved to the Scottish Borders, south of Edinburgh, to start training.

In October 1939, the Commander-in-Chief, Home Forces, General Walter Kirke, was tasked with drawing up a plan, codenamed Julius Caesar, to defend the United Kingdom from a potential German invasion. The division's role in this was largely to defend the Edinburgh and Forth areas. (Note: Julius was the codeword to bring troops to a state of readiness within eight hours. The codeword Caesar meant an invasion was imminent, and units were to be readied for immediate action. Kirke's plan assumed that the Germans would use 4,000 paratroopers, followed by 15,000 troops landed via civilian aircraft once airfields had been secured (Germany only actually had 6,000 such troops), and at least one division of 15,000 troops to be used in an amphibious assault.) It was not until December that the division moved to undertake this role, with the 44th Brigade positioned astride the Firth of Forth. The rest of the division was based around Glasgow, on either side of the Firth of Clyde. On paper, an infantry division was to have seventy-two modern 25-pounder field guns. By November, the divisional artillery comprised just eight First World War-vintage 4.5 inches (110 millimetres) howitzers. By January, this had increased to sixteen 4.5 in (110 mm) howitzers, in addition to eight First World War-era 18-pounder field guns.

In April 1940, the division marched back to the Borders, and used the move as a training exercise. Elements of the division were then used to provide logistical support for units en route to fight in the Norwegian Campaign. On 9 April, following the start of the campaign, the second-line infantry divisions were requested to each form an independent infantry company of 289 volunteers, who would be deployed to Norway. The 15th Division formed No. 10 Independent Company, but it was not deployed. When the campaign ended in failure, the division was ordered to move south into England to make room for the returning troops. This move promoted Kirke to complain that the division was being moved against his wishes, despite the defensive role assigned to it for southern Scotland. The move took the division to Wiltshire, with the intent to intensively prepare for its deployment to France. Following the German invasion of France and the Low Countries, the English east coast was seen as the area most under threat from German invasion. The division then moved to Essex to defend the coast from Harwich, in the north, to Southend-on-Sea, in the south. To prevent a German invasion, including potential tank attacks, the divisional artillery now comprised twelve 4.5 in (110 mm) howitzers, six 18-pounder field guns, and four Ordnance QF 2-pounder anti-tank guns (compared to an establishment of 48). This was roughly on par with the other eight divisions that had been assigned to defend the coast, although the 15th was one of only two that included anti-tank guns. Additional equipment included 47 Boys anti-tank rifles (against an establishment of 361), 63 Universal Carriers (establishment of 140), and 590 Bren light machine guns (establishment of 644). The division co-operated with the forming Local Defence Volunteers, laid landmines, and erected anti-invasion obstacles within its operating area.

On 9 July, George VI inspected elements of the division at Colchester. The next month, on 2 August, Lieutenant-General Alan Brooke, now Commander-in-Chief, Home Forces, visited the division. Brooke recorded in his diary "Do not think much of [Le Fanu], and doubtful whether he is good enough." Regarding the division's rank and file, he wrote they were "good but [require] a great deal more training." On 23 August, Le Fanu was replaced by Major-General Robert Cotton Money. On 31 October, George VI visited the divisional headquarters, and provided authorization for the lion rampant, from Royal Arms of Scotland, to be added within the 'O' of the divisional insignia. The division remained on the coast, and trained through to the end of the year.

On 30 January 1941, Major-General Oliver Leese took command of the division. Later in the month, the division moved northeast to Suffolk, in East Anglia. The division maintained a coastal defence role, with the 44th Brigade based at Lowestoft, the 45th Brigade situated between Dunwich and Aldeburgh, and the 46th Brigade between Orford and Felixstowe. This left a gap between the 44th and the 45th Brigades, which was filled by the 37th Independent Infantry Brigade. This brigade reported directly to XI Corps, and was not part of the division. On 17 June 1941, Major-General Philip Christison replaced Leese. By September, the division's artillery regiments had all been outfitted with a full complement of 25-pounder field guns.

=== Divisional changes ===
Due to the large number of men allocated to the infantry, in 1941, the British Army instituted reforms to build-up other arms and formations. As a result, several divisions were to be disbanded or reduced. This included the 15th (Scottish), which was placed on the lower establishment in November 1941. This meant that the division was detailed for home defence, compared to a higher establishment division that were intended to be deployed overseas for combat. The division was stripped of artillery and engineer units, and used as a source of reinforcements for oversea units. After being downgraded, the division moved north to Northumberland. It took up position at Newcastle and along the coast north of the city, as well as continued training. On 14 May 1942, Major-General Charles Bullen-Smith took command.

On 5 January 1943, the 45th Brigade was removed from the division and replaced by the 6th Guards Tank Brigade. This brought the division inline with the 'mixed division' concept. Lieutenant-General Giffard Le Quesne Martel, head of the Royal Armoured Corps, described this as "the absorption of the armoured forces into the rest of the army", which required a division to decrease from three to two infantry brigades, and have a tank brigade, equipped with infantry tanks, assigned in place of the lost infantry. On 28 March 1943, the division was raised to the higher establishment, officially as a 'mixed division'. It was intended to bring the division up to strength, an establishment of 16,119 men and 205 tanks, by June. Accordingly, additional units were transferred to the division. Training now had an emphasis on combined arms warfare. The division was assigned to the VIII Corps, on 20 June 1943. The following month, on 14 July, the division was brought back up to a strength of three infantry brigades, while still retaining the tank brigade, when the 227th (Highland) Infantry Brigade joined. On 27 August 1943, Major-General Gordon MacMillan arrived from commanding a brigade in combat in North Africa, to take command of the division.

On 5 September, the 'mixed division' concept was abandoned as it was considered to have not been successful, and the 6th Guards Tank Brigade left on 9 September. The division then moved to Yorkshire, and was based around Bradford, Harrogate, and Leeds. The remainder of the 1943 and the opening of 1944 was used to conduct extensive training and divisional exercises, as the division had been assigned to partake in Operation Overlord, the invasion of German-occupied France. In February 1944, General Bernard Montgomery, commander of the 21st Army Group, the main Allied formation in Operation Overlord, visited the division and addressed the men. In the following weeks, the division was visited by George VI, Queen Elizabeth, their daughter Elizabeth, Prime Minister Winston Churchill, and the VIII Corps commander Lieutenant-General Richard O'Connor. In April, the division moved to Sussex, and was concentrated in camps in the Brighton area. The division's advanced parties departed for London on 8 June, and moved to France on 13 June. On 11 June, the division proper started to move to marshalling areas in London and Southampton, and were transported to France piecemeal with the last unit not arriving until 24 June.

== Overseas service ==
=== Operation Epsom ===
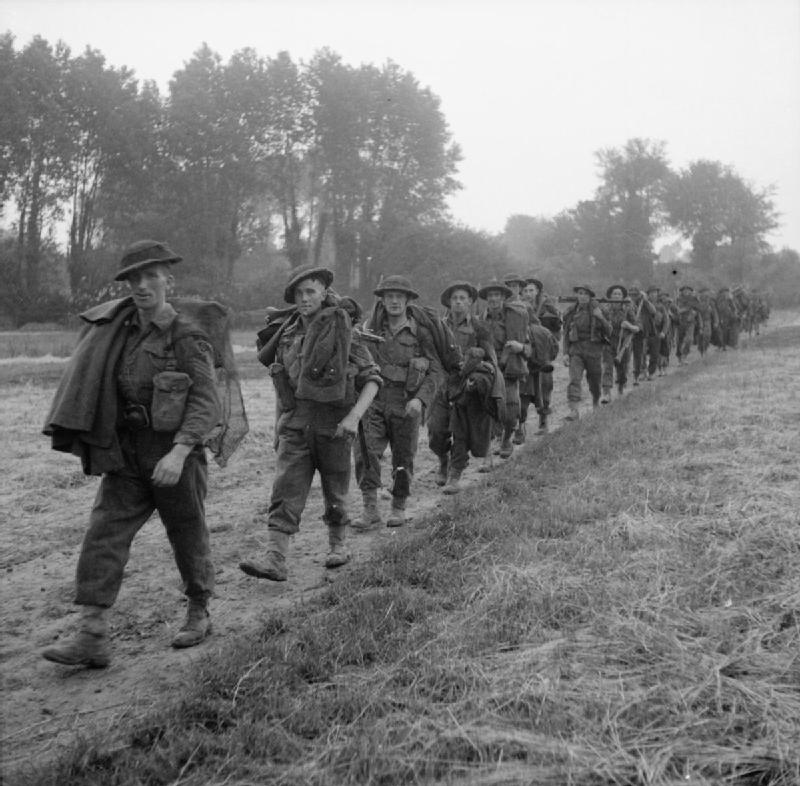
Men of the 10th Highland Light Infantry during Operation Epsom, 26 June 1944.

The Norman city of Caen was the primary British objective during the Normandy landings, and was seen as key for future operations. However, the city did not fall on 6 June, and was not taken in follow-up fighting. The recently assembled VIII Corps was assigned to a renewed effort to capture the city. Operation Epsom intended for the corps to attack to the west of Caen, cross the Odon and Orne Rivers, capture an area of high ground near Bretteville-sur-Laize and thereby encircle the city. The operation was the 15th (Scottish) Infantry Division's baptism of fire, and it was assigned a key role in the opening phases: to clear several villages that stood between them and the Odon, and to capture bridges to allow the 11th Armoured Division to cross the river and race for Bretteville-sur-Laize. Afterwards, the 15th Division would clear the Odon river valley.

Phase I of the attack was conducted by the 44th and the 46th Brigades, supported by Churchill tanks from the 31st Tank Brigade and specialist tanks from the 79th Armoured Division. Both brigades attacked at 07:30 behind a rolling barrage. German mortar fire responded immediately. Despite delays caused by minefields and German holdouts in the forward area, the brigades captured most of their objectives before noon: La Gaule, Le Haut, and Cheux. An effort by the 46th Brigade to advance 2,000 yards (1,800 m) to the southeast of Cheux, to capture a hill, was partially successful. They seized the northern slope, but the Germans retained the southern. Elements of the 44th Brigade were engaged in an all day struggle to capture and hold St Mauvieu, which they did after fending off several counterattacks. Both brigades suffered mounting losses. The historian Carlo D'Este highlighted the 46th Brigade's 2nd Battalion, Glasgow Highlanders, who suffered around 200 casualties including 12 officers. This represented 24 per cent of the battalion's officers and "nearly 25% of the entire rifle battalion."

Phase II of the attack started late, around 18:00, as the 227th Brigade was delayed by traffic congestion at Cheux. As it moved south, the brigade was engaged by German tanks and made little progress. However, one company broke through the German lines and reached Colleville. On the morning of 27 June, the 46th Brigade secured the northern slope of the hill that had been previously denied to them. Afterwards, both the 44th and the 46th Brigades were relieved by the 43rd (Wessex) Infantry Division. Part of the 227th Brigade made little progress pushing south beyond Cheux, due to mortar fire and German tanks, although they repulsed one attack and destroyed four tanks. The rest of the brigade cleared Colleville, captured Tourville-sur-Odon, destroyed additional German tanks, and by the afternoon had seized the bridge across the Odon at Tourmauville. This allowed the 11th Armoured Division to cross and proceed with the operation.

Fighting continued the next day, with most of the division involved. Additional bridges and villages were secured along the Odon valley. This included Gavrus, which was taken by the 2nd Battalion, Argyll and Sutherland Highlanders and who were then left isolated. The Germans also began a counterattack on the north side of the Odon into the division's western flank. The back and forth fighting, which spread to both sides of the Odon, continued through 29 June and resulted in the division fending off the attacks and was able to secure additional territory. The historian Lloyd Clark placed the division's defensive success on "careful positioning", taking advantage of terrain, as well as "excellent leadership and tactical prowess at the small unit level." Due to heavy casualties suffered by the 2nd Battalion, Argyll and Sutherland Highlanders, they withdrew and the division ceded control of Gavrus on 30 June. During the course of the day, additional counterattacks on the division were repulsed. The 53rd (Welsh) Infantry Division then relieved the 15th, although the 44th Brigade remained engaged through July 1. They repulsed further German counterattacks, and were relieved by the Welsh division on 2 July.

Hugh Martin, the author of the divisional history, described Epsom as the "fiercest fighting that the Division was to know in the whole war", which captured 10 square miles (26 km^{2}) of territory, and resulted in "one-quarter" of all casualties suffered by the division through the entire campaign. The division suffered 288 men killed, 1,638 wounded, and 794 men missing. D'Este commented that the number of riflemen in a division was around 4,600, and the losses suffered by the division represented "in excess of 50%" of the division's infantry.

=== Normandy, July ===
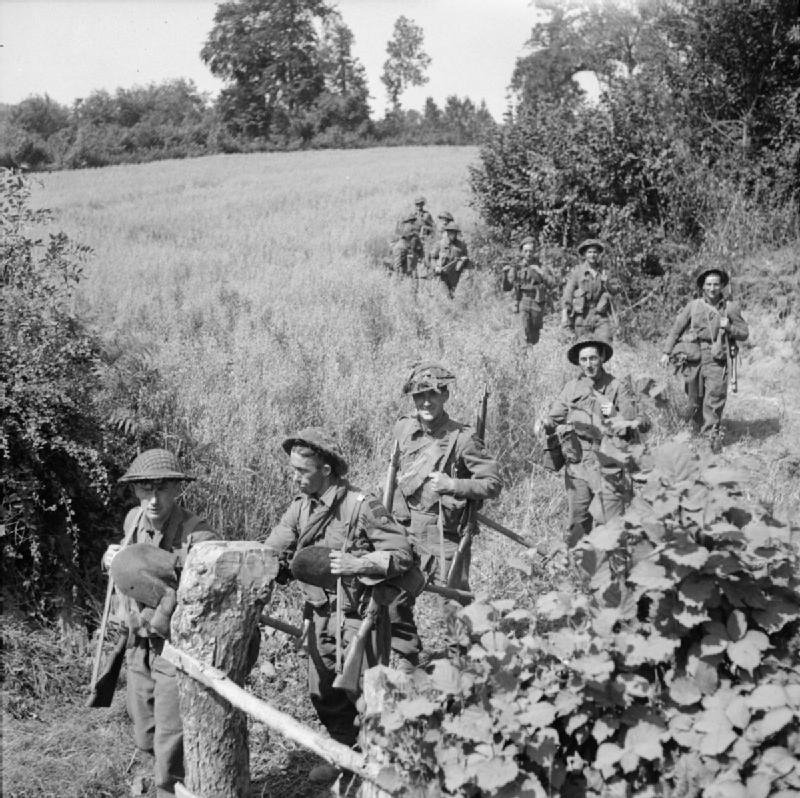
Men of the 7th Seaforth Highlanders, 4 August 1944.

The next divisional action was limited to artillery support, with the artillery supporting a Canadian effort to capture the Carpiquet airfield during Operation Windsor on 4 July. By 7 July, the division had been reinforced to make up most of its Epsom losses. The 44th and the 46th Brigades were then assigned to support the 43rd (Wessex) Infantry Division during Operation Jupiter. The 44th Brigade occupied positions along the Odon river, previously held by the 227th Brigade during Operation Epsom. This freed up the 43rd Division, for their attack on the dominant high ground south of the river. The 44th Brigade supported this effort by engaging in mutual mortar bombardments with the Germans on the heights. The 46th Brigade, supported by elements of the 7th Royal Tank Regiment, cleared the area between the Odon and Orne near Eterville. They also supported the 43rd Division by taking control of several hamlets that the latter had captured, and fended off several counterattacks. By 10 July, both brigades had been relieved.

On 12 July, the division was assigned to XII Corps, and three days later attacked towards Bougy, Evrecy, and Maizet, as part of Operation Greenline; a diversionary attack in support of Operation Goodwood. German resistance and counterattacks, heavy fighting, flanking fire, and a direct hit on one of the brigade's tactical headquarters caused delays and communication breakdowns. In the end, the division captured Bougy, fell short of taking Evrecy, and failed to advance on Maizet. However, the fighting had attracted German armour reserves away from the Goodwood battle area, and thus achieved the operation's objective.

=== Breakout from Normandy ===
On 23 July, the division relocated to Caumont and relieved the 5th US Infantry Division. This was part of a strategic realignment of the Normandy beachhead, as the British Second Army shifted three divisions west to allow the American First Army to launch a breakout offensive. In support, the British Army launched Operation Bluecoat that aimed to secure the American flank and reach the town of Vire. The division was faced by the recently arrived 326th Infantry Division, who took over well-prepared defenses that were behind a minefield. For Bluecoat, the division reverted to the command of VIII Corps and was supported by mine-clearing tanks, Churchill tanks, and Churchill Crocodiles. On 30 July, the division attacked through the Normandy bocage, with the goal of reaching Hill 309 by the end of the day. The infantry were soon subjected to heavy artillery fire, while terrain and mines resulted in the infantry and tanks separating. The division's first objective was Sept-Vents and a nearby wood. It was intended to be captured by 09:55, but it took six-hours to achieve this due to mines, traffic jams, heavy fighting, and the methodical clearing of the village. In the meantime, the supporting tanks pressed forward alone and captured Hill 309 in the mid-afternoon, around the same time Sept-Vents was cleared. They then held the hill until relieved by the advancing Scottish infantry, around 22:00.

The following day, the division consolidated their captured positions, while two armoured divisions continued the corps' attack. On 1 August, the division fended off numerous counterattacks that were launched upon its positions, primarily by the 21st Panzer Division, over a 12-hour period. Over the following days, while most of the division retained their defensive position, elements were used to clear territory captured or bypassed by the advancing armour. During this period, MacMillan was wounded by shell fire and was replaced by the 46th Brigade commander, Colin Muir Barber, who was made a major-general. On 6 August, the leading elements of the division reached Estry and the nearby Hill 208, and fought a back and forth battle for both locations over the following days. On 13 August, the division was transferred to near Caen, and ended its participation in the Normandy fighting.

The Allied advance culminated in the defeat of the German military in Normandy at the Falaise Pocket. Afterwards, the Second Army advanced towards the Seine, in pursuit of the retreating German forces, with XII Corps spearheaded by the 15th Division. Late on 26 August, the division crossed the river largely unopposed. Additional crossings, meeting light resistance, were made under the cover of darkness the next morning. The bridgehead was then consolidated.

=== Belgium and the Netherlands ===
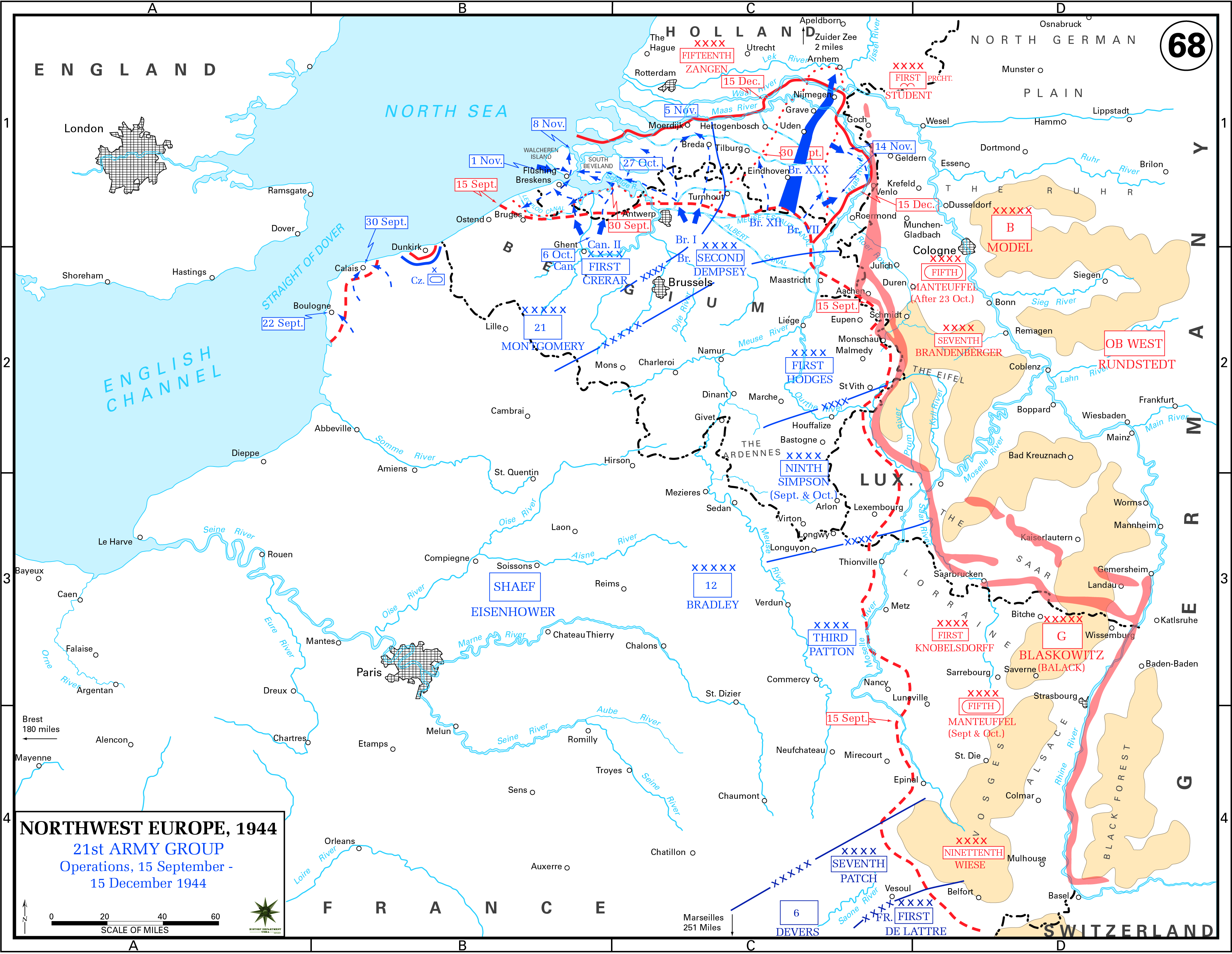
The map depicts the advance made during Operation Garden by the Second Army. Allied formations are depicted in blue, and the German in red.

On 2 September, one battalion moved east from the Seine and was followed by the rest of the division the next day. Four days later, the bulk of the division arrived at Courtrai, Belgium, and immediately shelled retreating German forces. Over the following days, the division cleared the area between the Scheldt and the Lys rivers, and took several hundred prisoners. The Glasgow Highlanders (46th Brigade) were dispatched to reinforce the effort to take Ghent. They fought an opposed crossing of the Ghent–Terneuzen Canal on 9 September, and spent the following two days engaged in close fighting in and around the northern section of the city as they cleared it building by building, and took several hundred more prisoners.

The division then moved into the bridgehead that had been established over the Albert Canal, at Gheel. From this foothold, on 14 September, the division launched several assaults to cross the Meuse-Escaut Canal (referred to as the 'Junction Canal' in the divisional history). They were only able to secure one bridgehead, at Aart, and battled to hold it over the next six days. The bridgehead, around 400 yards (370 m) in depth, was heavily contested by the Germans and caused the division 700 casualties. This action was credited with diverting German resources away from Joe's Bridge, where XXX Corps began their assault from at the start of Operation Market Garden. On 20 September, the 7th Armoured Division relieved the 15th Division, which (minus the 227th Brigade) moved east to Lommel, and took up position in a bridgehead that had been secured by the 53rd Division.

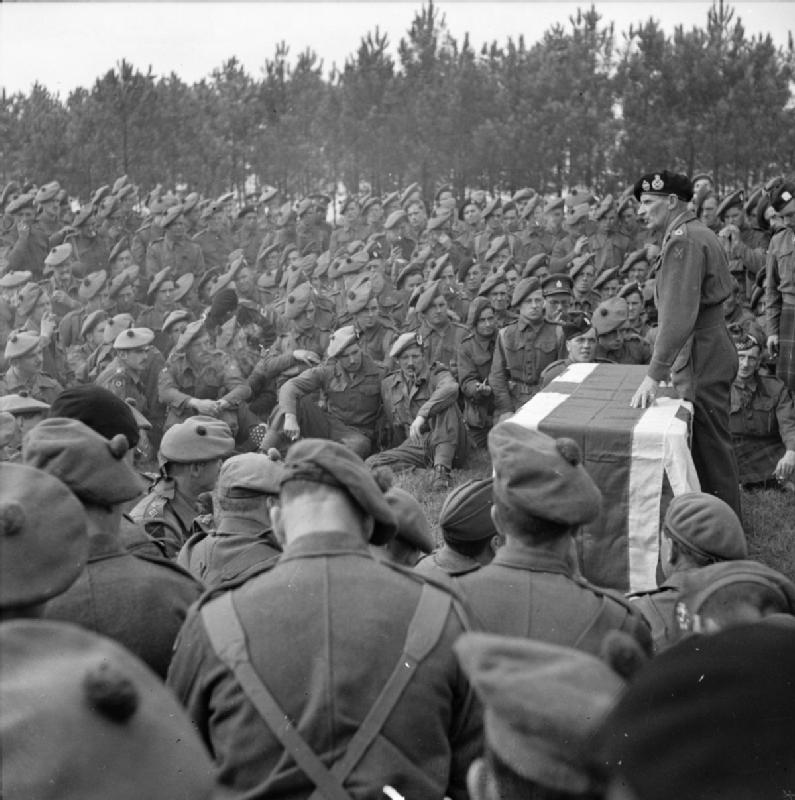
Field Marshal Sir Bernard Montgomery addressing men of the 15th (Scottish) Division during an investiture ceremony, 16 September 1944.

Operation Market Garden intended to land the First Allied Airborne Army behind German lines to seize six bridges and other key areas, to facilitate an advance by XXX Corps through the Netherlands and across the Rhine and into Germany. XII Corp was assigned to protect the left flank of XXX Corps' advance. Consequently, the 15th Division crossed the Wilhelmina Canal (Wilhelminakanaal), unopposed on 21 September, and advanced towards the village of Best, on the northwest outskirts of Eindhoven. 'D' Company of the 7th Seaforth Highlanders (46th Brigade) entered the village the next day and believed it to be unoccupied. However, their arrival had surprised the German garrison, and after the loss of 33 men, 'D' Company withdrew. The 46th Brigade and the divisional reconnaissance regiment the launched further attacks, which turned into a five-day battle for control of the village. It saw methodical house to house fighting, and repeated assaults to clear German forces out of the train station and cement factory on the south side of the village. Meanwhile, the 44th Brigade was initially held in reserve, to be used to clear the road that XXX Corps had advanced along, if needed. But on 24 September, it was released from this duty. It and the 227th Brigade (which had now rejoined the division) attacked northwards, and cleared the area up to the river Dommel and captured several hamlets. Martin recounted that a medical officer from the 44th Brigade strayed into German lines while searching for wounded soldiers, during this period. After giving his word not to provide intelligence to the division, he was released to continue his search for the wounded. Operation Haggis followed, which was the relief of the division by the 51st (Highland) Infantry Division and was finalized on 3 October. Afterwards, the division was then given a three-week break at Helmond, east of Eindhoven. This time was used to rest, reinforce, train, and a 'Battle School' was formed. (Note: A battle school provided soldiers with live-fire conditions that intended to simulate the noise and chaos of battle.)

The division was then assigned to VIII Corps, which was tasked with defeating three German divisions that were based west of the Meuse along the eastern flank of the corridor captured during Operation Market Garden. Prior to the 15th (Scottish) being committed to this, Montgomery assigned the division back to XII Corps that been tasked with attacking west from the corridor. This operation, codenamed Operation Pheasant, was designed to support the ongoing effort to clear the Scheldt estuary. The division's task was to capture the town of Tilburg. On 20 October, the division moved back to Best, and started their advance three days later. German forces had largely abandoned the area in front of the division, so the initial move was unopposed. On 26 October, a brief action was fought to capture the town of Oisterwijk. The next day, the division (now supported by the 4th Armoured Brigade and the Dutch Princess Irene Brigade) advanced into the Tilburg, and seized key points throughout the city. Martin claimed that the division skirmished with Dutch Waffen SS units in Tilburg. The following day, the division conducted a clearing operation, and then declared the city liberated. On 30 October, the division entered Asten, south of Helmond, in response a German counterattack launched to the east of Eindhoven.

The division then fought at Meijel, Blerick, the Battle of Broekhuizen.

=== Germany ===
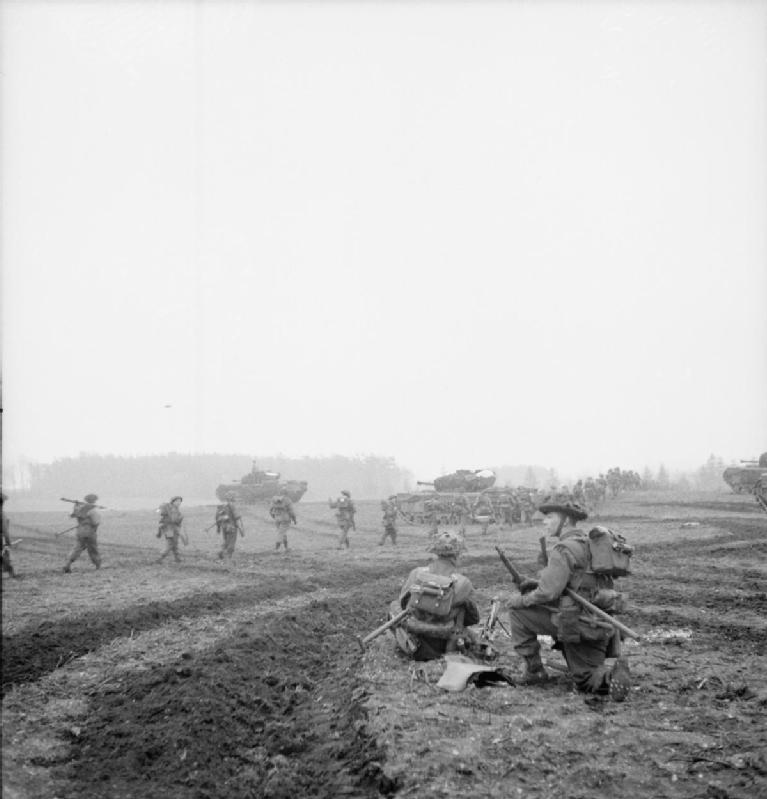
Churchill tanks supporting infantry of the 2nd Battalion, Argyll and Sutherland Highlanders during Operation 'Veritable', 8 February 1945.

The division then entered Germany, and fought in Operation Veritable, crossed the Rhine, took part in Operation Plunder in late March 1945, part of the Western Allied invasion of Germany.

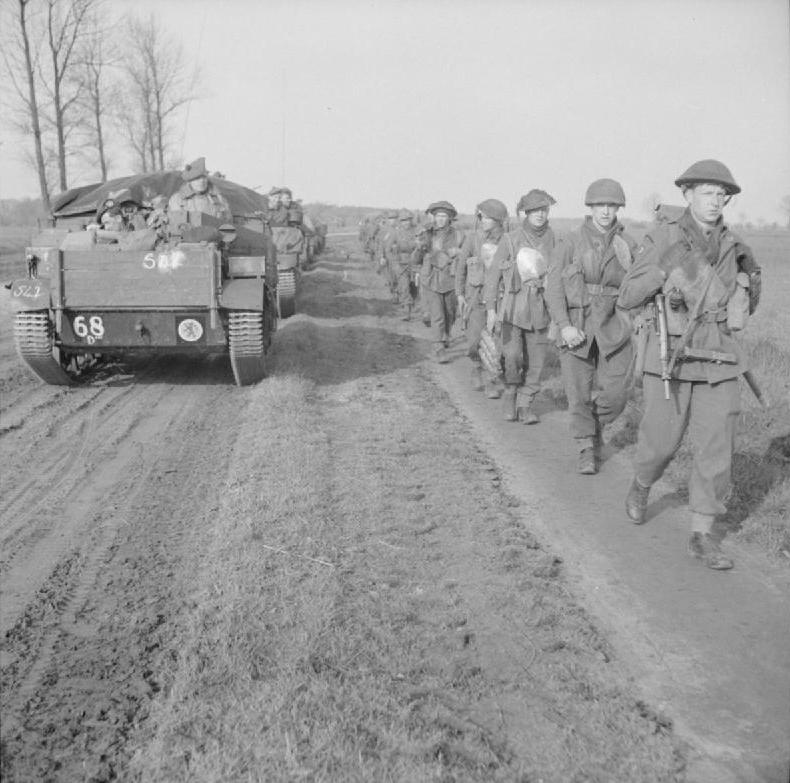
Universal Carriers and infantry of the 2nd Battalion, Gordon Highlanders move up to cross the Elbe, 29 April 1945.

The particular distinction for the 15th Scottish was to be selected to lead the last set piece river crossing of the war, the assault across the River Elbe (Operation Enterprise) on 29 April 1945 spearheaded by the 1st Commando Brigade, after which they fought on to the Baltic occupying both Lübeck and Kiel. The 15th (Scottish) was the only division of the British Army during the Second World War to be involved in three of the six major European river assault crossings; the Seine, the Rhine and the Elbe.

On 10 April 1946, the 15th (Scottish) Infantry Division was finally disbanded. Its battle casualties– killed, wounded and missing – in nearly eleven months of fighting were 11,772 with over 1,500 men killed. According to D'Este, the "15th (Scottish) Division was considered to be the most effective and best led infantry division in 21st Army Group."

== General officers commanding ==
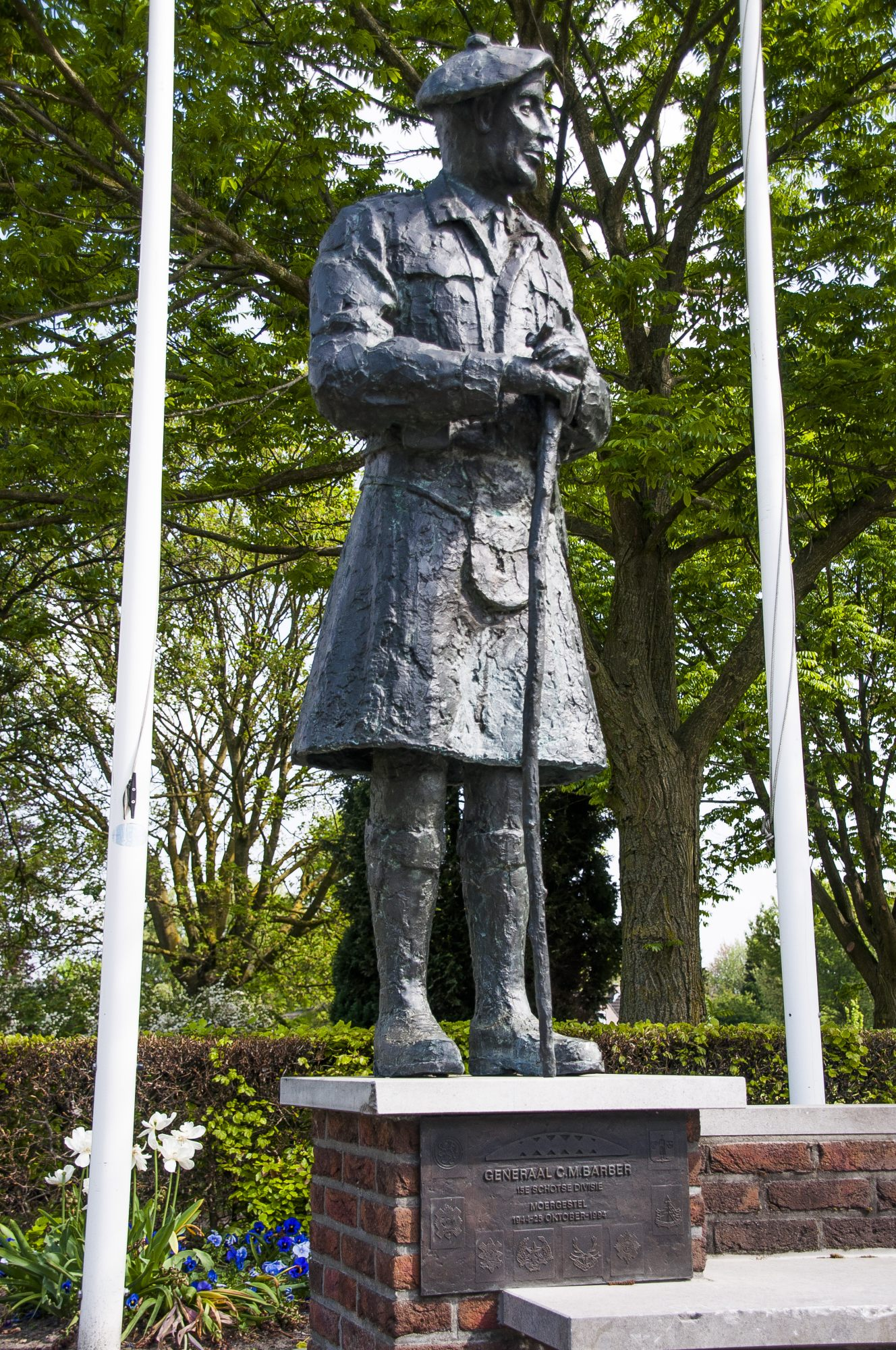
War memorial with statue of General C.M. Barber in The Netherlands

The division had the following commanders:

Appointed	Name
29 August 1939	Major-General R. Le Fanu
19 August 1940	Brigadier J.A. Campbell
23 August 1940	Major-General R.C. Money
27 January 1941	Brigadier J.A. Campbell
30 January 1941	Major-General Oliver Leese
17 June 1941	Major-General Philip Christison
14 May 1942	Major-General Charles Bullen-Smith
14 August 1943	Brigadier H.D.K. Money
27 August 1943	Major-General Gordon MacMillan
5 August 1944	Major-General Colin Muir Barber

== Order of battle ==
15th (Scottish) Infantry Division

44th (Lowland) Infantry Brigade

- 8th Battalion, Royal Scots
- 6th Battalion, King's Own Scottish Borderers
- 7th Battalion, King's Own Scottish Borderers (left 5 October 1942)
- 44th Infantry Brigade Anti-Tank Company (formed 14 October 1940, absorbed into 15th Battalion, Reconnaissance Corps, 2 January 1941)
- 11th Battalion, Argyll and Sutherland Highlanders (from 14 October 1942, left 27 December 1942)
- 6th Battalion, Royal Scots Fusiliers (from 28 December 1942)

45th (Lowland) Infantry Brigade (left 5 January 1943)

- 6th Battalion, Royal Scots Fusiliers (detached 12 December 1939, rejoined 3 July 1940; left 27 December 1942)
- 9th Battalion, Cameronians (Scottish Rifles) (left 27 December 1942)
- 10th Battalion, Cameronians (Scottish Rifles)
- 45th Infantry Brigade Anti-Tank Company (formed 1 September 1940, absorbed into 15th Battalion, Reconnaissance Corps, 2 January 1941)
- 10th Battalion, Black Watch (Royal Highland Regiment) (from 27 December 1942)
- 11th Battalion, Argyll and Sutherland Highlanders (from 28 December 1942)

46th (Highland) Infantry Brigade

- 10th Battalion, Highland Light Infantry (left 1 November 1941)
- 11th Battalion, Highland Light Infantry (left 19 November 1941)
- 2nd Battalion, Glasgow Highlanders
- 46th Infantry Brigade Anti-Tank Company (formed 1 September 1940, absorbed into 15th Battalion, Reconnaissance Corps, 2 January 1941)
- 7th Battalion, Seaforth Highlanders (from 15 November 1941)
- 7th Battalion, Queen's Own Cameron Highlanders (from 18 November 1941, left 23 March 1942)
- 4th Battalion, Queen's Own Cameron Highlanders (from 24 March 1942, left 16 November 1942)
- 10th Battalion, Black Watch (Royal Highland Regiment) (from 19 November 1942, left 27 December 1942)
- 9th Battalion, Cameronians (Scottish Rifles) (from 28 December 1942)

227th (Highland) Infantry Brigade (from 14 July 1943)

- 10th Battalion, Highland Light Infantry
- 2nd Battalion, Argyll and Sutherland Highlanders
- 2nd Battalion, Gordon Highlanders (from 31 July 1943)

6th Guards Tank Brigade (from 15 January, left 9 September 1943)

- 4th Tank Battalion, Grenadier Guards
- 4th Tank Battalion, Coldstream Guards
- 3rd Tank Battalion, Scots Guards
- 1st Commando Brigade (attached from 19 April 1945 to end of the war)

Divisional Troops

- 15th (Scottish) Divisional artillery, Royal Artillery
  - 129th (Lowland) Field Regiment (left 9 May 1942)
  - 130th (Lowland) Field Regiment (left 4 January 1942)
  - 131st (Lowland – City of Glasgow) Field Regiment
  - 181st Field Regiment (from 7 November 1942)
  - 190th Field Regiment (from 29 March 1943)
  - 64th (Queen's Own Royal Glasgow Yeomanry) Anti-Tank Regiment (left 30 March 1942)
  - 97th Anti-Tank Regiment (from 15 August 1942, left 5 December 1944)
  - 102nd (Northumberland Hussars) Anti-Tank Regiment (from 5 December 1944)
  - 119th Light Anti-Aircraft Regiment, Royal Artillery (from 18 May 1943)
- 15th (Scottish) Divisional engineers, Royal Engineers
  - 278th Field Company
  - 279th Field Company (left 9 February, rejoined 12 July 1940)
  - 280th Field Company (left 15 December 1942)
  - 20th Field Company (from 26 March 1943)
  - 281st Field Park Company (left 12 January 1943)
  - 624th Field Park Company (from 14 January 1943)
  - Divisional field store section (from 12 January 1942, until 1 February 1943)
  - 26th Bridging Platoon (from 1 October 1943)
  - 15th (Scottish) Division Postal Unit
- 15th (Scottish) Divisional Signals Regiment, Royal Corps of Signals
- 1st Battalion, Middlesex Regiment (from 1 October 1943 as Support Battalion, became Machine Gun Battalion on 18 March 1944)
- 15th Battalion, Reconnaissance Corps (from 2 January 1941; became 15th Independent Company on 4 December 1941; 15th Independent Squadron on 6 June 1942; finally 15th Scottish Reconnaissance Regiment on 15 February 1943) (Note: In June 1942, the Reconnaissance Corps universally adopted cavalry nomenclature. As a result, all companies were redesignated as squadrons.)
- Royal Army Service Corps
  - 62nd Company (joined July 1943)
  - 399th Company (joined July 1943)
  - 283rd Company (Operation Overlord and beyond)
  - 284th Company (Operation Overlord and beyond)
- Royal Electrical and Mechanical Engineers (formed and joined during July and August 1943)
  - 44th Lowland Infantry Brigade Workshops
  - 46th Highland Infantry Brigade Workshops
  - 227th Highland Infantry Brigade Workshops
  - 15th Infantry Troops Brigade Workshops
- Royal Army Medical Corps
  - 153rd Field Ambulance (joined July 1943)
  - 20th Field Dressing Station (joined August 1943)
  - 22nd Field Dressing Station (joined August 1943, until March 1943)
- Royal Army Ordnance Corps
  - Divisional Ordnance Park (joined July 1943)
  - 305th Mobile Laundry and Bath Unit (joined July 1943)
- 39th Field Security Section, Intelligence Corps (joined July 1943)
- 15th (Scottish) Division Provost Company, Corps of Military Police (Operation Overlord and beyond)

== See also ==
- List of British divisions in World War II
- Structure of the British Army in 1939

== Notes ==
Footnotes

Citations
