= Northumberland County Division =

- Formation sign of the Northumberland County Division
- Active: 24 February 1941 – 21 December 1941
- Country: United Kingdom
- Branch: British Army
- Type: Static Division
- Role: Home Defence

The Northumberland County Division was a formation of the British Army in the Second World War, its headquarters were formed on 24 February 1941. It ceased to function on 1 December 1941, and the headquarters were disbanded on 21 December 1941. It was commanded by Major-General R. C. Money and was an infantry only formation consisting of three Independent Infantry Brigades (Home). Combat support, artillery, engineers etc., would be provided by other local formations. It was commanded by X Corps until 9 April, IX Corps until 30 November and War Office control from then until disbandment.

== Order of Battle ==
All brigades were part of the division from 12 March to 30 November 1941.

202nd Independent Infantry Brigade (Home)

Commanded by Brigadier H. Pawle to 20 May 1941, Brigadier G.F. Gough to 11 November 1941, and then Lt-Colonel A.E. Belcher.

- 11th Battalion, King's Regiment (Liverpool) – left 18 November 1941, to 225th Brigade
- 12th Battalion, King's Regiment (Liverpool) – left 27 May 1941, to 225th Brigade
- 11th Battalion, Green Howards – left 26 November 1941
- 7th Battalion, East Lancashire Regiment – left 26 November 1941
- 9th (Garrison) Battalion, Green Howards – 14 to 30 November 1941, from 216th Brigade

The brigade headquarters was disbanded with the division.

216th Independent Infantry Brigade (Home)

Commanded by Brigadier T.E.M. Battersby to 1 July 1941, Brigadier W. Carden Roe to 29 October 1941, then Lt-Colonel H. Ross-Skinner.

- 12th Battalion, Royal Scots left 21 October 1941
- 13th Battalion, Highland Light Infantry left 17 November 1941
- 11th Battalion, Gordon Highlanders left 6 October 1941
- 9th (Donside) Battalion, Gordon Highlanders 11 October to 15 November 1941
- 7th Battalion, Seaforth Highlanders 11 to 31 October 1941
- 9th (Garrison) Battalion, Green Howards 31 October to 14 November 1941, to 202nd Brigade

The brigade headquarters was disbanded with the division.

225th Independent Infantry Brigade (Home)

Commanded by Brigadier J.W. Pendlebury to 17 November 1941, then Lt-Colonel H.S. Crow.

- 10th Battalion, King's Own Royal Regiment (Lancaster)
- 14th Battalion, King's Regiment (Liverpool) left 9 February 1941
- 9th Battalion, Border Regiment left 17 November 1941
- 9th Battalion, South Lancashire Regiment left 27 May 1941
- 12th Battalion, King's Regiment (Liverpool) 28 May to 13 November 1941, from 202nd Brigade
- 15th Battalion, Durham Light Infantry from 19 November 1941
- 11th Battalion, King's Regiment (Liverpool) from 19 November 1941, from 202nd Brigade

The brigade headquarters was converted into the 35th Army Tank Brigade. Its remaining infantry battalions were converted to the armoured role.

== See also ==
- List of British divisions in World War II

== Bibliography ==
- Cole, Howard (1973). Formation Badges of World War 2 Britain, Commonwealth and Empire. London: Arms and Armour Press.
- Joslen, Lt-Col H.F. (1990) [1st. Pub. HMSO:1960]. Orders of Battle, Second World War, 1939–1945. London: London Stamp Exchange. ISBN 0-948130-03-2.
