= 80th (Lowland – City of Glasgow) Field Regiment, Royal Artillery =

80th (Lowland – City of Glasgow) Field Regiment, RA 280 (City of Glasgow) Field Regiment, RA
- Royal Artillery cap badge
- Active: 1921–1 May 1961
- Country: United Kingdom
- Branch: Territorial Army
- Role: Field artillery
- Size: 2–4 Batteries
- Part of: 52nd (Lowland) Division
- Garrison/HQ: Townhead, Glasgow
- Engagements: Battle of the Scheldt; Operation Blackcock; Operation Veritable

80th (Lowland – City of Glasgow) Field Regiment was a Royal Artillery (RA) unit of Britain's part-time Territorial Army (TA) during World War II. It was descended from the 1st Lanarkshire Artillery Volunteers, first raised in Scotland in 1859. It served in Home Forces for most of the war, undergoing training in mountain warfare and air-portable operations before eventually going into action at sea level in the Battle of the Scheldt. It then took part in the fighting in the Rhineland (Operations Blackcock and Veritable), and then the drive to Bremen. It was reformed in the postwar TA, and continued until 1961.

== Origin ==
The 1st Lanarkshire Artillery Volunteers were formed as part of the Volunteer Force in 1859. By the outbreak of World War I it had become III and IV Lowland Brigades (Note: In contemporary RA usage a brigade was a lieutenant-colonel's command consisting of independent batteries 'brigaded' together; it was not comparable with an infantry or cavalry brigade commanded by a brigadier-general.) of the Royal Field Artillery (RFA) in the Lowland Division of the Territorial Force. During World War I these brigades served with the division (later the 52nd (Lowland) Division) in Egypt and Palestine.

The 3rd Lowland Brigade re-formed in 1920, and was redesignated as the 80th (Lowland) Brigade, RFA, the following year when the TF was reconstituted as the Territorial Army (TA). It continued to be part of 52nd (Lowland) Division and had the following organisation:

- HQ at 21 Taylor Street, Townhead, Glasgow
- 317 (1st City of Glasgow) Bty at Burkley Street, Glasgow
- 318 (2nd City of Glasgow) Bty at Percy Street, Maryhill, Glasgow
- 319 (3rd City of Glasgow) Bty at 21 Taylor Street, Townhead, Glasgow
- 320 (4th City of Glasgow) (Howitzer) Bty at Butterbiggins Road, Glasgow

In 1924 the RFA was subsumed into the Royal Artillery (RA), and the word 'Field' was inserted into the titles of its brigades and batteries. The establishment of a TA divisional artillery brigade was four 6-gun batteries, three equipped with 18-pounders and one with 4.5-inch howitzers, all of World War I patterns. However, the batteries only held four guns in peacetime. The guns and their first-line ammunition wagons were still horsedrawn and the battery staffs were mounted. Partial mechanisation was carried out from 1927, but the guns retained iron-tyred wheels until pneumatic tyres began to be introduced just before World War II.

The brigade changed its subtitle to 'Lowland – City of Glasgow' from August 1937. In 1938 the RA modernised its nomenclature and a lieutenant-colonel's command was designated a 'regiment' rather than a 'brigade'; this applied to TA field brigades from 1 November 1938.

== Mobilisation ==
The TA was doubled in size after the Munich Crisis of 1938, and most regiments split to form duplicates. Part of the reorganisation was that field artillery regiments changed from four six-gun batteries to an establishment of two batteries, each of three four-gun troops. For the 80th (Lowland – City of Glasgow) Fd Rgt this resulted in the following organisation from 31 March 1939:

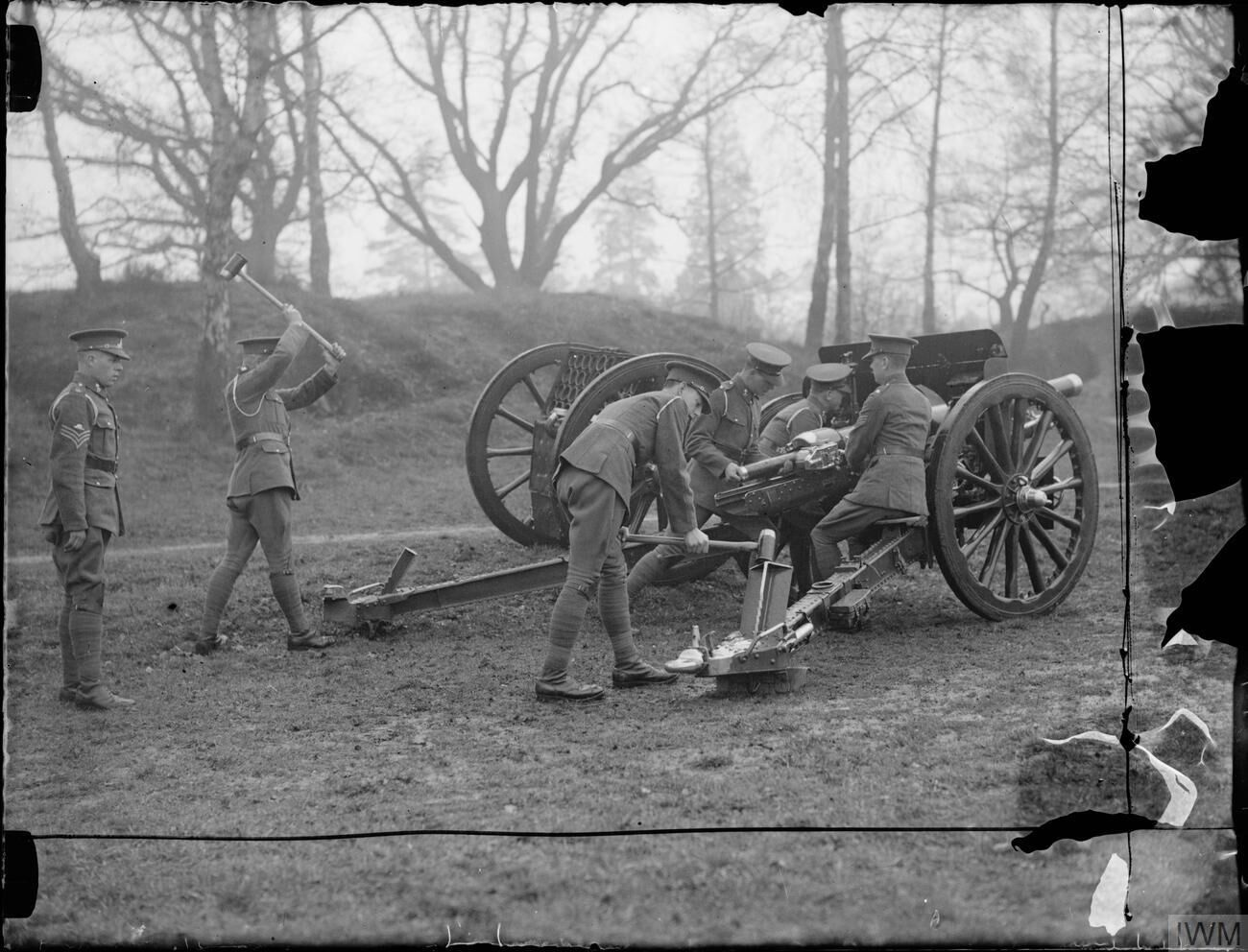
Emplacing an 18-pounder with wooden wheels at the start of World War II.

80th (Lowland – City of Glasgow) Field Regiment, Royal Artillery

- Regimental Headquarters (RHQ) at Glasgow
- 317 (1st City of Glasgow) Field Bty at Glasgow
- 318 (2nd City of Glasgow) Field Bty at Maryhill

131st Field Regiment, Royal Artillery (Note: The regiment was authorised to use its parent's 'Lowland – City of Glasgow' subtitle on 17 February 1942.)

- RHQ at Glasgow
- 319 (3rd City of Glasgow) Field Bty at Glasgow
- 320 (4th City of Glasgow) Field Bty at Townhead

== World War II ==
=== Training ===
On the outbreak of war 80th (Lowland – City of Glasgow) Field Regiment mobilised in 52nd (Lowland) Division. Apart from a period in June 1940 when the rest of the division was briefly deployed to France (and the regiment was attached to 49th (West Riding) Division from 8 to 23 June), the regiment served with it throughout the war. The division mobilised in Scottish Command but moved south to Southern Command in April 1940, then to Aldershot Command at the beginning of June until it went to France. When the bulk of the division returned from the abortive attempt to form a Second British Expeditionary Force (BEF) in France, it was assigned to II Corps in the mobile reserve around London, where 80th Fd Rgt rejoined it on 1 July. After the Battle of France the original BEF had been evacuated from Dunkirk without any of its heavy equipment. With 70 of its establishment of 72 modern Mk II 25-pounder guns, 52nd (L) Division was one of the best-equipped forces left in Home Forces. On 3 November, after the immediate risk of invasion had receded, 52nd (L) Division returned to Scottish Command where it constituted the army reserve while undergoing training.

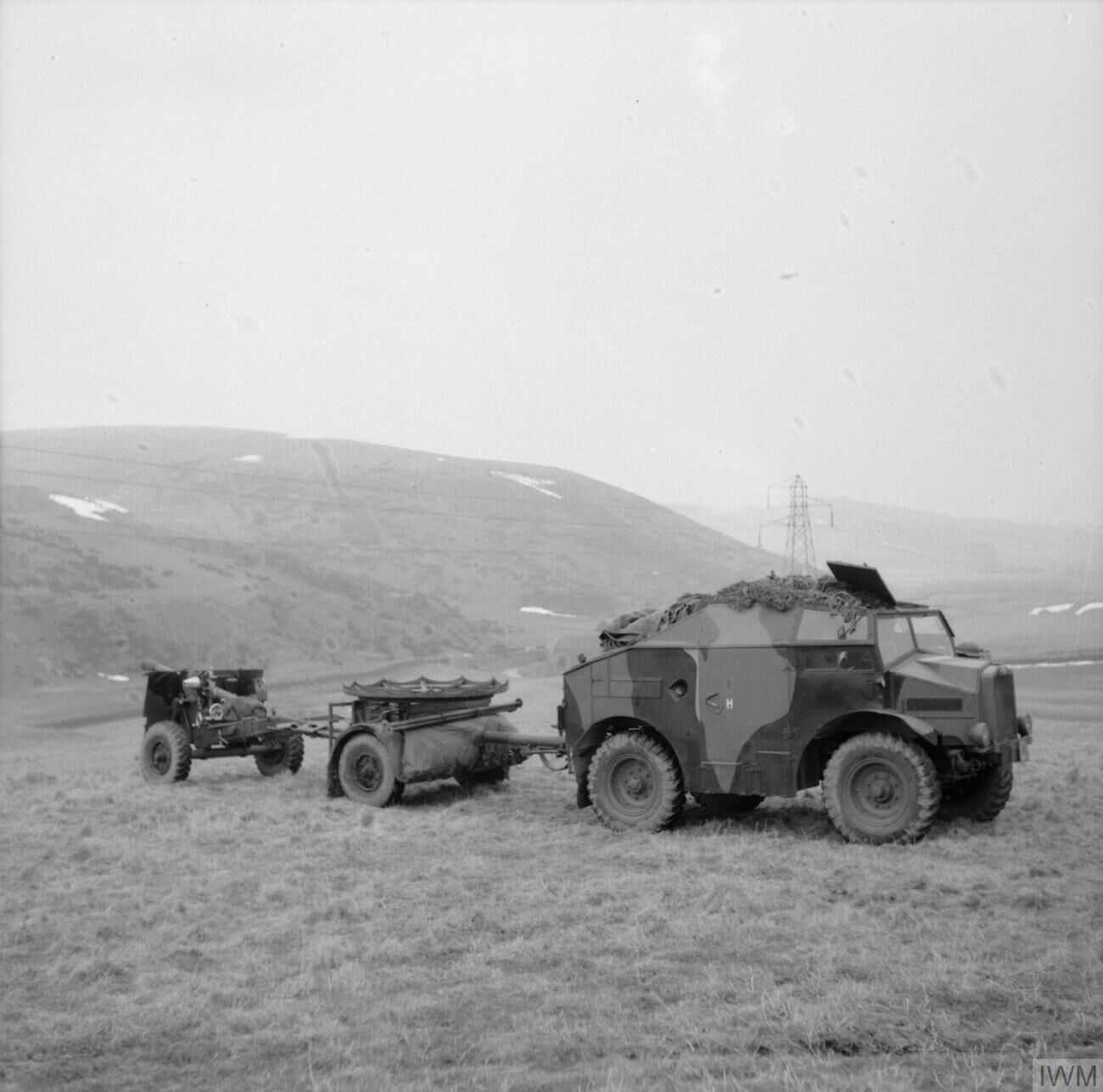
25-pounder gun and Quad gun tractor on exercise in Scotland, 1941.

One of the lessons learned from the Battle of France was that the two-battery organisation did not work: field regiments were intended to support an infantry brigade of three battalions. As a result, they were reorganised into three 8-gun batteries. 80th Field Rgt had formed its third battery, 458, by May 1941.

52nd (Lowland) Division's insignia.

In May 1942 52nd (L) Division began training in mountain warfare in the Grampian Mountains. This training reached high intensity after Major-General Neil Ritchie took command of the division in September, following his return from Eighth Army in the Western Desert. The training culminated in Exercise Goliath II, which lasted for three weeks in October 1943 under harsh conditions. After this the division was considered by some to be the 'toughest, fittest and hardest in the British Army'. Although the training was genuine, the division also played a significant role in Allied deception plans, such as Operation Tindall, designed to convince the German high command that a mythical 'Fourth Army' under General Sir Andrew Thorne was gathering in Scotland to invade Occupied Norway. This was developed into Operation Fortitude North to divert German attention away from the genuine Allied plans to invade Normandy (Operation Overlord).

This pretence was kept up for some time after the Normandy invasion began on D Day (6 June 1944). In August 1944 the division was transferred to First Allied Airborne Army and began training in airlanding operations. A number of such operations were planned and cancelled before Operation Market Garden was given the go-ahead. This was to use three parachute divisions to seize an 'airborne carpet' of bridges ahead of 21st Army Group as far as Arnhem across the Nederrijn. When Market Garden was launched on 17 September 1944, 52nd (L) Division was scheduled to be airlifted to Arnhem as soon as 1st Airborne Division had secured landing strips north of the town. However, the failure of Market Garden meant that 52nd (L) Division was never used in this role. Instead, it was sent by sea to reinforce 21st Army Group fighting its way through the Netherlands.

=== Scheldt ===
The division landed at Ostend on 15 October and under a directive issued next day by Field Marshal Montgomery, it was assigned to First Canadian Army for the operations to clear the Scheldt Estuary and bring the vital Port of Antwerp into use for the Allies. The leading elements of the division relieved the Canadians in their bridgehead over the Leopold Canal, and then went forward to occupy Aardenburg without opposition on 19 October. Early on 26 October the division carried out an amphibious assault across the western Scheldt to outflank the German defence line on the Beveland Canal (Operation Vitality II). Allied artillery accurately bombarded the landing beaches at Hoedekenskerke from 04.30, the infantry brought by landing craft from Terneuzen landed 20 minutes later, and by the end of the day had captured Oudelande. Over the following days the Germans evacuated South Beveland.

The next objective was the island of Walcheren. Troops of 157th Infantry Brigade of 52nd (L) Division and 5th Canadian Infantry Brigade fought their way over a narrow causeway with massive artillery support and secured a precarious bridgehead. When the exhausted Canadians were withdrawn the Commander, Royal Artillery (CRA), of 52nd (L) Division, Brigadier L.B.D. Burns, took command of the operation with an improvised HQ known as 'Burnfor'. A second lodgement on Walcheren was achieved by infantry of 157th Bde using stormboats and then wading across soft mud. Meanwhile, on 1 November a seaborne assault had been carried out on the west end of Walcheren Island, and 52nd (L) Division's 155th Bde had landed at Flushing on the south shore (Operation Infatuate I) behind artillery support 'on a vast scale' from across the Scheldt. Thereafter 52nd (L) Division's brigades fanned out across the island and mopped up the remaining defenders by 8 November.

=== Operation Blackcock ===
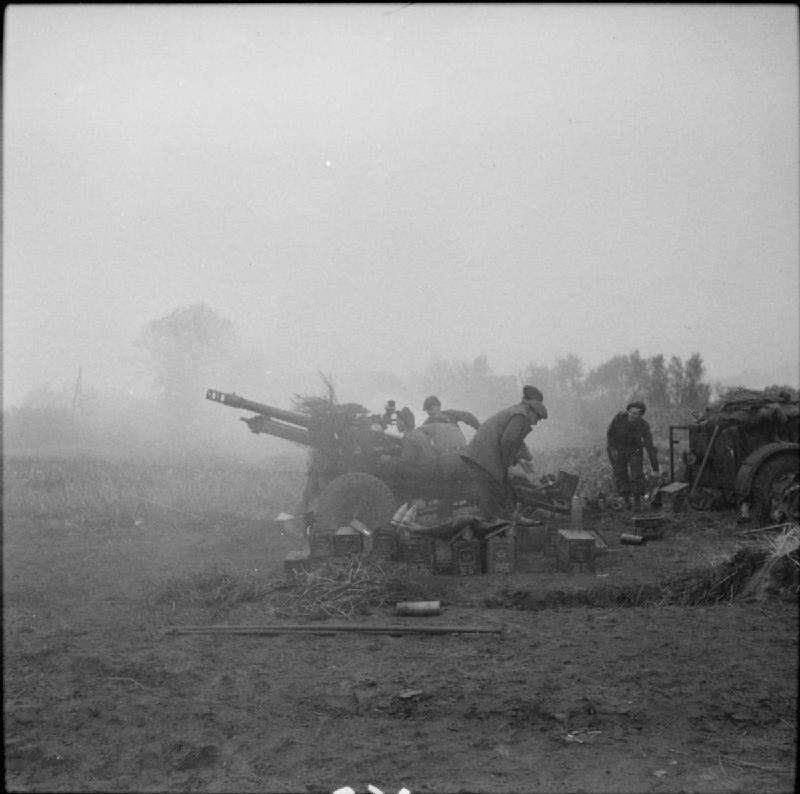
25-pounders in action in North West Europe, 1944.

52nd (L) Division remained under Canadian command, holding the line south of the River Waal, until 4 December, when it moved east to join British Second Army. In January 1945 Second Army launched Operation Blackcock to eliminate a German salient south west of the River Roer. The Germans were well dug-in and supported by artillery. 52nd (L) Division joined in on 18 January, advancing on two axes: 155th Bde with 8th Armoured Bde through Susteren to clear the Echterbosch woods, while 156th Bde supported by specialist armour from 79th Armoured Division and most of the available artillery attacked the Sittard–Heinsberg axis. Every village was defended, and the thawing ground turned to mud. Next day 157th Bde reinforced the attack. Snow showers grounded most aircraft, but the air observation post (AOP) spotter aircraft were able to fly and supplemented the artillery's forward observation officers (FOOs) in bringing down effective fire throughout the operations. When the fighter-bombers were able to fly, the artillery also carried out 'Applepie' Flak suppression fireplans to protect them. The Roer bridgehead was cleared by 26 January, and 52nd (L) Division was the first to base itself in a German town.

=== Operation Veritable ===
First Canadian Army next launched Operation Veritable to clear the Reichswald between the Rivers Maas and Rhine. This began on 8 February, and 52nd (L) Division was sent to reinforce it on 12 February. Moving down the bank of the Maas the division captured Afferden, but found itself held up by the old shell-proof Bleijenbeek Castle. However, by 3 March the division was making good progress through the wooded country south west of Weeze. On 9 March after a stiff fight it cleared the Haus Loo fort at Alpen, one of the last German outposts west of the Rhine.

=== Germany ===
Although 52nd (L) Division was holding the Rhine bank, it was designated as a follow-up formation for the crossing (Operation Plunder) and was not involved in the initial assault. However, its guns took part in the initial 'Pepperpot' bombardment before 15th (Scottish) Infantry Division passed through 52nd (L) Division to lead the assault for XII Corps. 15th (S) Division had over 700 guns of all types on call when the bombardment began at 23.30 on 23 March. The infantry set off across the river in amphibious vehicles at 02.00 on 24 March, and made rapid progress inland to link up with the airborne troops who landed during the morning (Operation Varsity). 52nd (L) Division began crossing on 25 March, its leading units coming under the command of 15th (S) Division as they mopped up the bridgehead and linked up with 6th Airborne Division. Second Army then began a rapid advance across Germany. Part of 52nd (L) Division cleaned up pockets of Germans round Ibbenbüren while the rest of the division crossed the Dortmund–Ems Canal.

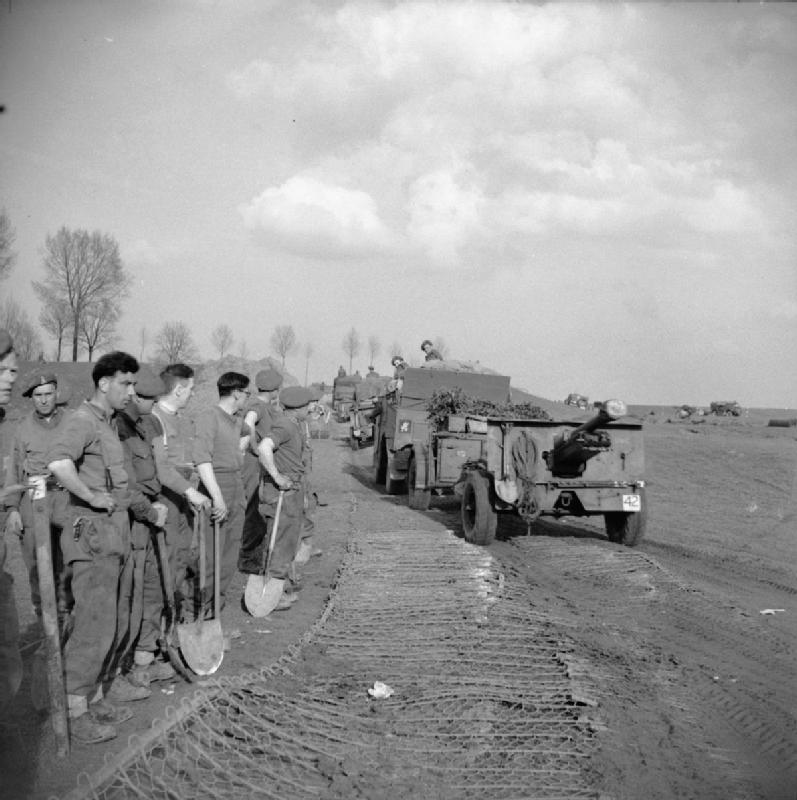
25-pounders moving up to cross the Rhine, March 1945.

As Second Army raced forwards, 52nd (L) Division was switched to XXX Corps for the attack on Bremen. Lt-Gen Brian Horrocks, commanding XXX Corps, considered that at this stage of the war, 52nd (L) Division was one of the best in Second Army because it still retained a number of the original personnel (which was a consequence of its late arrival in the theatre). From 20 to 26 April XXX Corps closed in on Bremen against stubborn resistance. The division then had to control rioting and looting in the chaotic city.

After VE Day the units of 21st Army Group were engaged in occupation duties, disarming German troops and administering the British Zone of Allied-occupied Germany. 52nd (L) Division continued doing duty in British Army of the Rhine for some months while demobilisation got under way. 80th (Lowland – City of Glasgow) Field Regiment was placed in suspended animation on 5 May 1946.

== Postwar ==
When the TA was reconstituted on 1 January 1947, the 80th reformed at Glasgow as 280 (Lowland – City of Glasgow) Medium Rgt, in 85 (Field) Army Group Royal Artillery. It reverted to a field regiment on 1 July 1950 when 85 (Fd) AGRA became HQ 52nd (Lowland) Divisional Artillery once more. In December 1955 it was redesignated 280 (City of Glasgow Artillery) Field Rgt with the following organisation:

- P (1st City of Glasgow) Bty
- Q (2nd City of Glasgow) Bty
- R (3rd City of Glasgow) Bty

With the ending of National Service there was a reduction of the TA in 1961, and most of 280 (City of Glasgow) Fd Rgt was merged into 279 (Ayrshire) Fd Rgt to form 279th (City of Glasgow & Ayrshire) Fd Rgt with the following organisation:

- RHQ at Troon
- P (1st City of Glasgow) Bty
- Q (Ayrshire) Bty
- R (3rd City of Glasgow) Bty
  Surplus personnel of 280 (City of Glasgow) Fd Rgt were transferred to 445 (Lowland) Light Anti-Aircraft Rgt.
