= Heukelom, Limburg =

Heukelom
- Hamlet
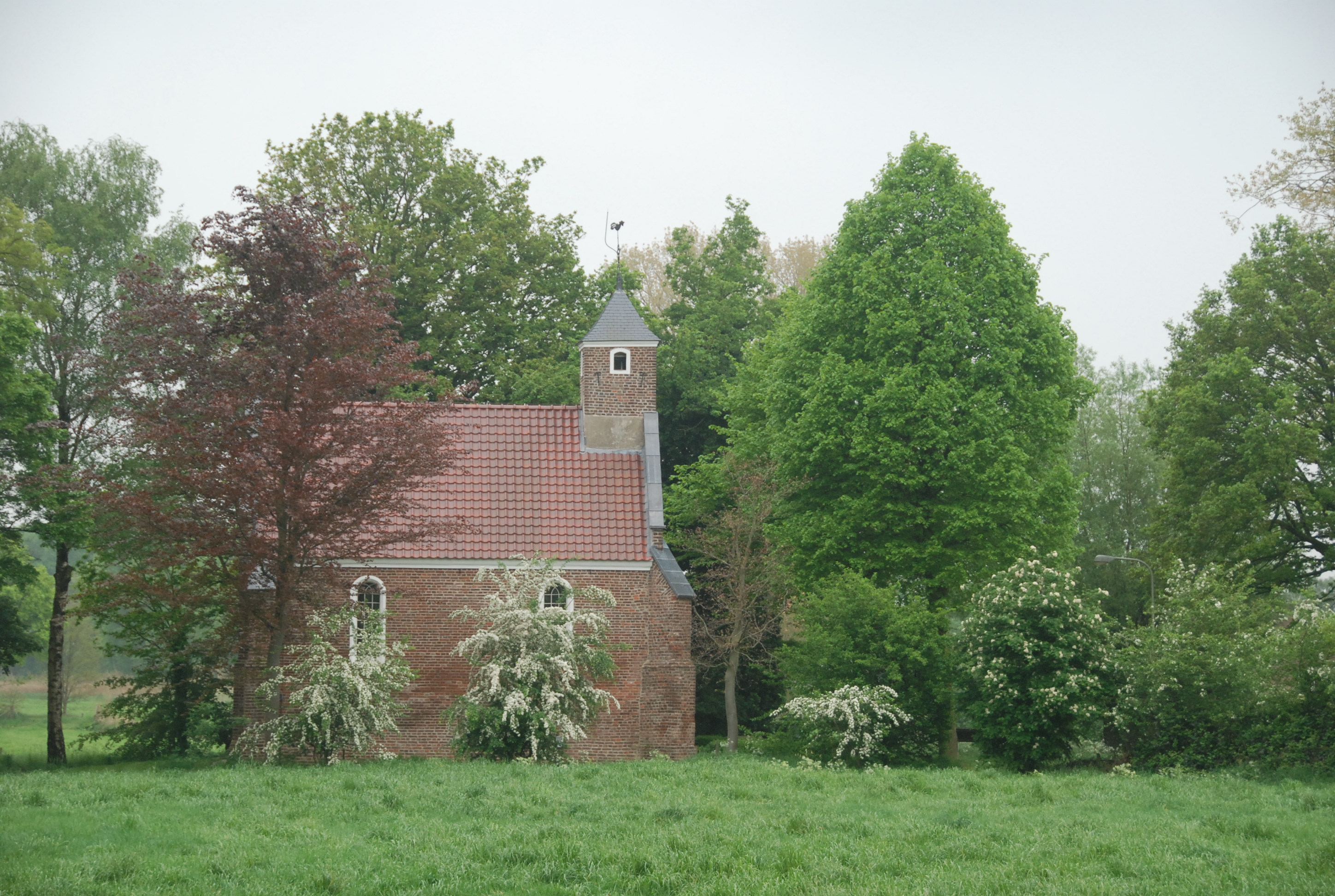
- St Antonius Chapel

- Location in the Netherlands Location in the province of Limburg in the Netherlands
- Country: Netherlands
- Province: Limburg
- Municipality: Bergen
- Time zone: UTC+1 (CET)
  - Summer (DST): UTC+2 (CEST)
- Postal code: 5851
- Dialing code: 0485

Heukelom is a hamlet in the Dutch province of Limburg. It is located in the municipality of Bergen, about 2 km south of the village of Afferden.

Heukelom is not a statistical entity, and the postal authorities have placed it under Afferden. Heukelom has one monument, the St Antonius Chapel which dates from the 17th century.
