= Bleijenbeek =

Coordinates: 51°38′6″N 6°3′5″E

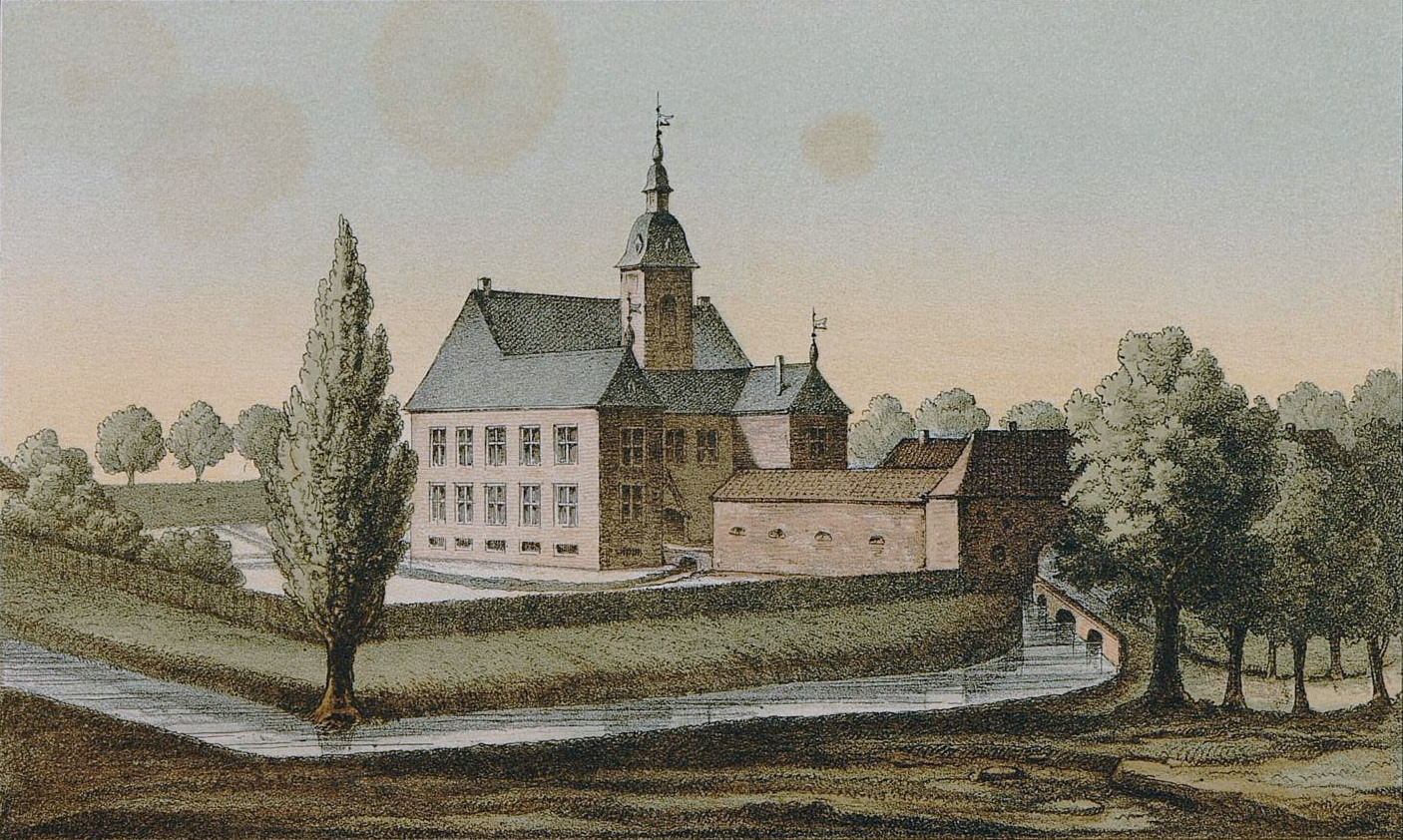
Castle Bleijenbeek around 1860

Bleijenbeek (Dutch pronunciation: [ˈblɛi.ə(m)beːk]) is a small hamlet in the Dutch province of Limburg. It is located in the municipality of Bergen, about 2 km east of Afferden.

The main building in the hamlet is the ruin of Castle Bleijenbeek. According to the 19th-century historian A.J. van der Aa, the castle is known for the numerous sieges by the armies of Guelders and Spain. In 1580, the castle was besieged by the forces of Guelders, but it was defended bravely by the lord of the castle, Marten Schenk, when the Duke of Parma sent cavalry, the besieging army had to retreat. In 1589, Schenk had changed sides, and the castle was besieged by Marcus van Rije, the stadtholder of Guelders appointed by the Spanish king; this time, the castle was conquered.
