= Klaas de Groot =

Dutch bioengineer (1940–2024)

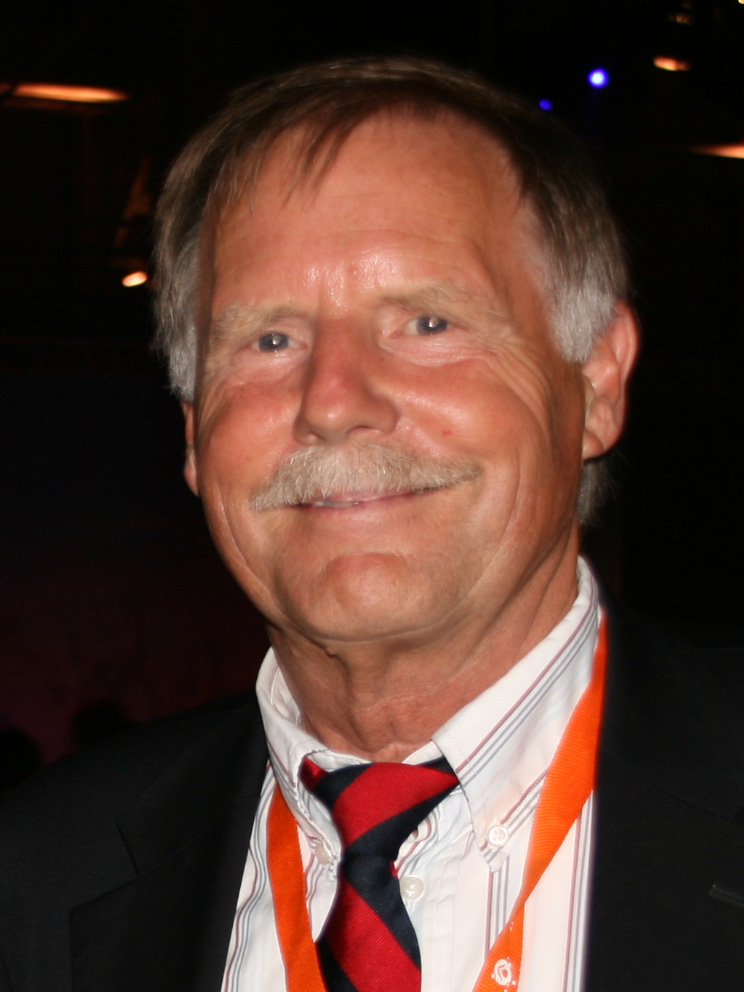
- Born: 3 November 1940; Bergen, Limburg, German-occupied Netherlands
- Died: 15 January 2024 (aged 83); Heemstede, Netherlands
- Awards: Chinese Friendship award; The Clemson award (USA); The George Winter award (EU); The Somiya Award (2003); The John Charnley Award (by the USA Hip Society); The Gold Medal by Acta Biomaterialia
- Scientific career
- Fields: Biomedical Engineering, Biomaterials, Tissue Engineering
- Workplaces: University of Twente

Klaas de Groot (3 November 1940 – 15 January 2024) was a Dutch bioengineer. He worked as professor at Leiden University and the University of Twente.

== Early life ==
De Groot was born on 3 November 1940 in Bergen, Limburg. He obtained his PhD at the University of Groningen in 1968 with a thesis titled:"Photoionization of aromatic hydrocarbons in liquid solutions".

== Career ==
In 1988 de Groot became professor of biomaterials at Leiden University. He later became professor at the Tissue Engineering Group at the University of Twente.

De Groot also worked as a visiting scientist at the UCLA bone research laboratory. His work focused on the research and development of bioceramics that resemble the composition of bone. He developed two types of bioceramic, namely bulk ceramics (dense, porous, large and small) for mechanically unloaded bone fillers, and coatings for improving the bone bonding of strong, but less biocompatible, metallic orthopedic and dental implants. His group also studied the incorporation of drugs and growth factors such as Bone Morphogenetic Proteins (BMP) into such ceramics and coatings, as well as the use of calciumphosphate particles for plastic surgery, i.e. filling and augmenting soft and hard tissues for cosmetic reasons).

== CAM Implants ==
De Groot's research products are being marketed by CAM Implants (now Cam Bioceramics), IsoTis and Stryker (USA).

Prior to his present appointment he worked at Vrije Universiteit (VU), Amsterdam (until 1988) and Leiden University (until 2001), at both places as head of the department of biomaterials.

De Groot was a co-founder of CAM Implants BV (now Cam Bioceramics), and IsoTis. He published more than 350 articles and he was the co-inventor of about 10 patents.

== Death ==
De Groot died in Heemstede on 15 January 2024, at the age of 83.
