= 131st (Lowland – City of Glasgow) Field Regiment, Royal Artillery =

131st (Lowland – City of Glasgow) Field Regiment, RA
- Royal Artillery cap badge
- Active: 31 March 1939–9 January 1946
- Country: United Kingdom
- Branch: Territorial Army
- Role: Field artillery
- Size: 2–3 Batteries
- Part of: 15th (Scottish) Infantry Division
- Garrison/HQ: Glasgow
- Engagements: Operation Epsom; Operation Greenline; Operation Bluecoat; Seine crossing Operation Market Garden; Operation Pheasant; Defence of Asten; Operation Veritable; Operation Plunder; Operation Enterprise

131st (Lowland – City of Glasgow) Field Regiment was a Royal Artillery (RA) unit of Britain's part-time Territorial Army (TA) created just before World War II. It was formed from part of 80th (Lowland – City of Glasgow) Field Regiment, Royal Artillery, itself descended from the 1st Lanarkshire Artillery Volunteers, first raised in Glasgow, Scotland in 1859. After serving in home defence the regiment fought in Normandy (Operation Overlord) and through the campaign in North West Europe, distinguishing itself in the action at Asten. It was disbanded after the end of the war.

== Mobilisation ==
The TA was doubled in size after the Munich Crisis of 1938, and most regiments split to form duplicates. Part of the reorganisation was that field artillery regiments changed from four six-gun batteries to an establishment of two batteries, each of three four-gun troops. For the 80th (Lowland – City of Glasgow) Fd Rgt this resulted in the following organisation from 31 March 1939:

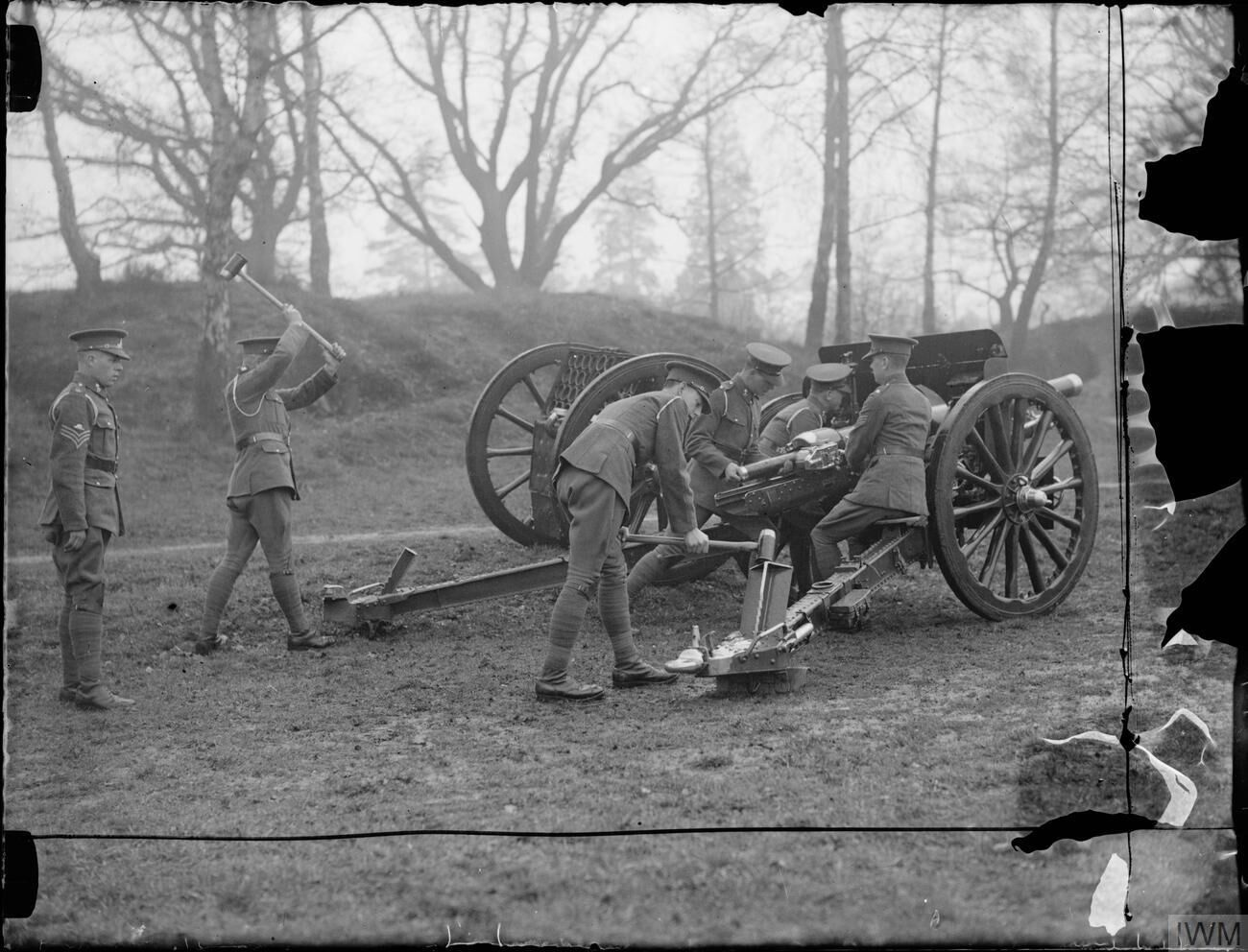
Emplacing an 18-pounder with wooden wheels at the start of World War II.

80th (Lowland – City of Glasgow) Field Regiment, Royal Artillery

- Regimental Headquarters (RHQ) at Glasgow
- 317 (1st City of Glasgow) Field Bty at Glasgow
- 318 (2nd City of Glasgow) Field Bty at Maryhill

131st Field Regiment, Royal Artillery

- RHQ at Glasgow
- 319 (3rd City of Glasgow) Field Bty at Glasgow
- 320 (4th City of Glasgow) Field Bty at Townhead

On the outbreak of World War II in September 1939, 131st Field Regiment mobilised in 15th (Scottish) Infantry Division (the duplicate of the TA's established 52nd (Lowland) Infantry Division).

== World War II ==
=== Home defence ===
Upon mobilisation, 15th (S) Division moved into the Scottish Borders to begin its training, with the artillery at Selkirk and Jedburgh. After three months it returned to winter quarters, which were chosen to meet the defence requirements of the Firth of Clyde and Firth of Forth: in the case of 131st Fd Rgt, this was to billets in the southwestern suburbs of Glasgow. The division marched out to the Borders to resume training in April 1940, with 131st Fd Rgt at Annan, attached to 46th (Highland) Brigade at Dumfries. The division was now one of those assigned to the 'Julius Caesar' defence plan, even though it still had virtually no equipment.

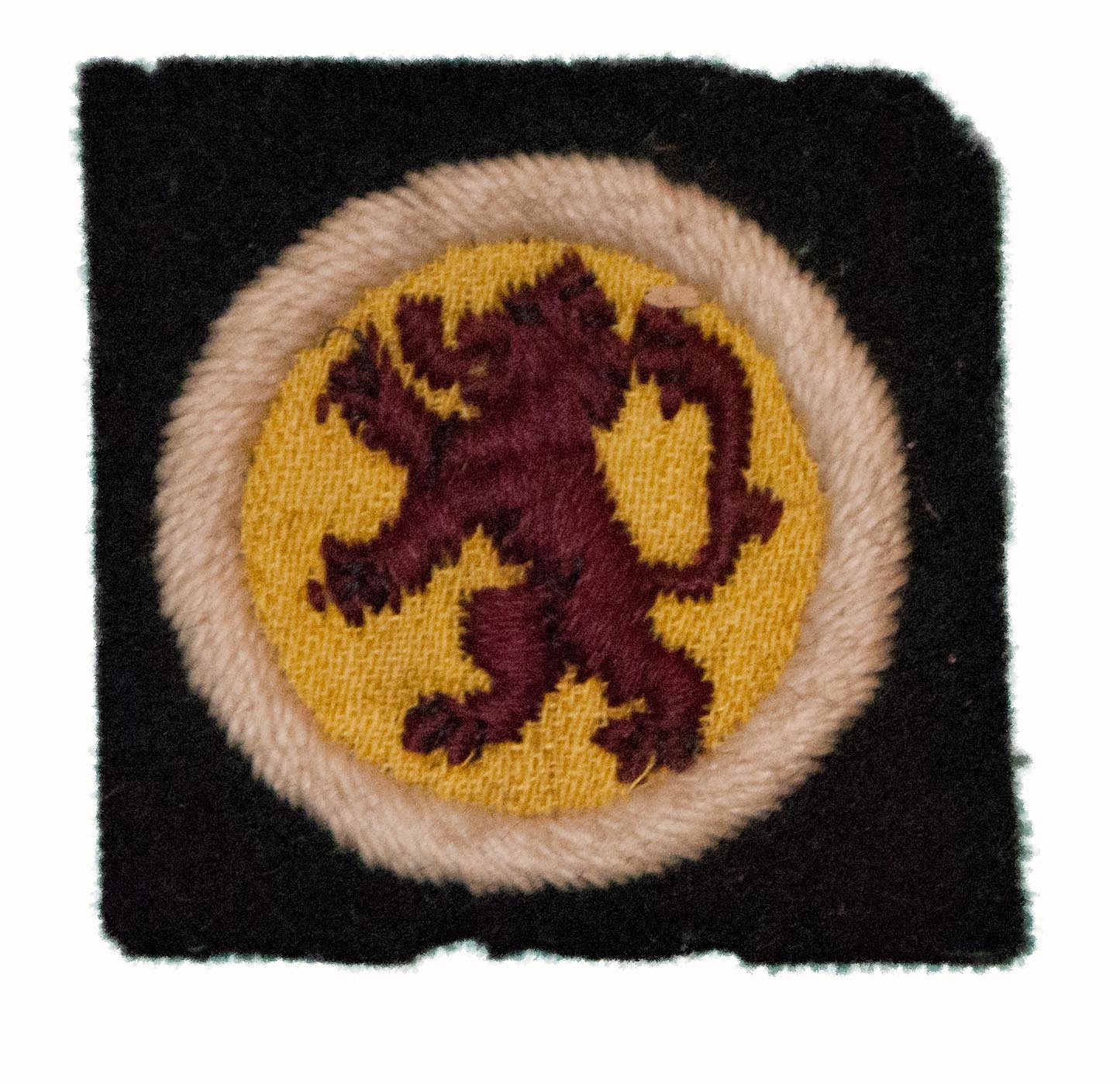
Divisional insignia of 15th (Scottish) Division, personally authorised by King George VI on 31 October 1940.

At the beginning of May the division was suddenly ordered to vacate its camps, which were required to house the troops being evacuated from the failed Norwegian campaign. It moved south to the area of Wiltshire and Berkshire under Southern Command. The German invasion of the Low Countries followed on 10 May, and four days later 15th (S) Division began moving again, this time by successive brigade groups to take up defensive positions on the south-east Essex coast under Eastern Command. 45th Brigade and the divisional troops first moved to Hertford, then from 26 May the complete division was positioned along the Essex coast under the command of XI Corps. The divisional artillery had the task of covering the whole divisional front from Southend-on-Sea to Harwich (40 miles (64 km)) from static positions with a very small number of guns. On 31 May the three field artillery regiments between them had six 18-pounder guns and twelve 4.5-inch howitzers, all of World War I vintage. After the Dunkirk evacuation this was the front line of Britain's defences.

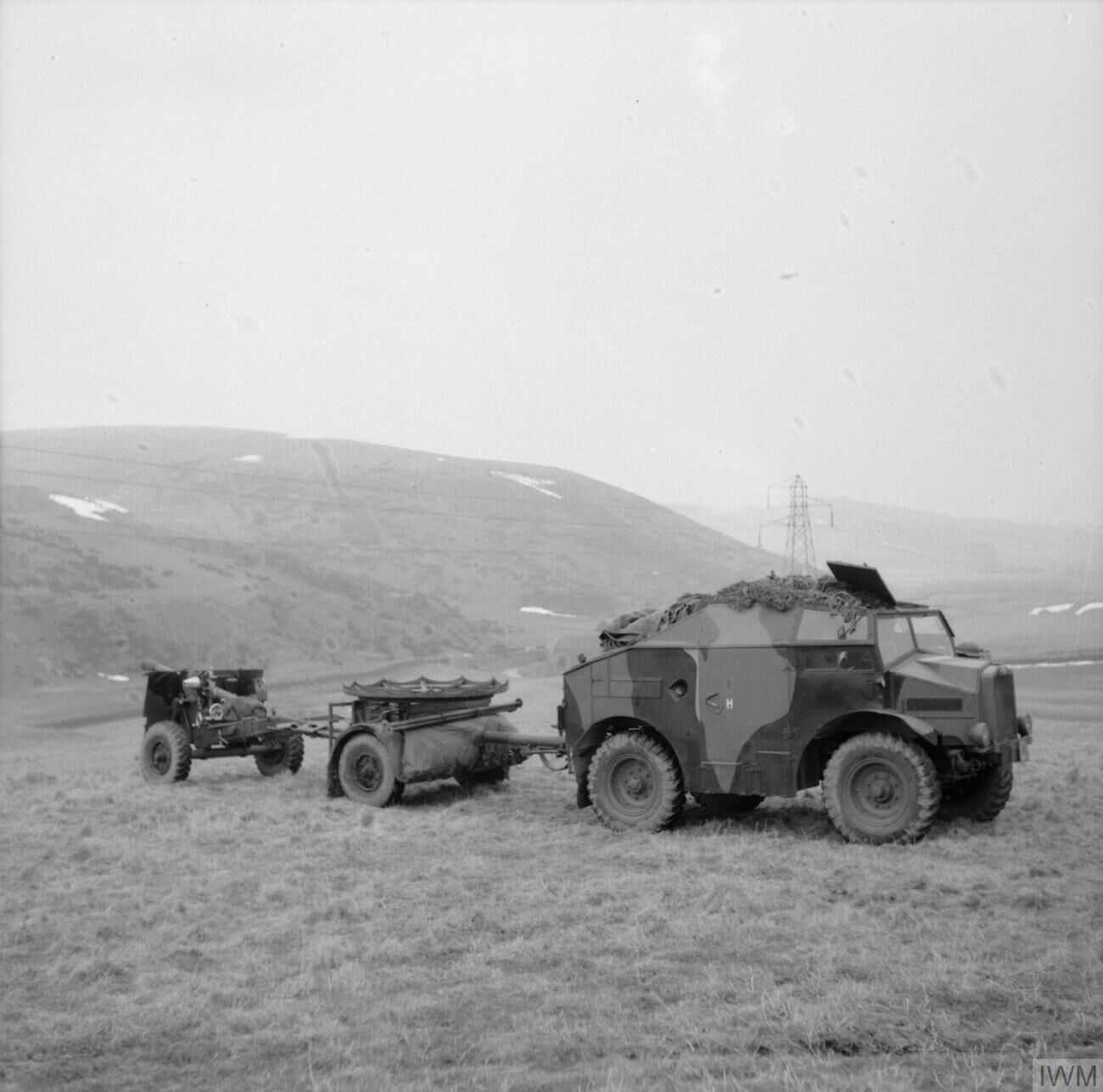
Quad tractor and 25-pounder gun on exercise in the UK, 1941.

The division remained in its positions through the autumn and into the winter of 1940-41. As the danger of invasion receded, training was stepped up with divisional exercises. In February 1941 the division moved north to take over defence of the Suffolk coast. By now 131st Fd Rgt possessed four modern Mk II 25-pounder guns, but it was not until September that the whole divisional artillery was equipped with 25-pdrs and Quad gun tractors. One of the lessons learned from the Battle of France was that the two-battery organisation did not work: field regiments were intended to support an infantry brigade of three battalions. As a result, they were reorganised into three 8-gun batteries, but it was not until late 1940 that the RA had enough trained battery staffs to carry out the reorganisation. The regiment formed its third battery, 495 Fd Bty, on 27 February 1941, when it was stationed at Martlesham.

In November 1941 15th (S) Division moved to Northumberland under IX Corps, but it was placed on a lower establishment, recognising that it was not going to be deployed overseas in the short term. Instead, it became a feeder of men and units for other formations. 131st Field Rgt was the only field artillery regiment that remained with the division at this time. It was stationed with 46th (H) Bde around Alnwick. The regiment was authorised to use its parent regiment's 'Lowland – City of Glasgow' subtitle on 17 February 1942.

=== Overlord training ===
In March 1943 the division was restored to full establishment, initially as a 'Mixed' division including an armoured brigade, then from September 1943 as a conventional infantry division as part of Second Army in 21st Army Group preparing for the Allied landings in Normandy (Operation Overlord). In that month, 15th (S) Division moved from Northumberland to a training area in the West Riding of Yorkshire and began a series of training exercises through the winter. 131st Field Rgt was paired with the new 227th (Highland) Bde for training and future operations. In mid-February the whole division participated in a 12-day training exercise (Exercise Eagle) in the Yorkshire Wolds along with the other divisions assigned to VIII Corps. In April 1944 the division moved to its concentration area in Sussex to prepare for embarkation.

=== Normandy ===
The assault formations of 21st Army Group landed on D Day (6 June). Although parts of 15th (S) Division had begun landing on 13 June, the weather deteriorated and some units were not complete until 23 June. The guns then moved up into 'hides' during 24 June before the division was committed to its first action in the Battle of the Odon (Operation Epsom) at 07.30 on 26 June. It attacked on a two-brigade front behind a Creeping barrage fired by 344 divisional and corps field and medium guns. The objective was to force crossings of the Rivers Orne and Odon. The infantry fought their way into the villages of Cheux and St Manvieu but the Odon bridges were still 2 miles (3.2 km) away at the end of the first day. The following day the Scots captured the vital bridge over the Odon, by the end of which 15th (S) Division had created a deep salient into the German positions (known as 'Scottish Corridor') without reaching the Orne. Over following days the Germans made repeated attempts to overwhelm the corridor. Ultimately the Germans could not take the pounding from concentrated Allied firepower and had to stop their attacks. However, Operation Epsom caused a quarter of all the casualties suffered by 15th (S) Division in the North West Europe campaign.

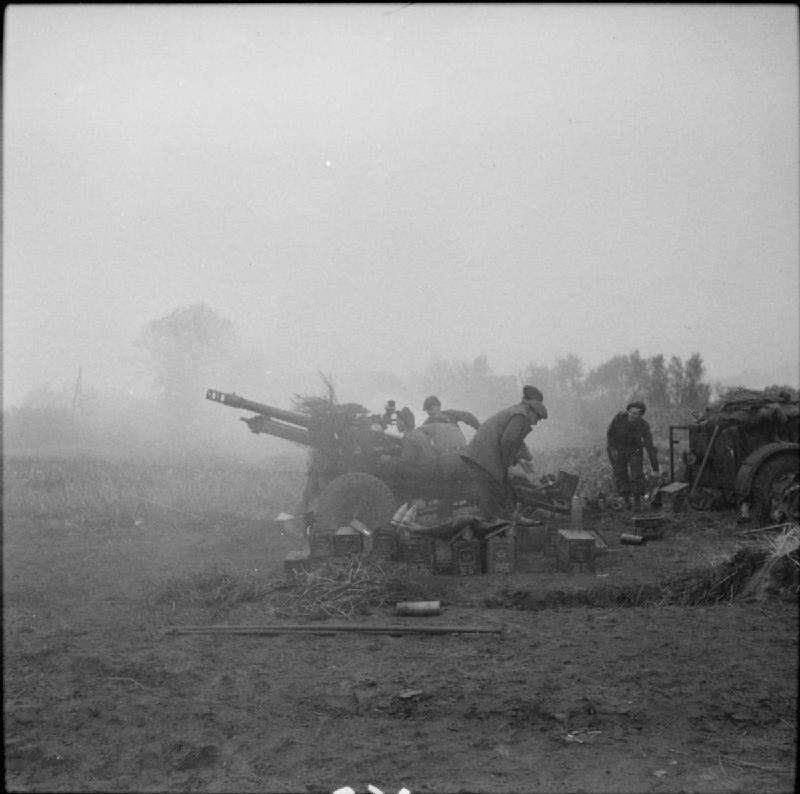
25-pounders in action in North West Europe, 1944.

For the next month the division fought its way slowly through the Bocage country, capturing Éterville, retaking Gavrus and advancing to Évrecy in Operations Jupiter and Greenline. During the latter operation a German counter-attack with tanks and infantry threatened Battalion HQ of 2nd Battalion, Gordon Highlanders: while the battalion's anti-tank gun platoon knocked out the tanks at point-blank range, 131st Fd Rgt dispersed the infantry.

The division was then quickly switched west for Operation Bluecoat, the attack on Caumont-sur-Orne, beginning on 30 July. This allowed the artillery little time to plan, and to preserve secrecy there was no preliminary bombardment. 15th (Scottish) Division's artillery, including 131st Fd Rgt married up with 227th (H) Bde, were tasked with firing concentrations in support of the attacking troops in Phase I. The field regiments also had observation posts (OPs) in tanks with the supporting 6th Guards Tank Brigade. For Phase II a 110 minute slow barrage was fired. Three-quarters of the 25-pdr rounds were fuzed to Air burst, which was effective over bocage and allowed the tanks to keep close to the barrage in safety. The division's objective was Point 309 ('Quarry Hill') to protect the flank of the attack. Launched on 30 July the attack made good progress, with 15th (S) Division getting onto the Estry and Perrier Ridges to support the advancing armour. Heavy fighting ensued for several days, 15th (S) Division supporting 43rd (Wessex) Division's seizure of Mont Pinçon on 6 August. On 13 August the Germans began to withdraw and 15th (S) Division was relieved and went to rest.

=== Low Countries ===
After its rest, the regiment joined XII Corps and was engaged in rapid movements as 21st Army Group advanced to the River Seine. 15th (S) Division made an assault crossing of the river against limited opposition, and the Royal Engineers soon erected bridges to allow the supporting units to cross. The division pressed on to Les Andelys, finding the Germans already gone. The armoured divisions then passed through, and after four days 15th (S) Division followed them into Belgium, taking over a small bridgehead across the Albert Canal near Geel. On 13 September the division's task was to push on to the Junction Canal: 227th (H) Bde came into the bridgehead and began extending it northeastwards. 131st Field Rgt was following the advanced guard of 10th Battalion Highland Light Infantry (HLI) when a call for fire came at 16.00. The leading battery, 319, unlimbered and got its first round off in two minutes. The whole regiment was ready, with its survey done, within a quarter of an hour, and was soon responding to divisional calls to support the other brigades. By the time 10th HLI got to Mol the Germans had gone and blown the canal bridge beyond.

On the night of 14/15 September the division struggled to seize a bridgehead over the canal at Aart and then defend it against a succession of counter-attacks. Ammunition shortage restricted the divisional artillery to urgent defensive fire (DF) tasks only. One attack on the evening of 16 September was held off by small arms fire, while the guns hit the enemy troops in the rear, then caught another counter-attack as it was forming up. The fire was directed by an OP high in a factory building, manned first by 181st Fd Rgt, later relieved by 131st Fd Rgt. Operation Market Garden was launched on 17 September, with XXX Corps breaking out of its own canal bridgehead. Given the fierce resistance at Aart, XII Corps HQ decided to cross elsewhere, while 15th (S) Division merely improved its position and bridged the Junction Canal. The divisional artillery continued its DF tasks to break up counter-attacks.

15th (Scottish) Division next went into action at Best on 21 September in an attempt to widen XXX Corps' narrow corridor. The divisional artillery OP parties took up position in the Bata Shoe Factory. On 26 September the division put in a set-piece attack on the cement factory with 46th (H) Bde, supported by the whole of the divisional artillery. Although Operation Market Garden had ended in failure, fighting continued round Best until 1 October, when the division was finally relieved for rest.

The division returned to the line on 19 October for Operation Pheasant to support 51st (Highland) Division, which was attacking 's-Hertogenbosch. After 15th (Scottish) liberated Tilburg on 28 October, the Germans put in a heavy counter-attack against 7th US Armored Division at Asten. 131st Field Rgt was immediately sent to help, driving through Asten in moonlight and going straight into action with a fireplan drawn up by 7th US Armored Divisional Artillery, directed by an OP of 25th Fd Rgt, RA, which was already in action. The rest of 227th (H) Bde arrived during the night to take up defensive positions at Asten. 131st and 25th Field Rgts therefore found themselves in action on the Asten–Meijel road a good 1.5 miles (2.4 km) in front of their own infantry, with ammunition running short and ranges to the advancing Germans getting shorter. The two regiments prepared for local defence, supported by an anti-tank troop that had just arrived. By 11.00 131st Fd Rgt was down to about 10 rounds per gun and the last of the US infantry in front were passing through their position. 25th Field Rgt was able to supply some ammunition, and the two regiments held off the enemy advance up the Asten–Meijel by fire alone until 46th (H) Bde arrived at dusk. At times the two field regiments had been engaging four or five targets simultaneously, a total of over 100 in the day, at an expenditure of 400 rounds per gun. (Note: 25 Field Bty of 25th Fd Rgt was later awarded the Honour Title 'Asten' for this epic stand, but Honour Titles are only awarded to Regular Army units and as TA units 131st Fd Rgt and its batteries were not similarly recognised. 25 Field Bty was also awarded a US Presidential Unit Citation.) 15th (Scottish) Division remained at Meijel under heavy German artillery fire for several weeks, but its own barrage when advancing towards the town was also effective. The Germans withdrew on 18 November, and the division followed up in bad weather. It was relieved on 27–28 November.

On 3 December the Division carried out a textbook attack on Blerick to eliminate the remaining German bridgehead on the River Maas, opposite Venlo. It employed a single brigade, 44th (Lowland), backed by Second Army's's superior resources in airpower, engineering and artillery to overcome formidable minefields, anti-tank ditches and fortifications. The divisional artillery was reinforced with no less than three Army Groups Royal Artillery (AGRAs), making a total of over 400 guns, including super-heavies. The artillery programme began at 05.25, when 'Blerick was blotted out by smoke and dust and sheets of flame'. The breaching operation started at 07.25 and was a complete success, with low casualties. 15th (Scottish) Division remained on the line of the Maas for the next seven weeks while Second Army turned to assist US forces to block the German Ardennes Offensive.

=== Rhineland ===
Between 23 and 28 January 1945 15th (S) Division was concentrated at Tilburg to prepare for Operation Veritable to clear the Reichswald between the Maas and the River Rhine. The division was given four objectives, the first and easiest phase (Operation Gilbert) was to close up to the Siegfried Line defences. Advancing on a two-brigade front, the attack was supported by the divisional artillery reinforced by two self-propelled field regiments and a medium regiment. The divisional artillery moved up to its assembly area on the night of 5/6 February, the field regiments taking up positions astride the main road by last light on 7 February. The preliminary bombardment of the enemy defences began at 05.00 on 8 February, and at 07.30 the guns switched to firing smoke screens designed to draw enemy fire against the expected attack. There was then a pause to allow the sound-rangers and flash-spotters to locate the German artillery. The destructive fire was renewed at 07.50, with Counter-battery fire until 10.00 when the barrage began. H Hour for 15 (S) Division was at 10.30 and then the barrage advanced ahead of the infantry in a series of 300 yards (270 m) lifts every 12 minutes; each lift was signalled to the infantry by one gun of each troop firing a round of yellow smoke. By keeping up with the barrage the infantry achieved the first objective successfully, but Operation Sullivan, to breach the Siegfried Line at 21.00, was held up by traffic jams and bad going. By 08.00 the following morning there was still no sign of the battalion due to carry out the attack. It took until the evening of 9/10 February for the division to reach its main objective, the 'Materborn Feature' overlooking the town of Kleve. Over following days it made slow progress through the forest against increasing German artillery. Conditions were so bad that 25-pdr ammunition had to be delivered to the guns by amphibious vehicles until a circuitous road was opened up. Two brigades of the division were relieved on 15 February, but 46th (H) Bde continued attacking Moyland Castle until 17 February. The division then took part in Operation Blockbuster to capture Goch. It was finally relieved on 25–26 February.

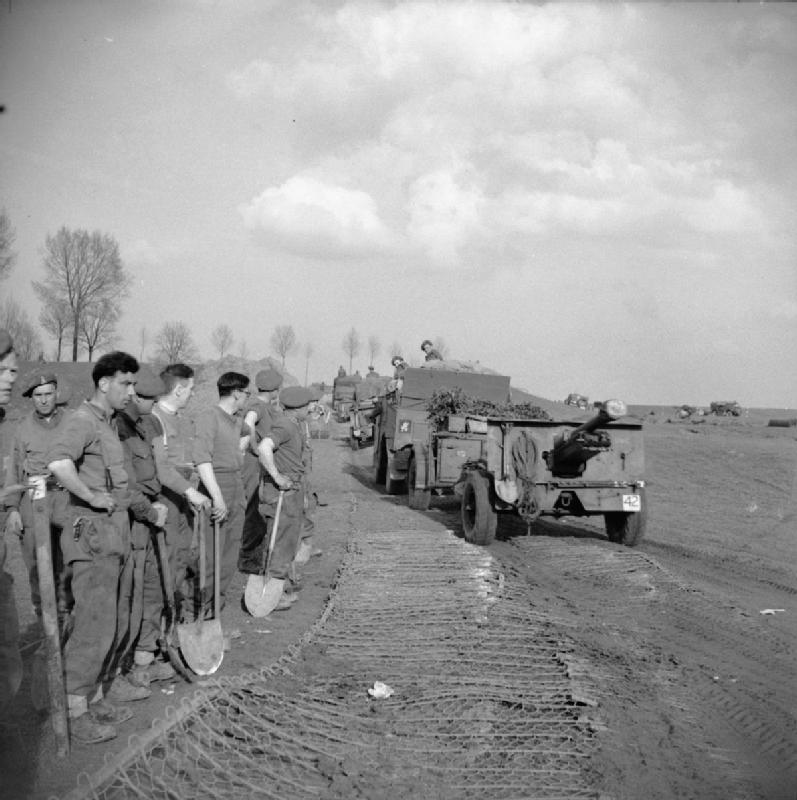
25-pounders moving up to cross the Rhine, March 1945.

=== Rhine crossing ===
In early March 1945, 15th (S) Division was withdrawn to Belgium to begin training for the assault crossing of the River Rhine (Operation Plunder). Its role was to establish a two-brigade bridgehead at Xanten in Operation Torchlight covered by an intense artillery bombardment. Establishing gun positions and dumping of ammunition close up to the river was carried out behind a massive smokescreen, and the guns moved in on the night of 22 March. The bombardment for XXX Corps' crossing began at 17.00 on 23 March, followed an hour later by the 700 guns of XII Corps supporting 15th (S) Division. The preparation began with CB fire, then at 11.30 the full 'softening' bombardment began. 44th (L) Brigade's crossing went off successfully and it made good progress on the far bank; 227th (H) Bde had more difficulties, with units landing out of position. 10th HLI landing near Wolffskath was held up by fire from Bettenhof about 1,000 yards (910 m) inland. The radio with the artillery forward observation officer (FOO) was out of action, but his instructions were passed via an infantry set and brought down a concentration on Bettenhof that allowed the battalion to advance and take the village. However, battalion HQ of 10th HLI had been forced back into Wolffskath and the complete OP party of 131st Fd Rgt was ambushed and wiped out. Nevertheless, the brigade established itself on the far bank, protected by DF tasks fired by the artillery. The artillery fell silent just before 10.00 on 24 March as the aircraft carrying XVIII Airborne Corps went over to drop their troops behind the German defenders in Operation Varsity. During the rest of the day the artillery fired DF tasks to support the bridgehead, which was expanded by 46th (H) Bde, and on 25 March the divisional field regiments began crossing the river on rafts.

=== Elbe crossing ===
After completing mopping up operations the division was pulled out of action on 29 March and went into billets in German houses. On 3 April it was on the move again, to catch up with the fighting and it took the lead again on 10 April. On 14 April 227th (H) Bde was advancing on Uelzen, during which there was confused fighting with German battle groups. 10th HLI in the lead had its transport shot up by a flak site and in the following action the accompanying section of 131st Fd Rgt engaged the enemy over open sights. There was bitter fighting round Uelzen until 18 April, by which time the town was surrounded and the defenders began to surrender. 15th (S) Division then drove on to reach the River Elbe on 20 April. Here it halted to prepare for the assault crossing. The CB bombardment began at midnight on 28 April, and the softening bombardment at 00.50. The sight of this bombardment playing on the opposite cliffs under the artificial moonlight provided by searchlights was described as 'awe-inspiring'. The amphibious vehicles began crossing at 02.00, when the barrage lifted from the shoreline to the top of the cliff. By 08.00 the assaulting battalions had cleared the riverside villages and were advancing over the plateau behind. Next day the division drove off the last counter-attack of the campaign, and the divisional artillery began crossing the river. The division continued to advance through the Sachsenwald towards Hamburg, which surrendered before the division reached it. On 4 May the division was moving in the direction of Lübeck when the German surrender at Lüneburg Heath was signed.

After some months of occupation duties in Germany, 131st (Lowland – City of Glasgow) Field Regiment passed into suspended animation on 9 January 1946. It was formally disbanded when the TA was reconstituted on 1 January 1947.

== Commanders ==
The following officers commanded the regiment:

- Lt-Col R.A.P.R. Kidston
- Lt-Col J.M. Hailey
- Lt-Col J.N.D. Taylor, OBE, MC
