= Bergen, Limburg =

Bergen Baerge
- Municipality
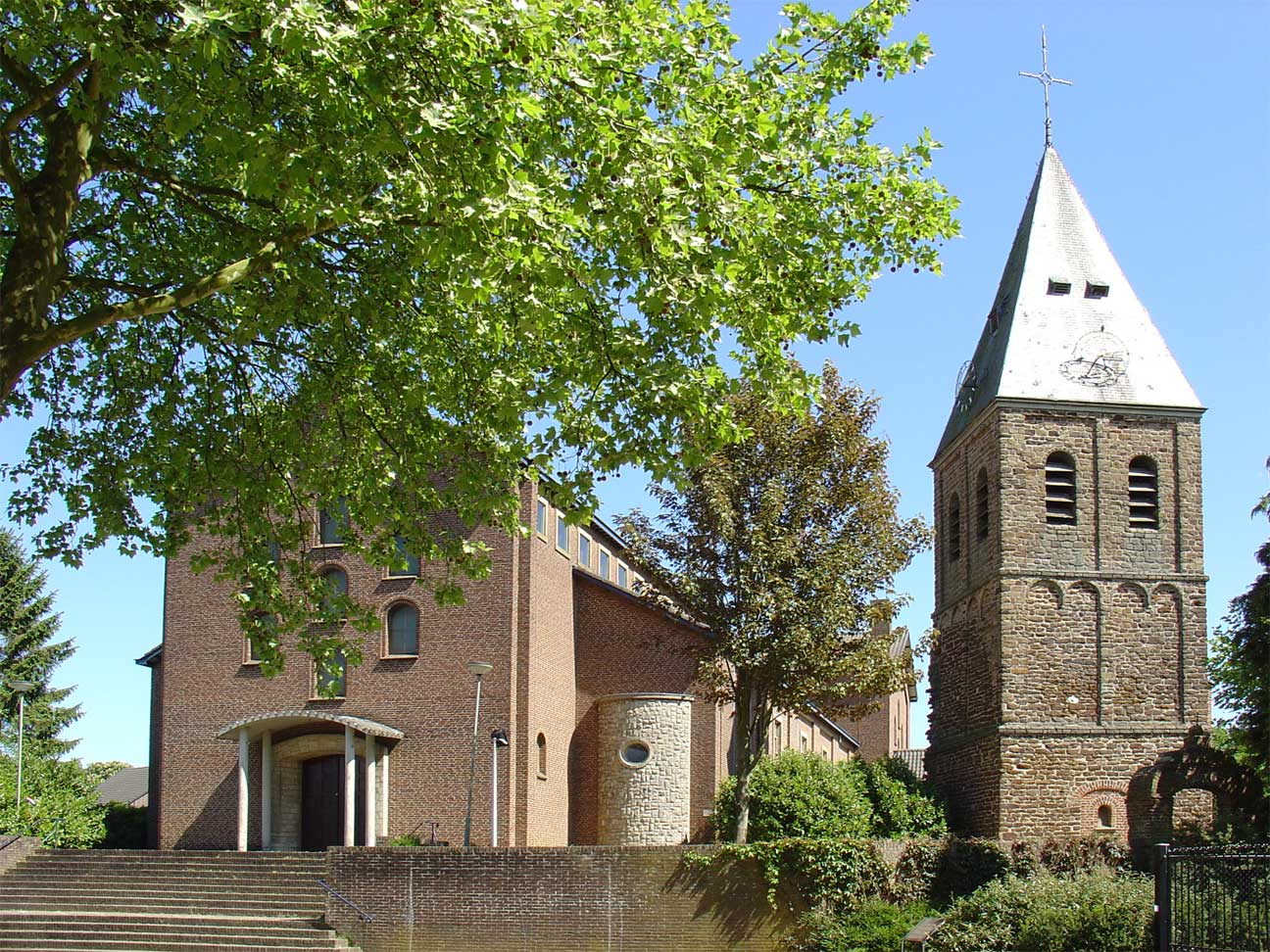
- Church in Afferden

- Flag Coat of arms

- Location in Limburg
- Coordinates: 51°36′N 6°3′E
- Country: Netherlands
- Province: Limburg

Government
  - Body: Municipal council
  - Mayor: Michael Rauner

Area
  - Total: 108.50 km^{2} (41.89 sq mi)
  - Land: 103.24 km^{2} (39.86 sq mi)
  - Water: 5.26 km^{2} (2.03 sq mi)
- Elevation: 16 m (52 ft)

Population (January 2021)
  - Total: 13,108
  - Density: 127/km^{2} (330/sq mi)
- Time zone: UTC+1 (CET)
  - Summer (DST): UTC+2 (CEST)
- Postcode: 5850–5856
- Area code: 0478, 0485
- Website: www.bergen.nl

Bergen (Dutch: [ˈbɛrɣə(n)]; Limburgish: Baerge [ˈbɛːʀ(ə)ɣə]) is a municipality and village in the province of Limburg in the southeastern Netherlands. It is both on the national border with Germany and provincial border with North Brabant. The largest town and administrative centre is Nieuw-Bergen.

== Population centres ==
- Bergen
- Afferden
- Aijen
- Bleijenbeek
- Nieuw-Bergen
- Siebengewald
- Well
- Wellerlooi

== The village of Bergen ==
The village of Bergen lies about 28 km north of Venlo, close to the river Meuse. Although the municipality is named after this village, the municipal hall is located in the town of Nieuw-Bergen, the largest settlement in the municipality. It is located near the German border, approximately 5 miles from Nieuw-Bergen, with Weeze Airport also just a short distance away.

In 2001, Bergen had 304 inhabitants. The built-up area of the village was 0.09 km², and contained 109 residences.

=== Topography ===
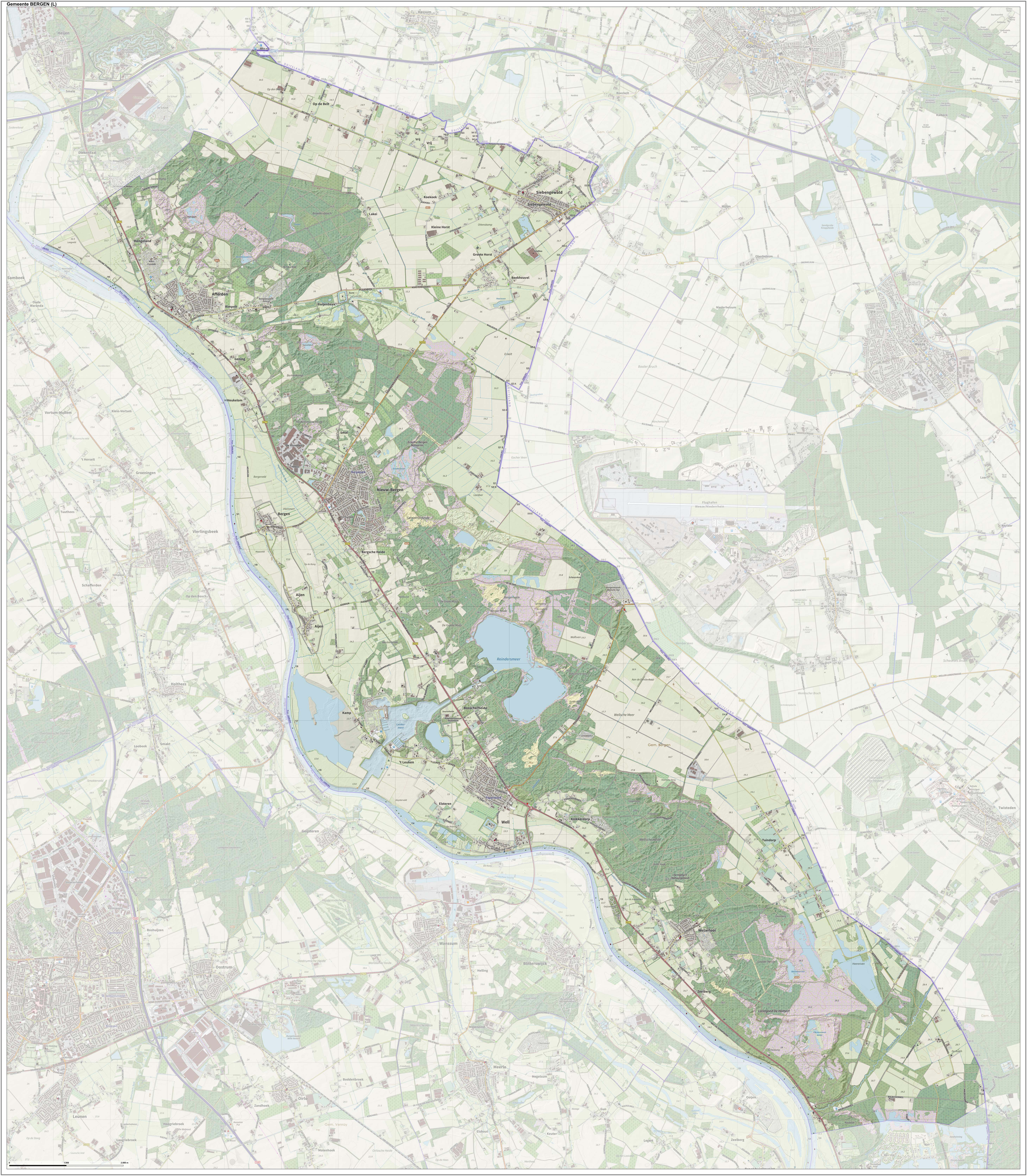

Gem-BergenL-OpenTopo

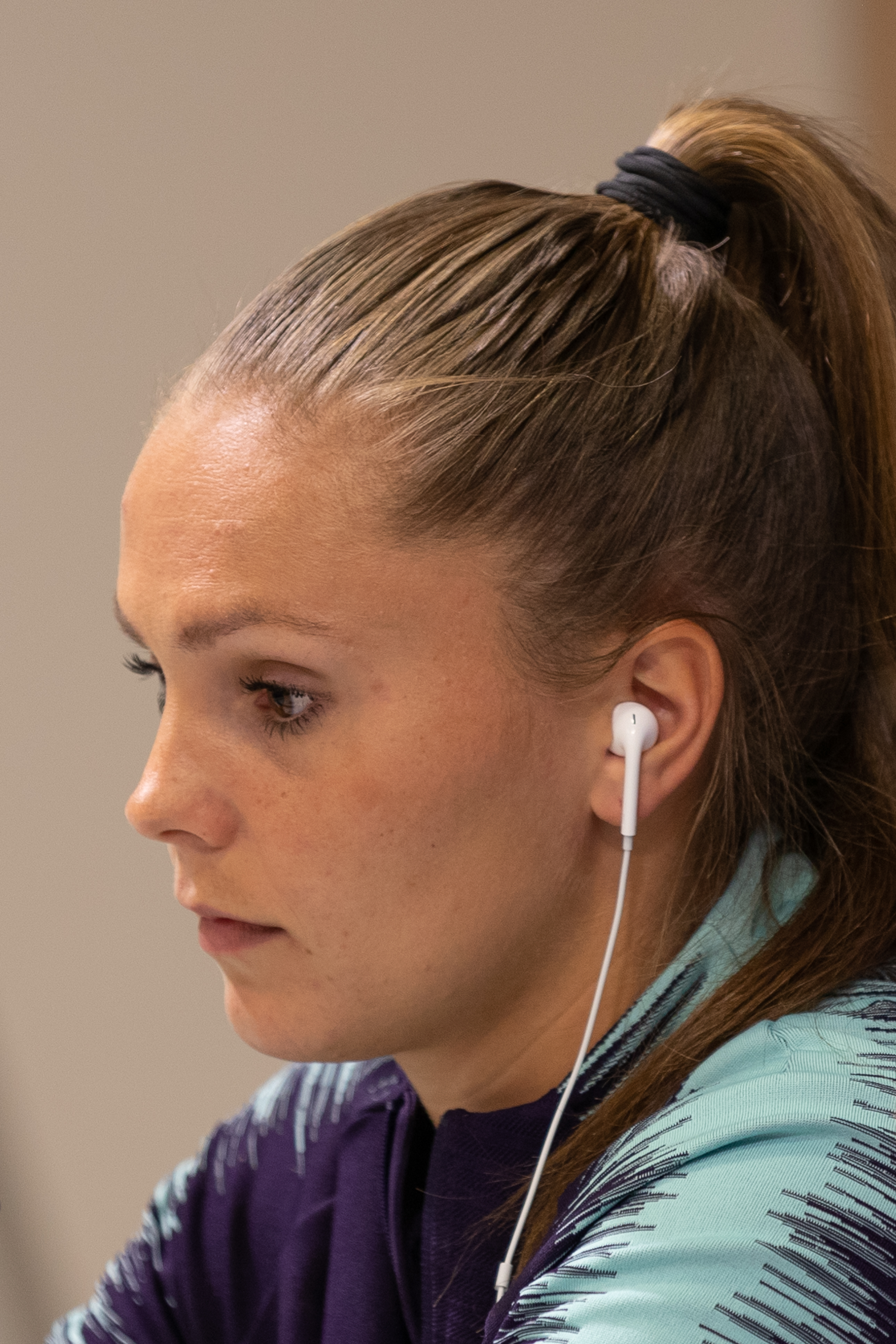
Lieke Martens, 2019

== Notable people ==
- Klaas de Groot (1940 in Bergen – 2024) Emeritus Professor at the University of Twente, did research and development of bioceramics
- Theo Nikkessen (born 1941 in Siebengewald) a retired Dutch amateur track cyclist, competed at the 1960 Summer Olympics
- Rob Mulders (1967 in Well – 1998) a Dutch road racing cyclist
- Lieke Martens (born 1992 in Bergen) a Dutch footballer who plays for Paris Saint Germain (PSG), UEFA Women's Player of the Year in 2017 and FIFA Women's Player of The Year

== Gallery ==
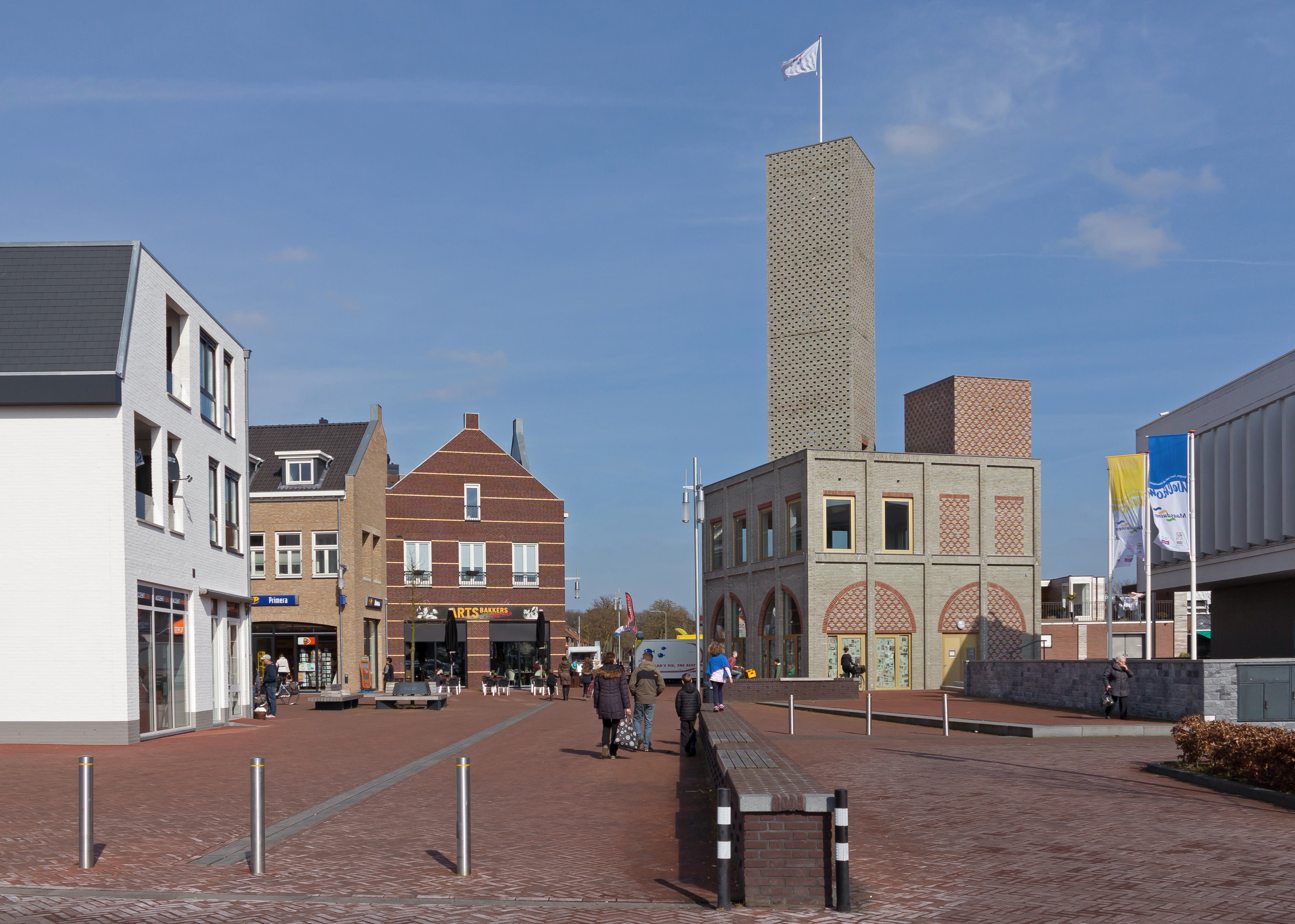
Nieuw-Bergen, markant torengebouw op het Raadhuisplein

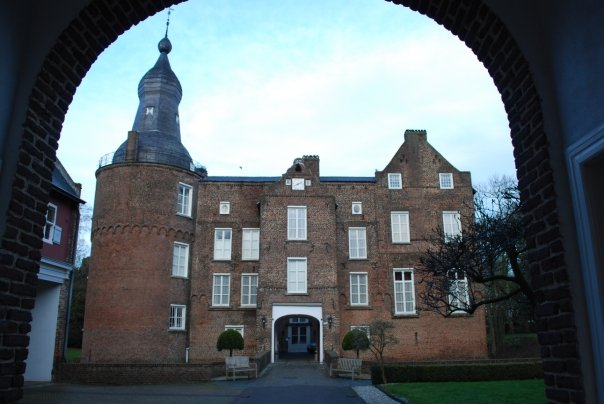
Under the arch of the Voorburcht of Kasteel Well

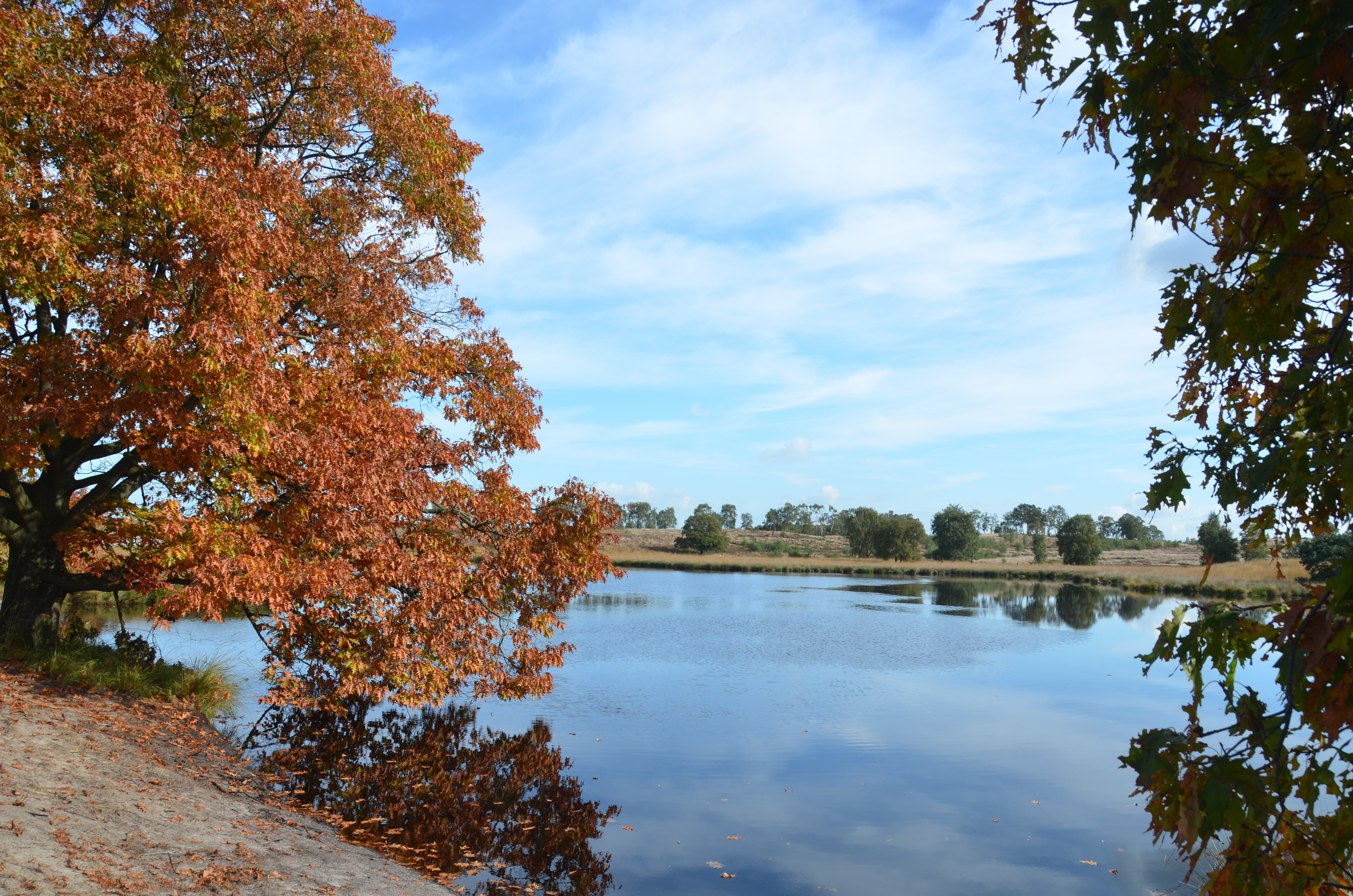
Nature Park, Maasduinen
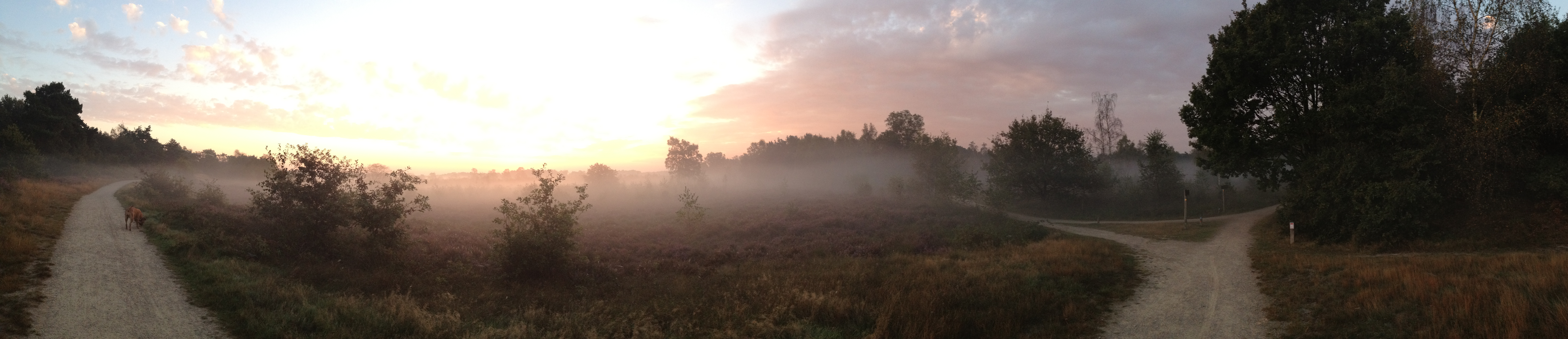
Bergen, Netherlands - panoramio
