= Aijen =

- Hamlet
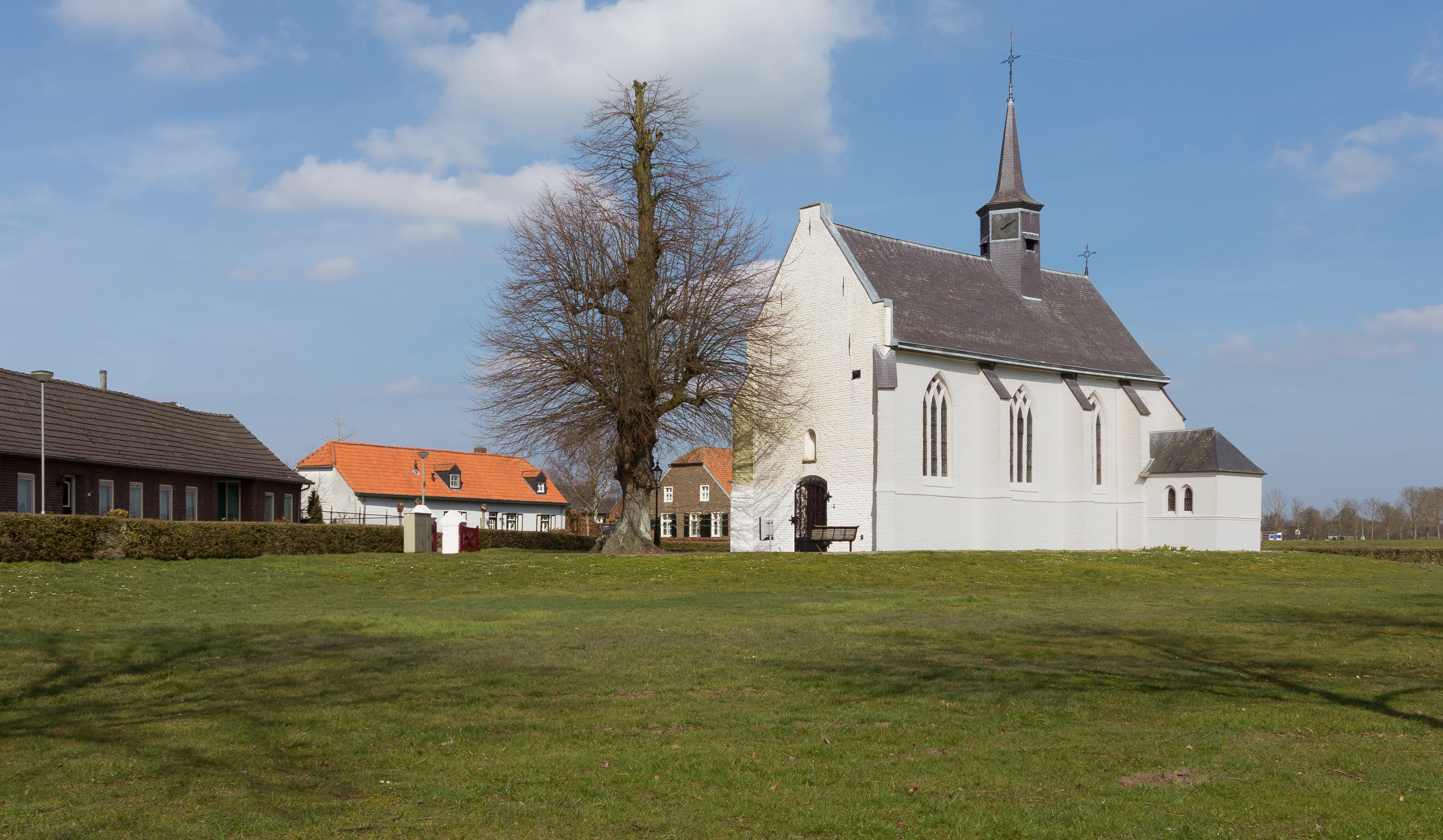
- Sint Antoniuskapel, Aijen

- Location in the Netherlands Location in the province of Limburg in the Netherlands
- Coordinates: 51°35′N 6°02′E
- Country: Netherlands
- Province: Limburg
- Municipality: Bergen, Limburg

Area
  - Total: 2.63 km^{2} (1.02 sq mi)
- Elevation: 14 m (46 ft)

Population (2021)
  - Total: 2,370
  - Density: 901/km^{2} (2,330/sq mi)
- Time zone: UTC+1 (CET)
  - Summer (DST): UTC+2 (CEST)
- Postal code: 5854
- Dialing code: 0485

Aijen (Dutch pronunciation: [ˈaːi.ə(n)]; Limburgish: Äöje [ˈœːjə]) is a hamlet in the municipality of Bergen in the province of Limburg, the Netherlands.

The village was first mentioned in 1336 as Oyen, and means "land on a stream". Aijen was home to 257 people in 1840.

Between 1533 until 1965, there was a pedestrian ferry across the Maas to Maashees. Aijen does not have a church, but has a chapel from the 16th or 17th century, and it was the religious building in the municipality of Bergen which survived undamaged.
