= Siebengewald =

- Village
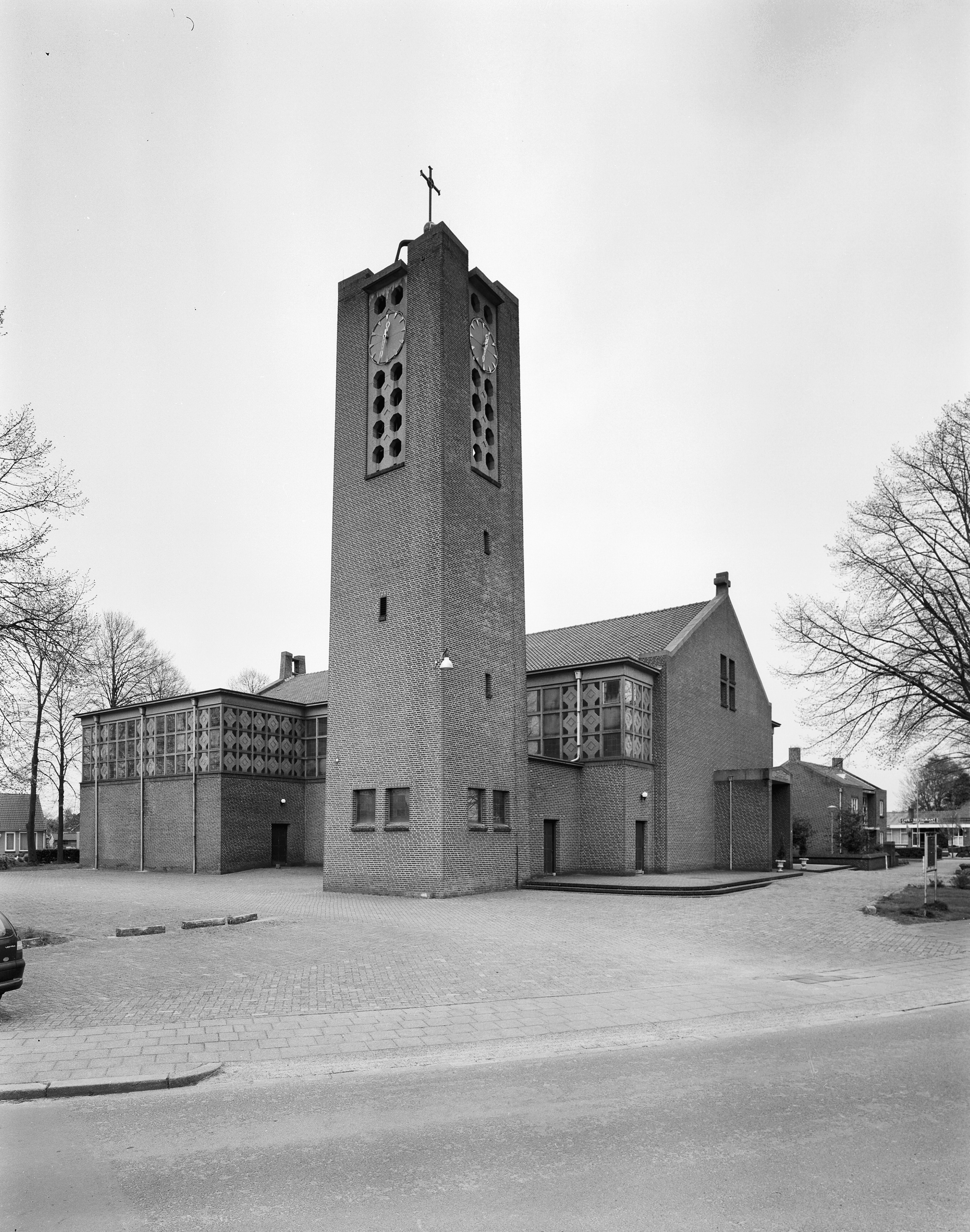
- Church in Siebengewald

- Location in the Netherlands Location in the province of Limburg in the Netherlands
- Coordinates: 51°39′N 6°06′E
- Country: Netherlands
- Province: Limburg
- Municipality: Bergen, Limburg

Area
  - Total: 14.99 km^{2} (5.79 sq mi)
- Elevation: 16 m (52 ft)

Population (2021)
  - Total: 2,055
  - Density: 137.1/km^{2} (355.1/sq mi)
- Time zone: UTC+1 (CET)
  - Summer (DST): UTC+2 (CEST)
- Postal code: 5853
- Dialing code: 0485

Siebengewald is a village in the municipality of Bergen, in the upper northern part of the province of Limburg, the Netherlands. It is located 27 km southeast of Nijmegen, near the German border.

The village was mentioned in 1326 as "zeuenghe waet", and means "seven parties who can use a common forest". Siebengewald developed in the Late Middle Ages, and became part of the Kingdom of the Netherlands in 1818. Siebengewald was home to 293 people in 1840. In 1863, a parish was established.

Siebengewald was severely damaged in 1945. The Catholic St Josephkerk was built between 1955 and 1956 and has a free standing tower. The village did not have street names until 1955, and the houses were marked with a number starting with the letter C.

== Notable people ==
- Jaap Kersten (born 1934), former professional racing cyclist
- Theo Nikkessen (born 1941), amateur track cyclist. Participated at the 1960 Summer Olympics
