= Bleijenbeek Castle =

Dutch castle

- Bleijenbeek, the Netherlands
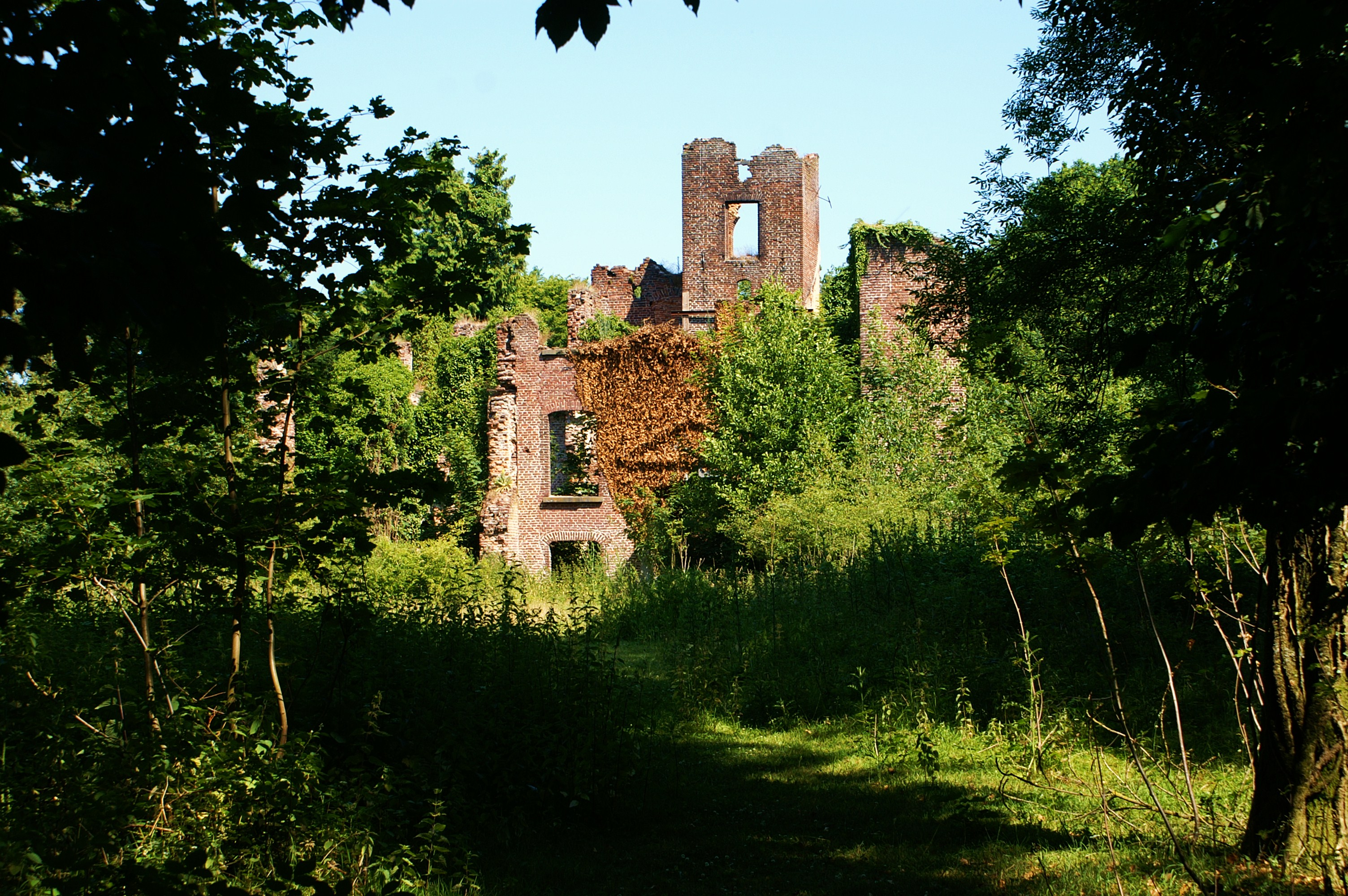
- Bleijenbeek Castle

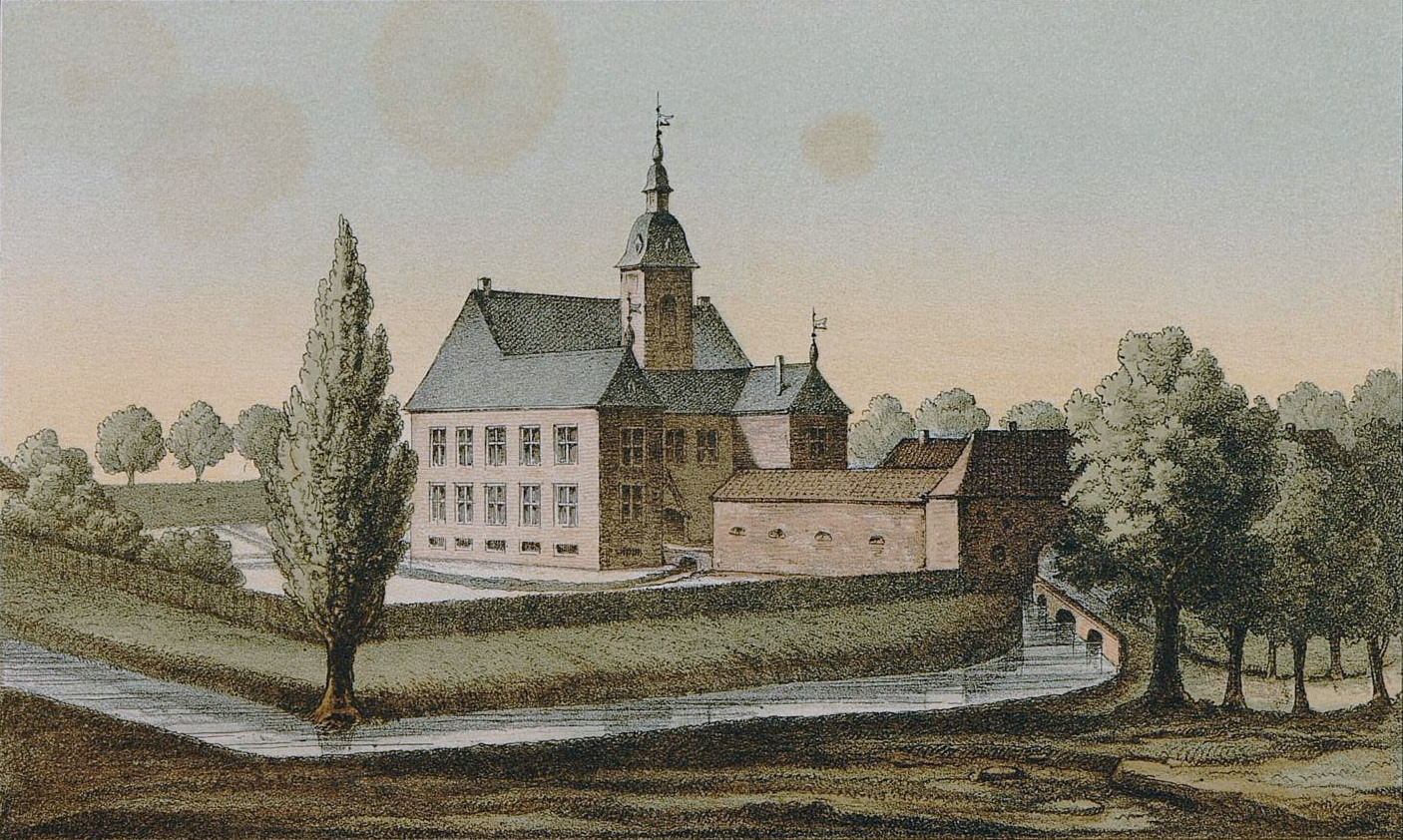
- Bleijenbeek Castle around 1860

Site information
- Type: Castle
- Open to the public: No
- Condition: Ruin, undergoing restoration (as of 2013)

Location
- The Netherlands
- Coordinates: 51.6359°N 6.0527°E

Site history
- Built: 1300
- Materials: Brick
- Demolished: 1944

Bleijenbeek Castle (Dutch: Kasteel Bleijenbeek) is situated in the small hamlet of Bleijenbeek in the Dutch province of Limburg.

According to the 19th-century historian A.J. van der Aa, the castle is known for its numerous sieges by the armies of Guelders and Spain. In 1580, the castle was besieged by the forces of Guelders, but it was defended bravely by the lord of the castle, Marten Schenk. When the Duke of Parma sent cavalry, the besieging army had to retreat. In 1589, Schenk changed sides, and the castle was besieged by Marcus van Rije, the stadtholder of Guelders appointed by the Spanish king; this time, the castle was conquered.

The castle has lain in ruins since the bombardment by the British RAF on 21 and 22 February 1945, during Operation Veritable. It was defended by only 15 Fallschirmjäger who held out against three separate assaults until it was bombed with nine 1,000 pound bombs. Their fierce determination to hold out was reflected by a slogan found in the castle's interior when it was taken. It reads "Sieg oder Sibirien" (Victory or Siberia). In 2009, the property was purchased by the Bleijenbeek Foundation, which intends to restore the remaining structure, moat, and surrounding gardens and provide public access after work is complete. Construction began in the summer of 2012.

== See also ==
- List of Jesuit sites
- List of castles in the Netherlands
