= Oudelande =

- Village
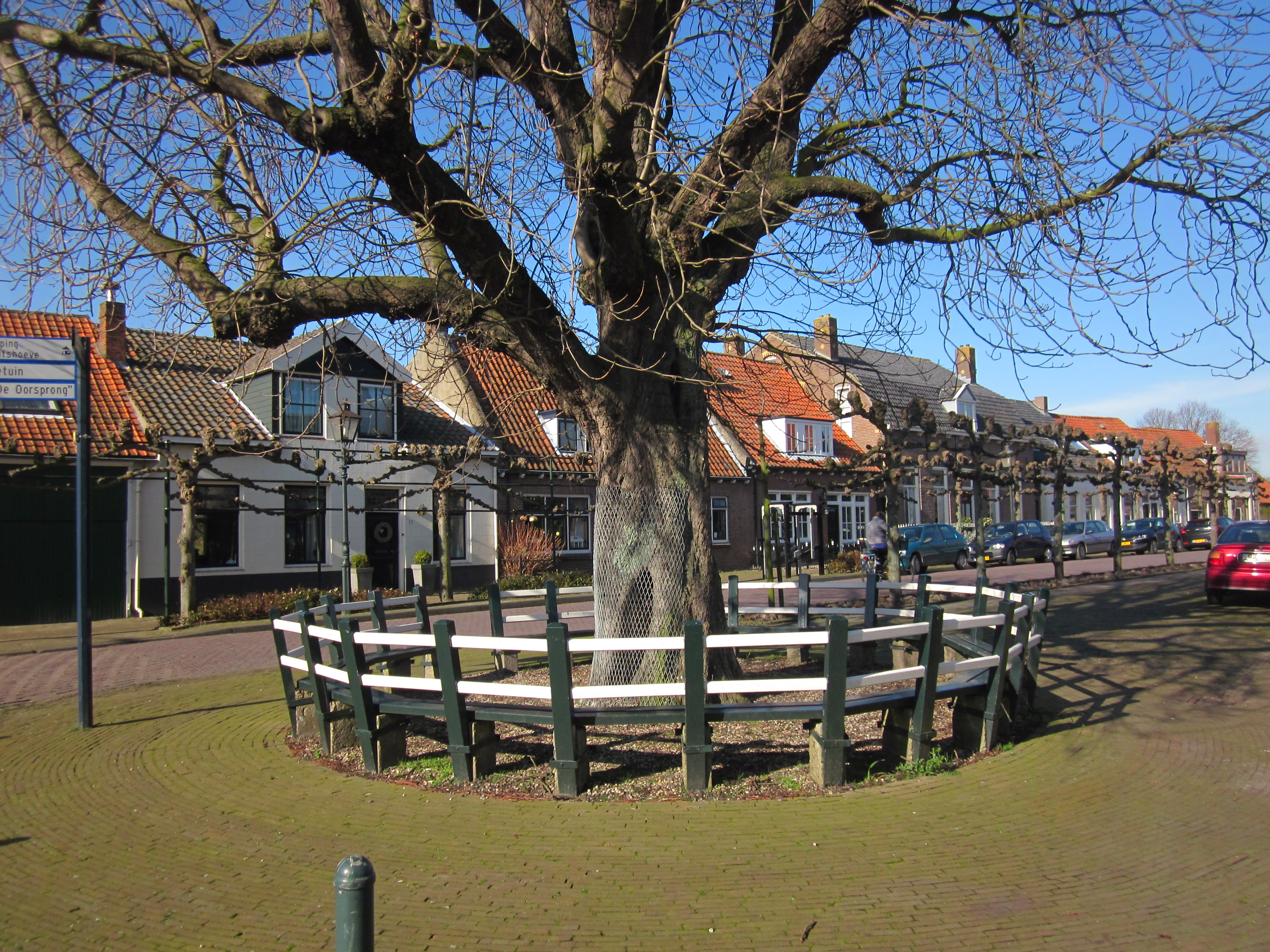
- Village square

- Coat of arms

- Location in the province of Zeeland in the Netherlands Oudelande (Netherlands)
- Coordinates: 51°24′30″N 3°51′13″E
- Country: Netherlands
- Province: Zeeland
- Municipality: Borsele

Area
  - Total: 8.76 km^{2} (3.38 sq mi)
- Elevation: 1.0 m (3.3 ft)

Population (2021)
  - Total: 685
  - Density: 78.2/km^{2} (203/sq mi)
- Time zone: UTC+1 (CET)
  - Summer (DST): UTC+2 (CEST)
- Postal code: 4436
- Dialing code: 0113

Oudelande is a village in the Dutch province of Zeeland. It is a part of the municipality of Borsele, and lies about 19 km southeast of Middelburg.

== History ==
The village was first mentioned in 1312 as "in Badickendorpe ende in Oudelant aen die zuudtzyde", and means "old land", because it was not flooded in 1014. Oudelande is a church village which developed on a ridge which was elevated to a terp (artificial living hill) in the 13th century. The circular structure was not completed on the northern side.

The Dutch Reformed church was originally dedicated to Saint Eligius. The large tower dates from the 14th century. In 1769, a part of the church was demolished and rebuilt.

Oudelande was home to 547 people in 1840. In 1927, a railway station was built on the Goes to Hoedekenskerke railway line. The station closed down in 1934.

The village was severely damaged during the North Sea flood of 1953. Oudelande was a separate municipality until 1970, when it was merged with Borsele.

After running a test for one year, the city council decided to remove all traffic signs in the beginning of 2007 to improve the look of the historical village.

== Gallery ==
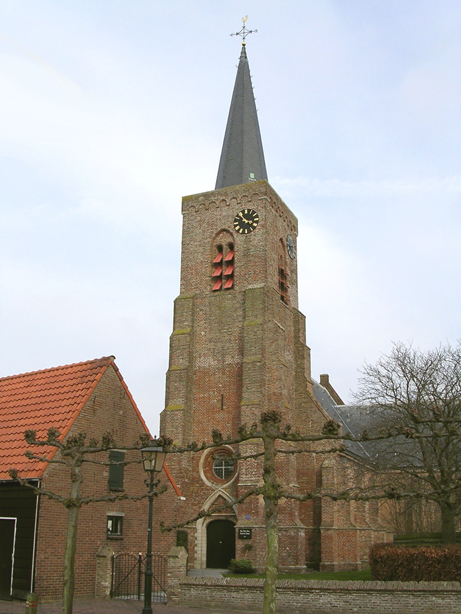
Saint Eligius church in Oudelande

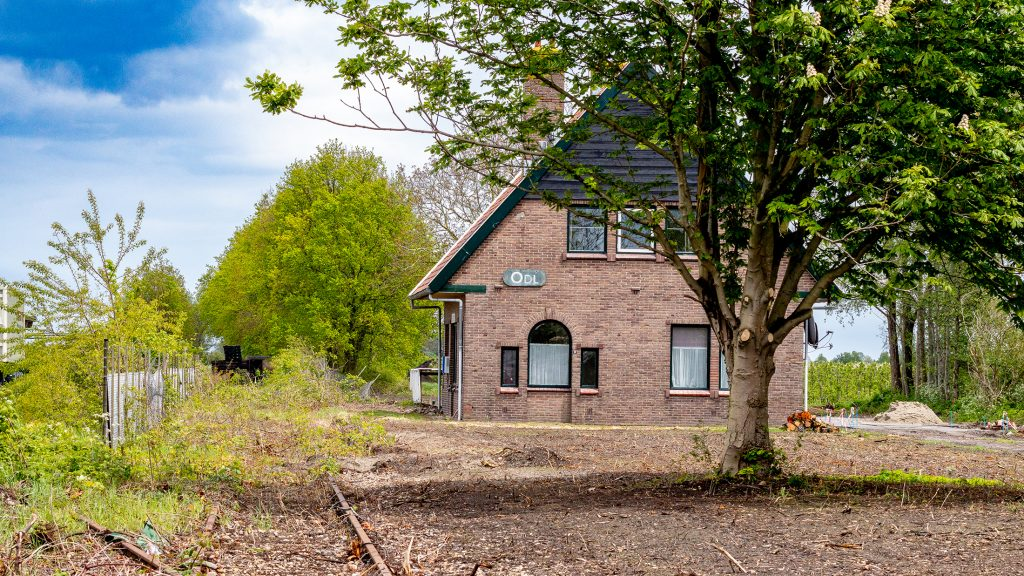
Former railway station

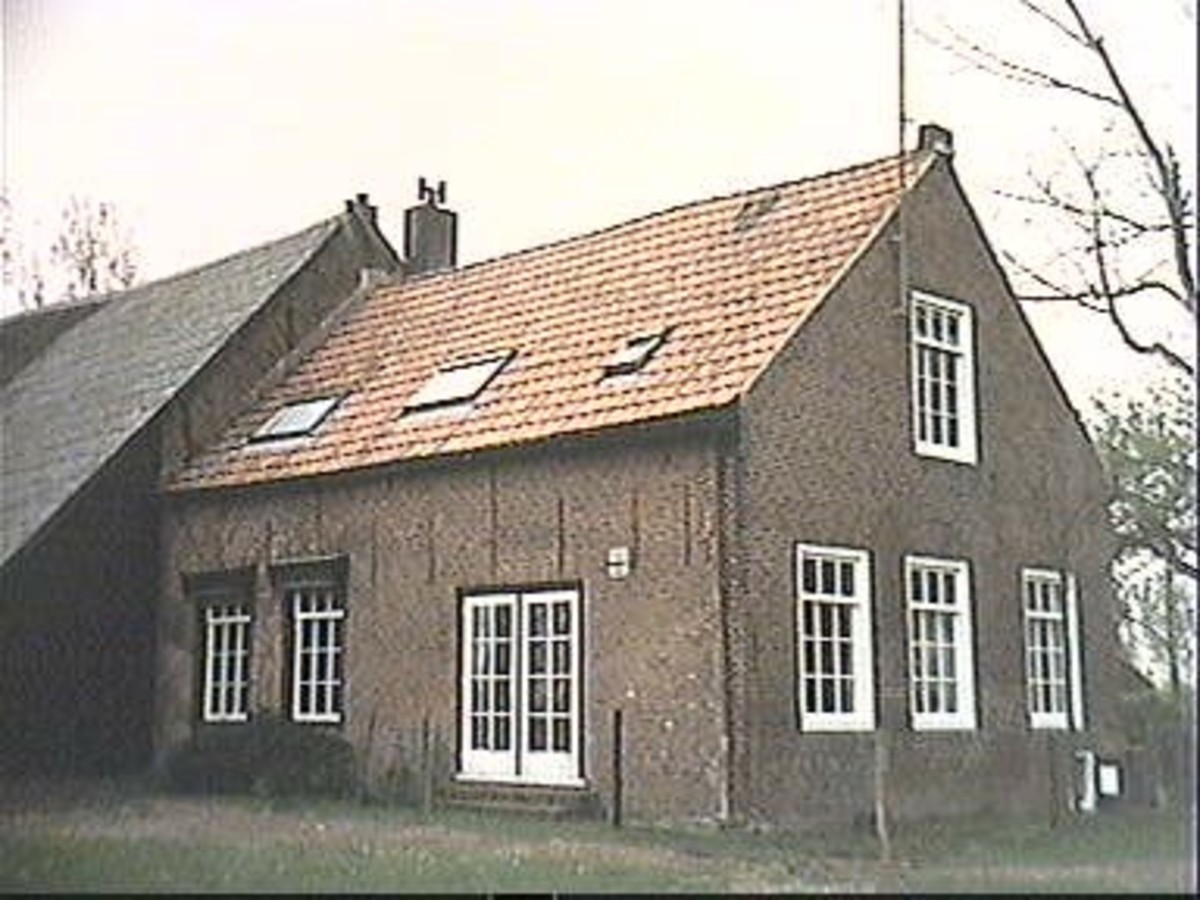
Farm in Oudelande
