= Theo Nikkessen =

Dutch cyclist

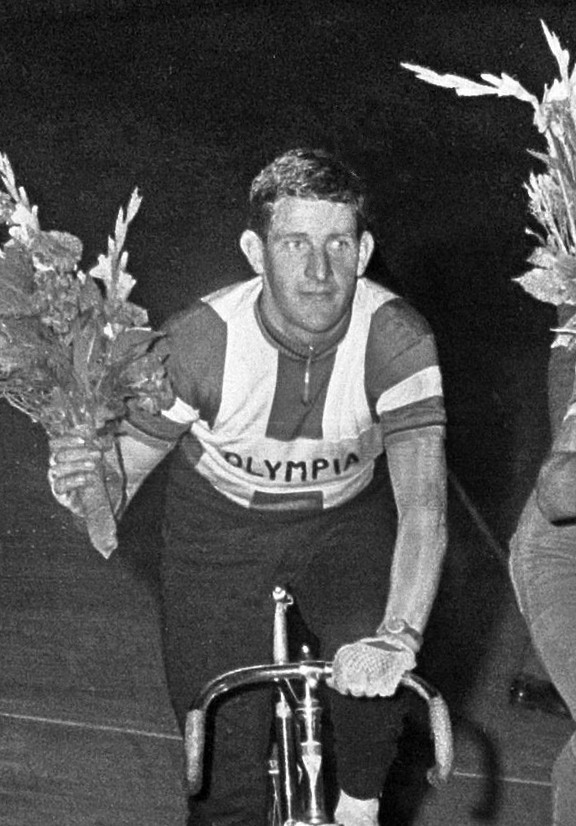
- Theo Nikkessen in 1966

Personal information
- Born: 18 August 1941 (age 85) Siebengewald, the Netherlands
- Height: 1.79 m (5 ft 10 in)
- Weight: 77 kg (170 lb)

Sport
- Sport: Cycling

Theodorus Hubertus Antonius "Theo" Nikkessen (born 18 August 1941) is a retired Dutch amateur track cyclist. He competed at the 1960 Summer Olympics in the 4 km team pursuit and finished in fifth place.

== See also ==
- List of Dutch Olympic cyclists
