= Afferden, Limburg =

Afferden
- Village
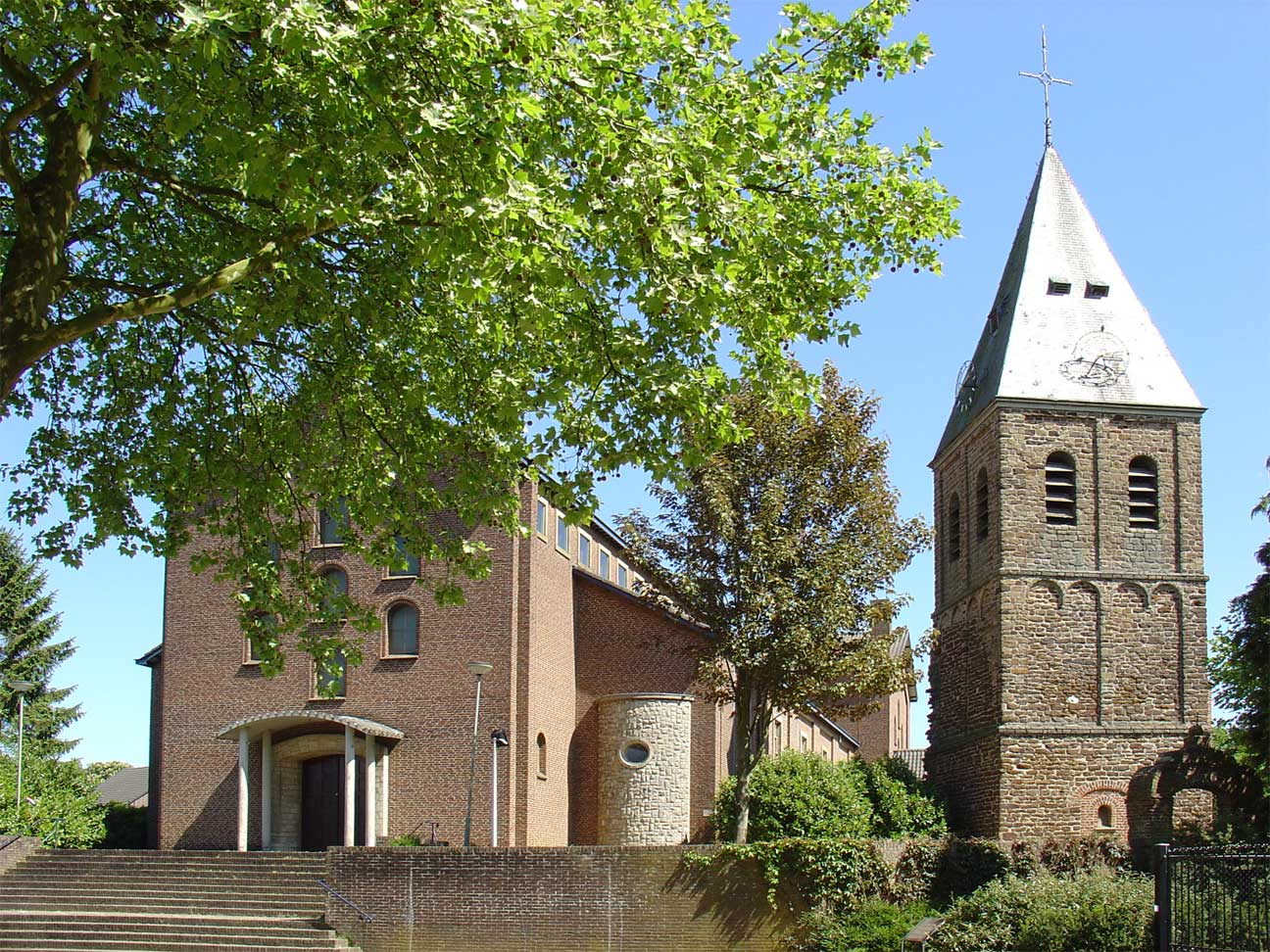
- The church of Afferden

- Flag

- Location in the Netherlands Location in the province of Limburg in the Netherlands
- Coordinates: 51°38′4″N 6°0′46″E
- Country: Netherlands
- Province: Limburg
- Municipality: Bergen, Limburg

Area
  - Total: 18.03 km^{2} (6.96 sq mi)
- Elevation: 15 m (49 ft)

Population (2021)
  - Total: 2,125
  - Density: 117.9/km^{2} (305.3/sq mi)
- Time zone: UTC+1 (CET)
  - Summer (DST): UTC+2 (CEST)
- Postal code: 5851
- Dialing code: 0485

Afferden (Dutch pronunciation: [ˈɑfərdə(n)]; Limburgish: Offere [ˈɔfəʀə]) is a village in the Dutch province of Limburg. It is a part of the municipality of Bergen (L.), and lies about 25 km southeast of Nijmegen.

== History ==
The village was first mentioned in 1293 as Afordia. The etymology is unknown. Afferden is a village along the Maas. It was a heerlijkheid before 1176. The castle was destroyed in the 16th century. In 1648, it became part of Spanish Guelders. In 1713, it became part of Prussia, and in 1815, it became part of the Kingdom of the Netherlands.

The Catholic St Cosmas and Damianus Church is a three aisled basilica like church with a tower at some distance. The tower dates from the late-13th century. The church dated from the 15th century, but was severely damaged in 1945 and demolished. The current church was built between 1957 and 1958 and designed by Johannes Kayser. The tower was repaired in the same period.

The ruins of the Bleijenbeek Castle are to the east of Afferden. In 1390, a fortified farm with tower was built. The tower was destroyed in 1579. Around 1688, the castle was modified and extended in a classical style. In 1945, it was reduced to a ruin.

Afferden was home to 460 people in 1840.

Afferden was severely damaged in 1944 and 1945. During Operation Market Garden, the western side of the Maas was liberated by the British, however the Germans built defences on the eastern side. The grist mill Nooit Gedacht was built in 1958. Its predecessor was built in 1852. In January 1945, the inhabitants were evacuated, and when the miller returned in May 1945, the wind mill was reduced to ruins. Nowadays, it only operates on a voluntary basis.

== Gallery ==
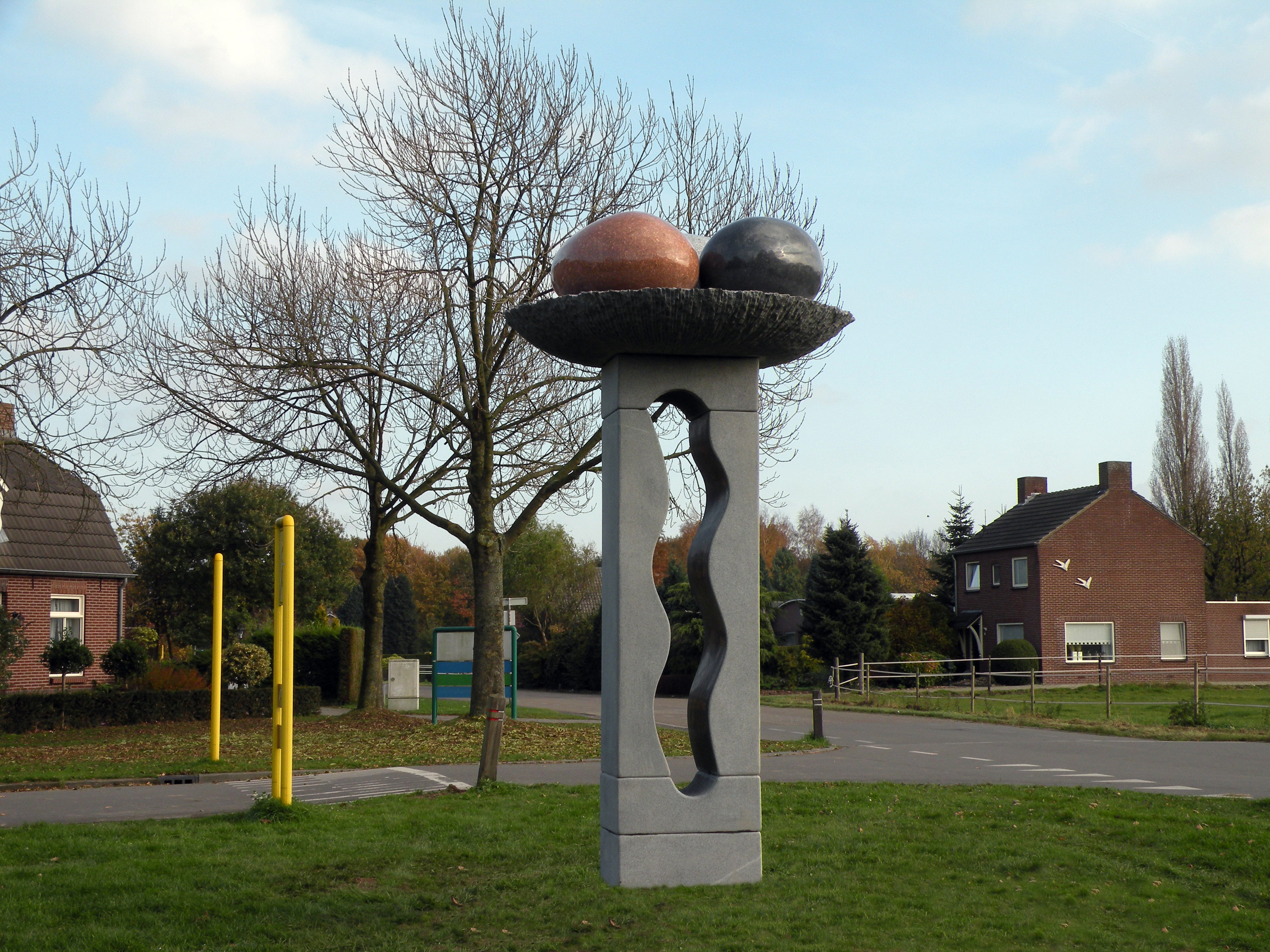
Art in Afferden

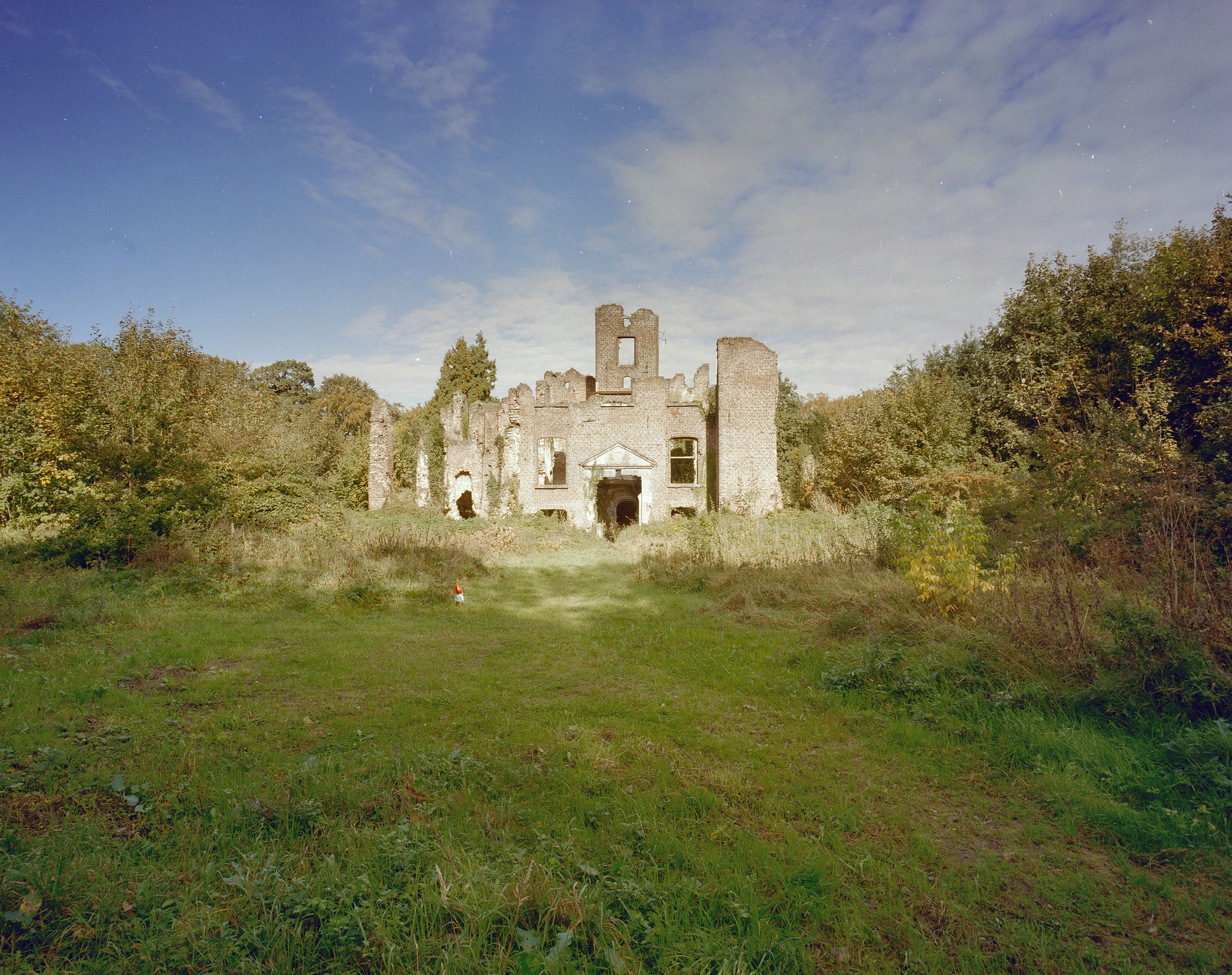
Ruins of Afferden Castle

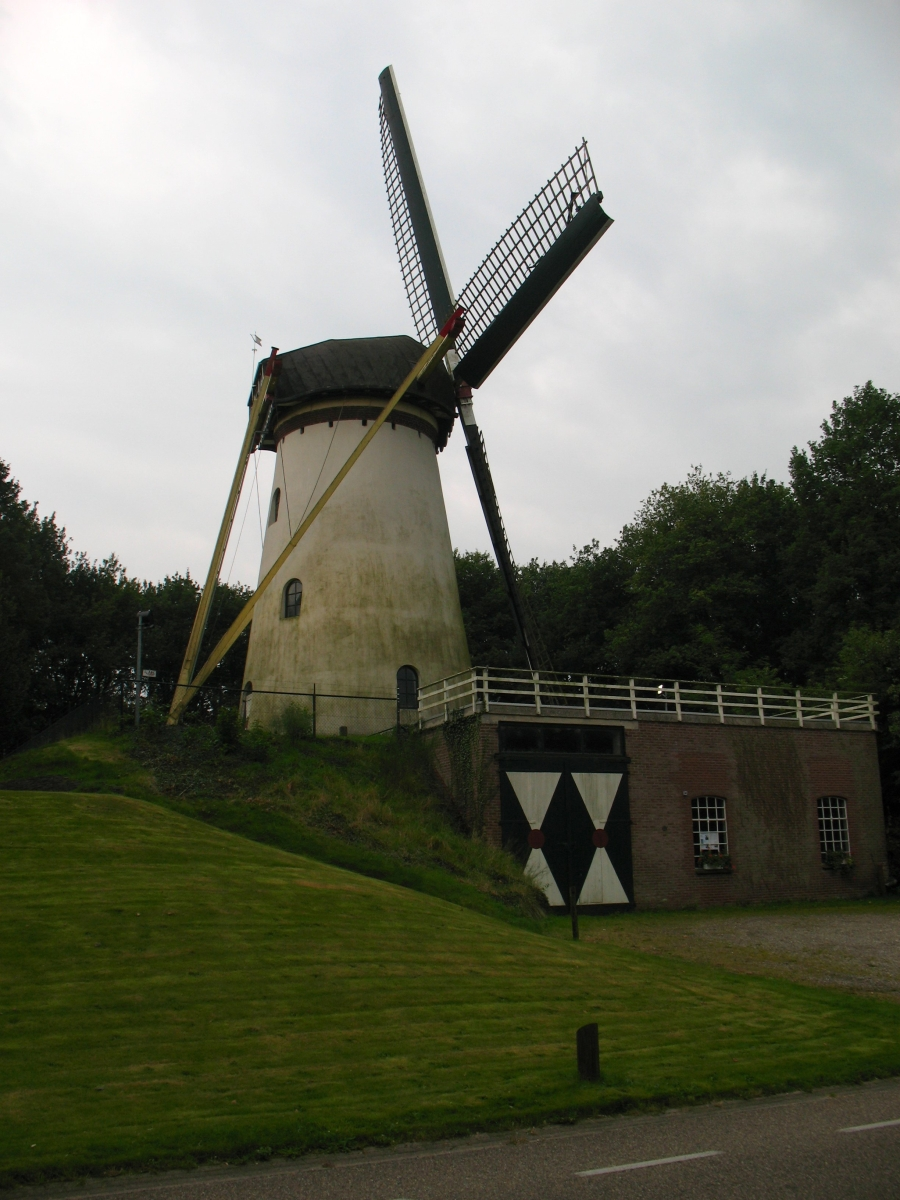
Wind mill Nooit gedacht
