= Queen's Own Royal West Kent Regiment =

Queen's Own (Royal West Kent Regiment) Royal West Kent Regiment (Queen's Own) Queen's Own Royal West Kent Regiment
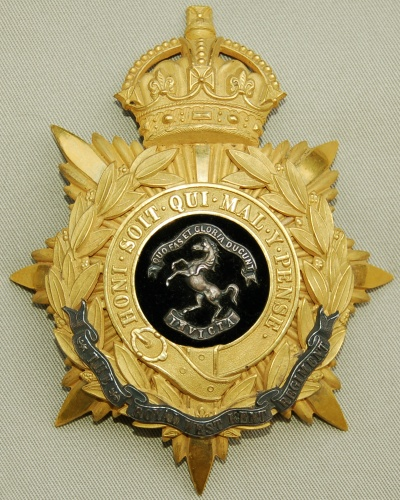
- Officer's helmet plate of the Queen's Own (Royal West Kent Regiment), 1902–1914
- Active: 1881–1961
- Country: United Kingdom
- Branch: British Army
- Type: Infantry
- Role: Line infantry
- Size: 1–2 regular battalions 1–2 militia battalions 2–4 Territorial and Volunteer battalions Up to 12 hostilities-only battalions
- Garrison/HQ: Invicta Park Barracks, Maidstone, Kent
- Nicknames: The Blind Half Hundred, The Celestials, The Devils Royals, The Dirty Half Hundred
- Mottos: Invicta (Invincible), Quo Fas et Gloria Ducunt (Whither Duty and Glory Lead)

The Queen's Own Royal West Kent Regiment was a line infantry regiment of the British Army based in the county of Kent in existence from 1881 to 1961. The regiment was created on 1 July 1881 as part of the Childers Reforms, originally as the Queen's Own (Royal West Kent Regiment), by the amalgamation of the 50th (Queen's Own) Regiment of Foot and the 97th (The Earl of Ulster's) Regiment of Foot. In January 1921, the regiment was renamed the Royal West Kent Regiment (Queen's Own) and, in April of the same year, was again renamed, this time as the Queen's Own Royal West Kent Regiment.

After distinguished service in the Second Boer War, along with both the First and the Second World Wars, on 1 March 1961, the regiment was amalgamated with the Buffs (Royal East Kent Regiment) to form the Queen's Own Buffs, The Royal Kent Regiment, which was destined to be short-lived. On 31 December 1966, the Queen's Own Buffs was merged with the other regiments of the Home Counties Brigade—the Queen's Royal Surrey Regiment, the Royal Sussex Regiment and the Middlesex Regiment—to form the Queen's Regiment, which was in turn amalgamated with the Royal Hampshire Regiment, on 9 September 1992, to form the Princess of Wales's Royal Regiment (Queen's and Royal Hampshires). Throughout its existence, the Queen's Own Royal West Kent Regiment was popularly and operationally known as the Royal West Kents.

== History ==
=== Early years ===
When the regiment was formed, Kent was one of five counties (the others being Surrey, Staffordshire, Lancashire and Yorkshire) that was split to create more than one regiment. Kent was split into two areas, with those in West Kent forming the Queen's Own Royal West Kent Regiment, while those in East Kent becoming the Buffs (East Kent Regiment). The dividing line that separated the two regimental areas was east of the River Medway. The regiment's recruitment area covered both the towns and rural areas of West Kent and a number of south-east London suburbs that were later included in the County of London.

The Childers reforms also affiliated Militia and Volunteer battalions with their local county regiments, giving the Royal West Kents the following organisation:

Regulars

- 1st Battalion – former 50th Foot
- 2nd Battalion – former 97th Foot

Militia

- 3rd Battalion – former 1st Battalion, West Kent Light Infantry
- 4th Battalion – former 2nd Battalion, West Kent Light Infantry, disbanded 1894

Volunteers

- 1st Volunteer Battalion – former 1st Kent Rifle Volunteer Corps
- 2nd Volunteer Battalion – former 3rd Kent (West Kent) Rifle Volunteer Corps
- 3rd Volunteer Battalion – former 4th Kent (Royal Arsenal) Rifle Volunteer Corps
- 4th Volunteer Battalion – new battalion raised in 1900

=== 1881–1914 ===
The 1st Battalion fought at the second battle at Kassassin on 9 September 1882 and at the Battle of Tel el-Kebir a few days later during Anglo-Egyptian War. It then spent two years on garrison duty in Cyprus before being transferred to Sudan, where it fought at the Battle of Ginnis during the Mahdist War. It spent the years up to the outbreak of the First World War on garrison duty, including at Ceylon (together with the 2nd battalion) and Malta.

In 1899, at least twenty members of the regiment raped an elderly Burmese woman in Rangoon, who subsequently died. The matter was initially covered up by military authorities, but when the viceroy, Lord Curzon, upon learning of the affair, dismissed many of the men involved and punished the regiment by sending it to Aden for two years without any leave.

The 2nd Battalion was deployed to South Africa shortly after its formation, in the aftermath of the First Boer War. It was then posted to Ireland and spent the remaining years of the 19th century in the United Kingdom before being sent to Egypt in 1899. After only six months, they returned to the United Kingdom in March 1900, to mobilize into a new 8th Division going to South Africa which was in the middle of the Second Boer War. A total of 1,030 officers and men of the regiment left Southampton in the SS Bavarian in March 1900, but the regiment's only action was a skirmish at Biddulphsberg, alongside the 2nd battalions of the Grenadier and Scots Guards. It stayed in South Africa until early November 1902, when it left Cape Town for Ceylon, then served in Hong Kong, Singapore, Peshawar and Multan before the outbreak of the First World War.

Between 1881 and 1913, the regiment lost 219 men: 22 killed in action or died from wounding, 12 by accident, and 185 from disease. A memorial for those who died in service exists in All Saints Church, Maidstone, which is located next to the regiment's barracks.

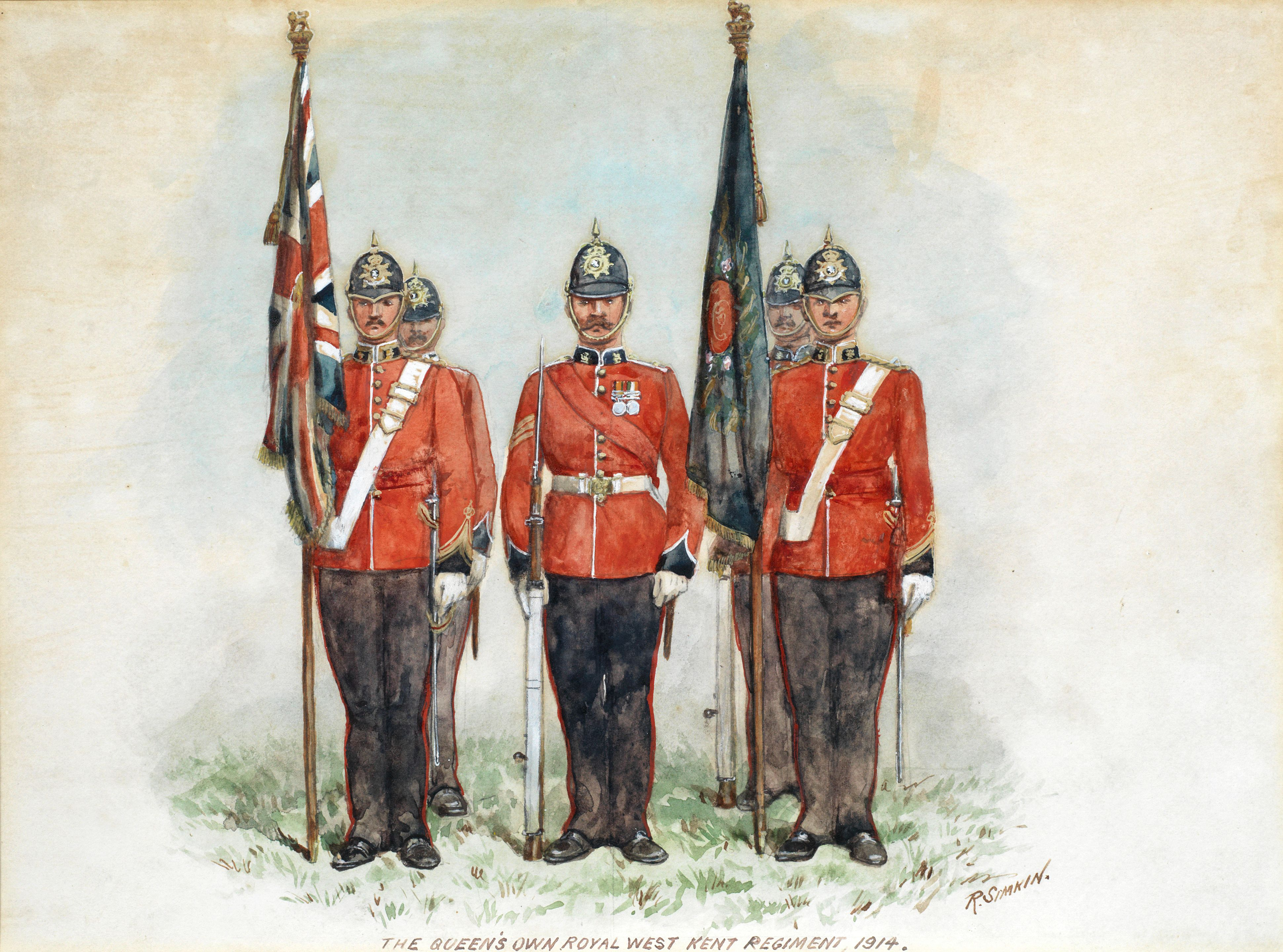
Illustration of troops of the regiment in 1914 by Richard Simkin

By the time the Territorial Force was created in 1908, the suburban area of West Kent had been transferred to the County of London, so the 2nd and 3rd Volunteer battalions became the 20th (County of London) Battalion (Blackheath and Woolwich) in the new London Regiment. The 4th Volunteer Battalion was disbanded, and the 1st VB was formed into the 4th and 5th Battalions of the QORWK in the Kent Brigade of the TF's Home Counties Division. The regiment now had one Reserve and three Territorial battalions.

=== First World War ===
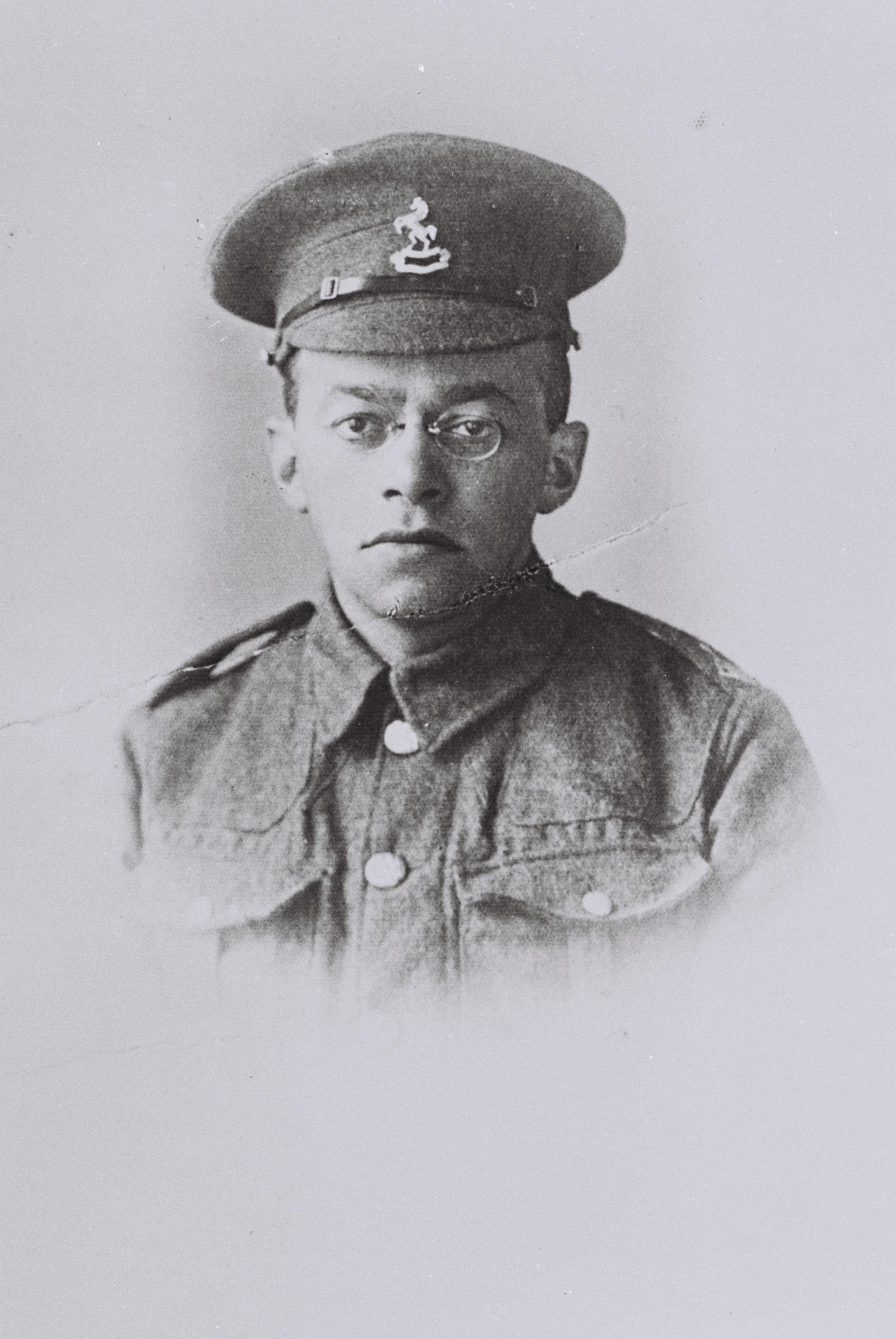
Ze'ev Jabotinsky who served in 16 Platoon of the 20th Battalion of the London Regiment Between 1916 and 1917

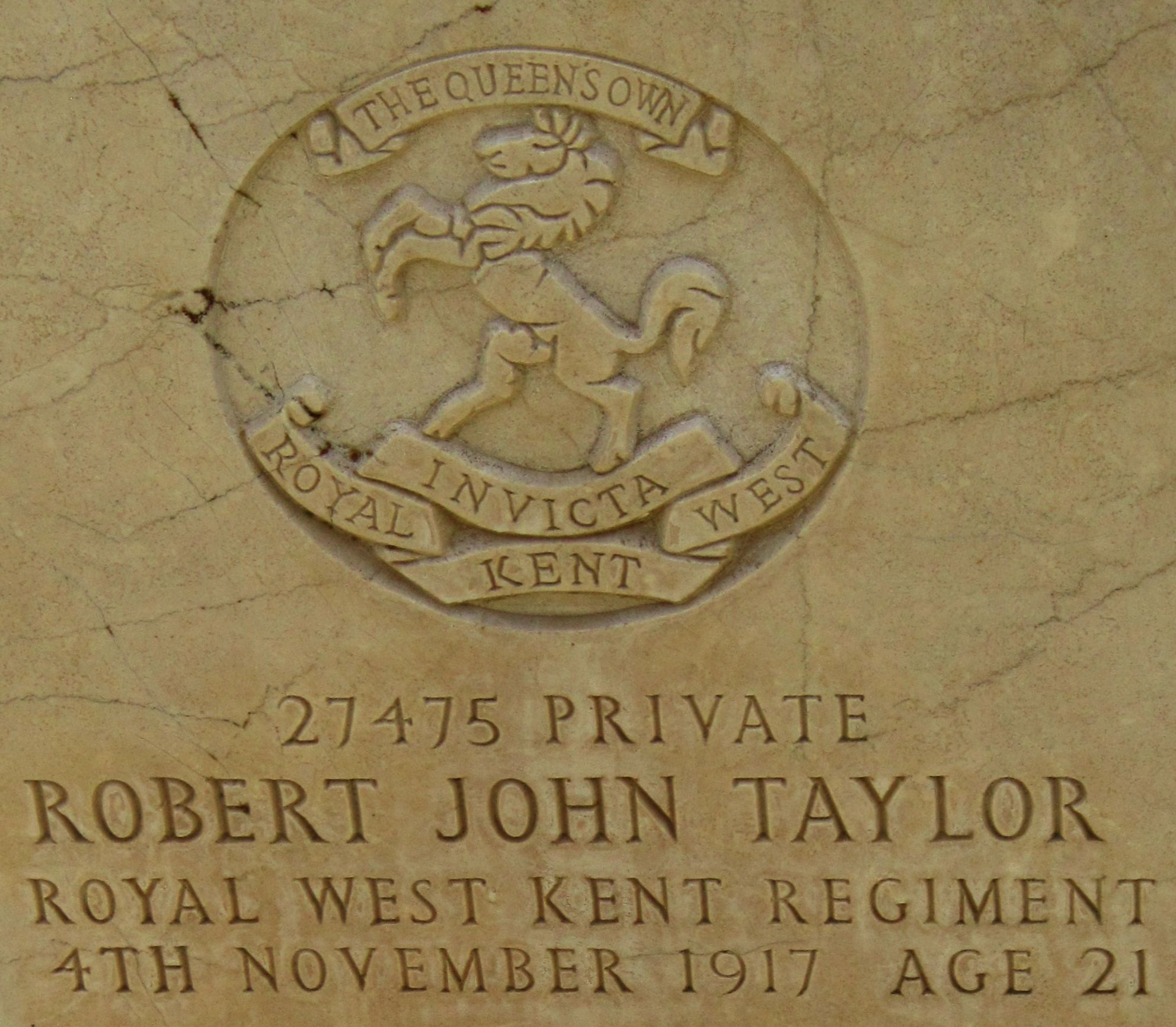
Headstone of a private, 4 November 1917.

During the First World War, over 60,000 men served with the Queen's Own (Royal West Kent Regiment). Three VCs were awarded. However, 6,866 officers and other ranks lost their lives, with many thousands more wounded.

==== Regular Army ====
The 1st Battalion, which was a Regular Army unit stationed in Dublin at the outbreak of war in August 1914, was one of the first units to be moved to France where it became part of the 13th Brigade in the 5th Division. Among its first major engagements were the Battle of Mons on 23 August and the Battle of Le Cateau three days later. In October, the battalion made a heroic stand at the Battle of Neuve Chapelle; being the only unit not to fall back. Out of 750 men, only 300 commanded by a lieutenant and a second lieutenant survived. Apart from a brief period from December 1917 to April 1918, when it was moved with the 5th Division to the Italian Front, the 1st Battalion was stationed on the Western Front for the duration of the war.

The 2nd Battalion was shipped from Multan to Mesopotamia, via Bombay, arriving in Basra in February 1915, where it was attached to the 12th Indian Brigade. Two companies were attached to the 30th Indian Brigade (part of the 6th (Poona) Division) and were captured in the Siege of Kut in April 1916. The remaining companies were attached to 34th Indian Brigade (part of 15th Indian Division), and were transferred to 17th Indian Division in August 1917. The 2nd Battalion remained in Mesopotamia for the duration of the war.

=== Special Reserve ===
On mobilisation the 3rd (Reserve) Battalion moved to its war station at Chatham, where it remained until the summer of 1918. Its role was to equip the Reservists and Special Reservists of the regiment and send them as reinforcement drafts to the Regular battalions serving overseas. Once the pool of reservists had dried up, the 3rd Bn trained thousands of raw recruits for the active service battalions. The 9th (Reserve) Battalion was formed alongside the 3rd Bn at Chatham in October 1914 to provide reinforcements for the New Army battalions. In the summer of 1918 the battalion was moved to Leysdown-on-Sea on the Isle of Sheppey as part of the Thames and Medway Garrison.

==== Territorial Force ====
The 1/4th and 1/5th battalions were both part of the Kent Brigade, alongside the 4th and 5th (Weald) Buffs (East Kent Regiment), of the Home Counties Division and were both sent to British India in late October 1914. Soon after arrival the division was broken up and both battalions were later sent to British Indian Army brigades, the 1/4th joining, in February 1918, the 3rd Quetta Brigade of the 4th (Quetta) Division, the 1/5th to the 54th Indian Brigade in the 18th Indian Division.

The 2/4th Battalion, originally assigned along with the 2/5th Battalion to 202nd (2/1st Kent) Brigade of 67th (2nd Home Counties) Division, took part in the Gallipoli campaign in autumn 1915 and then, having been evacuated, fought in the First Battle of Gaza in March 1917.

The 3/4th Battalion landed at Le Havre in June 1917 and served as a pioneer battalion on the Western Front.

==== New Armies ====
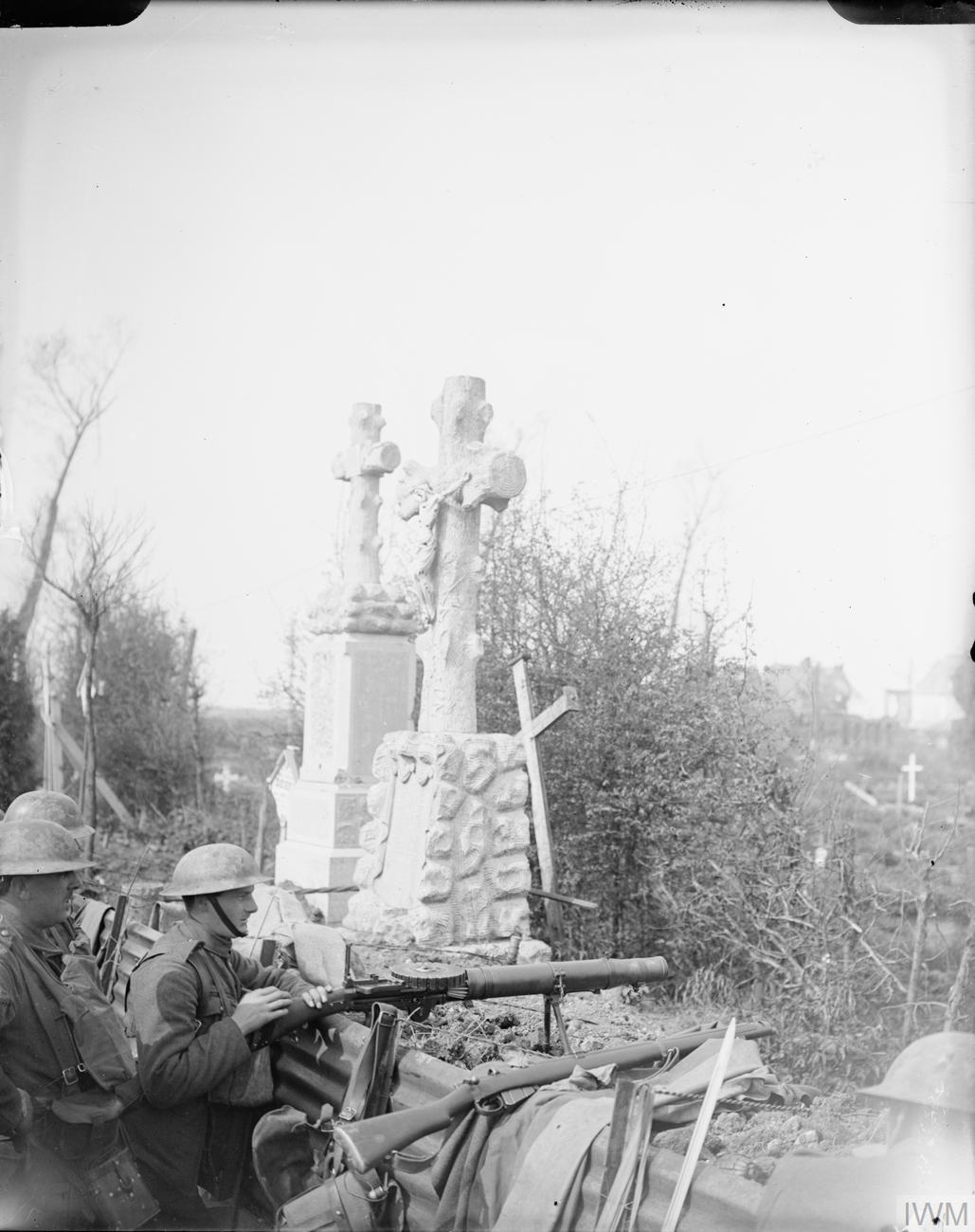
Troops of the 10th (Service) Battalion, Queen's Own (Royal West Kent) Regiment manning a Lewis machine gun in a front line trench running through a cemetery in the Ypres Salient, Belgium, 29 April 1918.

Several of the Service (Hostilities-only) battalions of the New Army fought in France and Flanders and in the Italian Front. At the Battle of Loos in September 1915, the 8th (Service) Battalion, raised the previous September, lost all but one of its officers, and 550 men.

==== War memorial ====
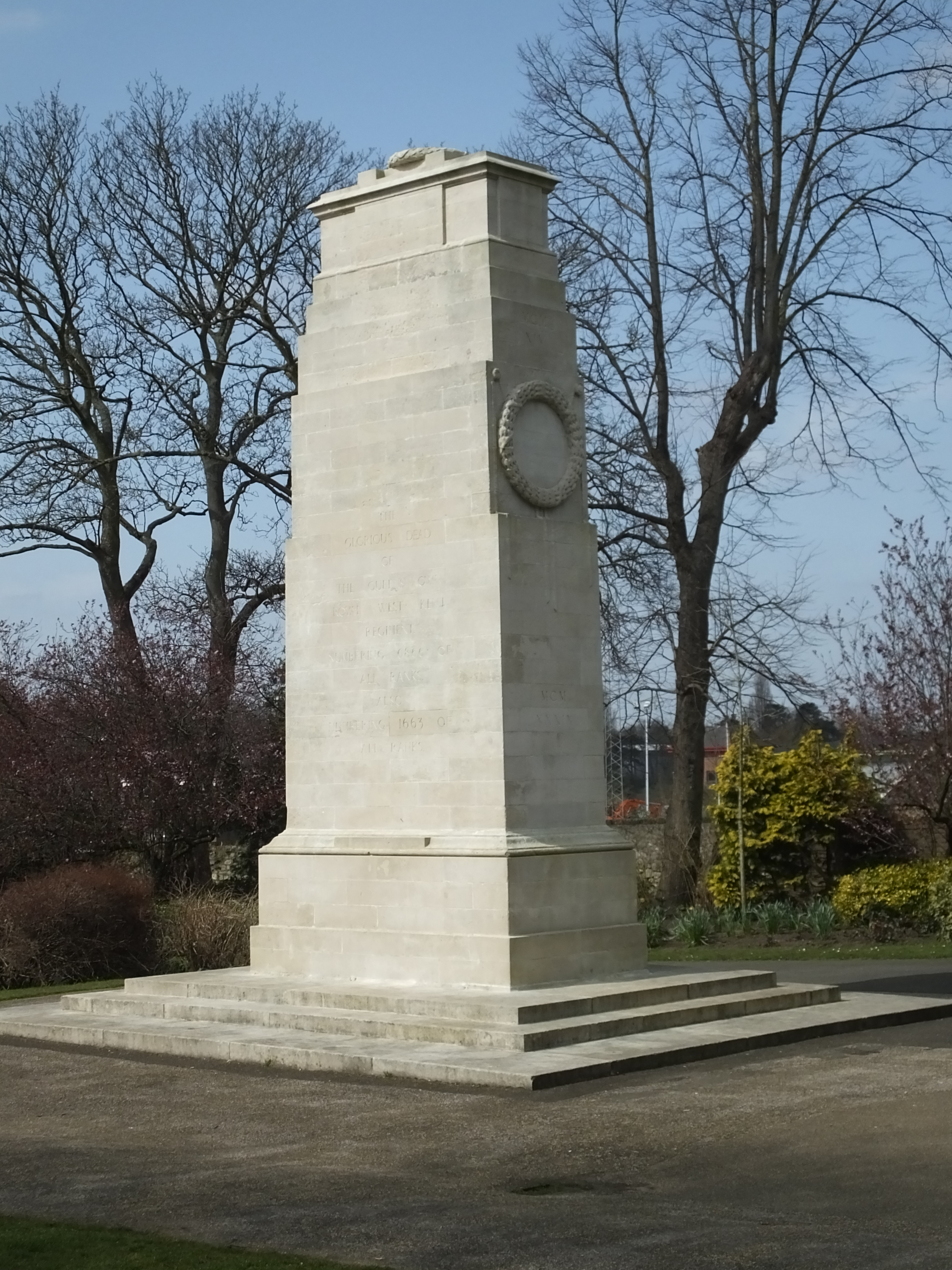
The Queen's Own Royal West Kent Regiment Cenotaph in Brenchley Gardens, Maidstone.

A war memorial (the Queen's Own Royal West Kent Regiment Cenotaph) to the regiment's dead of the First World War stands in Brenchley Gardens in Maidstone. Designed by Sir Edwin Lutyens, who was responsible for the Cenotaph in London among many other war memorials, the memorial is a cenotaph almost identical to that on Whitehall but reduced to two-thirds scale and lacking adorning flags. It was unveiled on 30 July 1921 by Major General Sir Edmund Leach, colonel of the regiment, and dedicated by the Archbishop of Canterbury.

=== Inter-war period ===
At the end of the war, the 1st Battalion was transferred back to India, where it fought (along with the Territorial 1/4th Battalion) in the Third Anglo-Afghan War and then helped put down a Mahsud tribal rebellion in the Northwest Frontier in 1920. It spent the next decade in India and returned home to the United Kingdom in 1937. The 2nd Battalion returned to India from Mesopotamia in 1919, and to the United Kingdom in 1921, briefly becoming part of the British Army of the Rhine. It was stationed at various garrisons in the United Kingdom until 1937, when it moved to Palestine to help with the suppression of the Arab revolt. In 1939, it was moved to Malta.

The London Regiment had ceased to function in 1916, the battalions reverting to the administrative control of their pre-1908 affiliated Regular regiments – the QORWK in the case of the 20th Londons, which reformed in the new Territorial Army as the 20th London Regiment (The Queen's Own). In 1935, the 20th Londons was selected for conversion to the searchlight role as 34th (The Queen's Own Royal West Kent) Anti-Aircraft Battalion of the Royal Engineers, later 34th (The Queen's Own Royal West Kent) Searchlight Regiment of the Royal Artillery. Despite transfer to the RE, the battalion continued to wear its Kentish White Horse cap badge and 20th Londons buttons.

=== Second World War ===
==== Regular Army ====
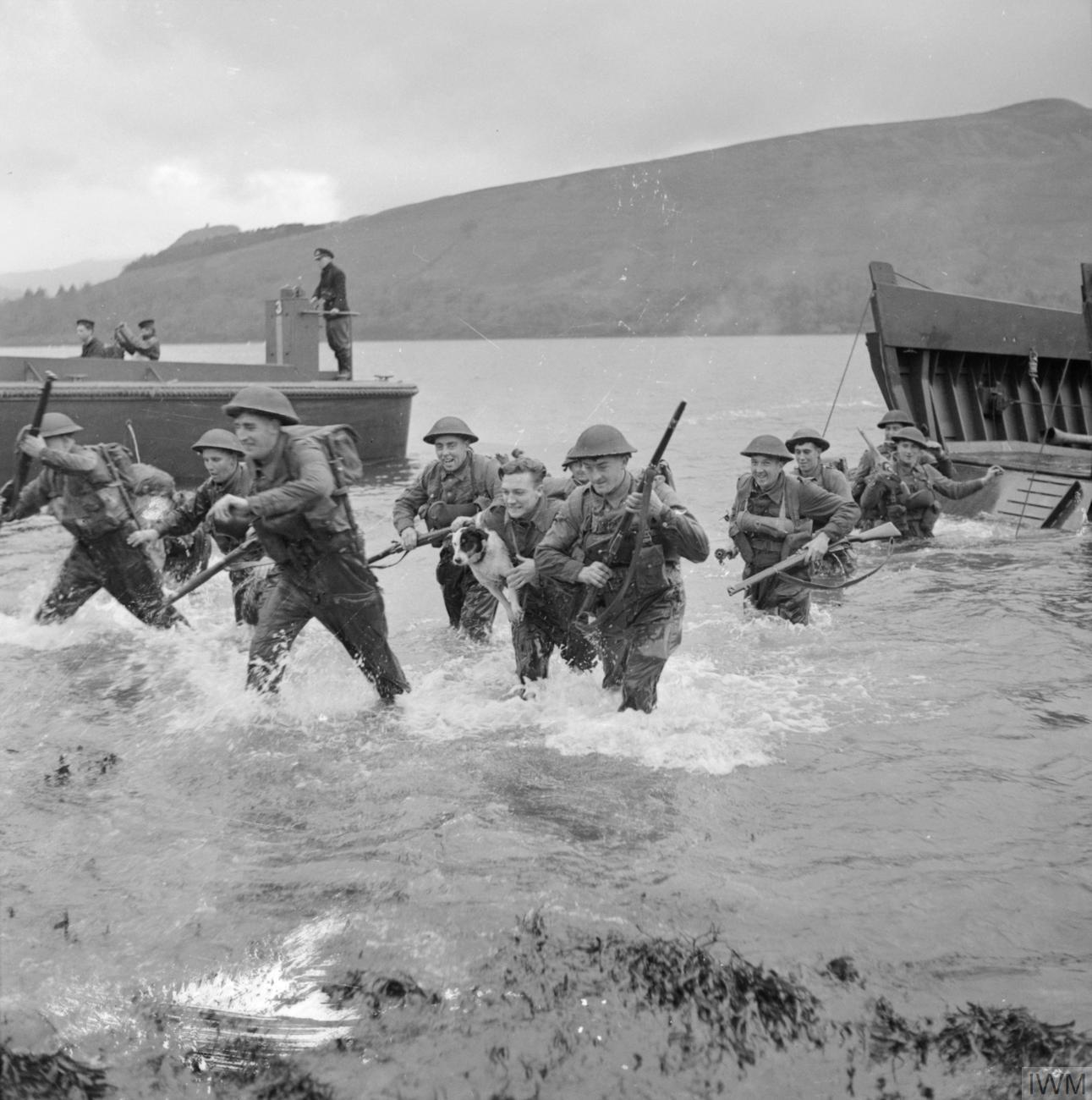
Men of the 1st Battalion, Queen's Own Royal West Kent Regiment wade ashore from landing craft during combined operations training in Scotland, 17 November 1942.

The 1st Battalion was part of the 10th Infantry Brigade of the 4th Infantry Division. Soon after the outbreak of war in September 1939, the battalion was sent to France where it became part of the British Expeditionary Force (BEF). Unlike in the Great War the battalion was not immediately in action, and the first few months of the conflict were spent digging trenches and defensive positions in expectation of a repeat of the trench warfare of the Great War. In early May 1940 the battalion was transferred to the 132nd Infantry Brigade of the 44th (Home Counties) Infantry Division, a TA formation which also included the 4th and 5th Battalions. The battalion fought in the Battle of France and the subsequent retreat to Dunkirk soon after, returning to England via the Dunkirk evacuation, but had suffered heavy casualties, including the loss of two rifle companies. After returning, the battalion was again transferred, in September, to the 12th Infantry Brigade of the 4th Infantry Division. It remained in the United Kingdom, mainly engaged in anti-invasion duties, coastal defence, and training for future combat operations until February 1943, where the battalion left for French North Africa, arriving in Algeria in March, to take part in the final stages of the Tunisian Campaign. The battalion, in late April, suffered over 300 casualties assaulting Peter's Corner and Cactus Farm. The campaign ended in mid-May 1943, with over 238,000 Axis soldiers surrendering. The battalion remained in North Africa, where, due to its heavy losses in Tunisia, it served as a reserve battalion, sending drafts of soldiers to other units as battle-casualty replacements. It remained in this role until late 1943, and in February 1944, the battalion, now up to strength again, was sent to the Italian Front, and fought in the Fourth Battle of Monte Cassino and, after pursuing the retreating German Army, where they helped breach the Trasimene Line, took part in the battles for the Gothic Line. In December 1944, the battalion was transferred to Greece to help maintain order after the German withdrawal and the subsequent break out of the Greek Civil War.

The 2nd Battalion was part of the garrison of Malta during its protracted siege. It then formed part of the 234th Infantry Brigade in the abortive assault on the Italian-held Dodecanese islands in 1943, being captured by the Germans on the island of Leros. Some of the prisoners were transported in cattle trucks from Greece to Wernigerode, in the Harz Mountains, where they were forced to work in support of the German war effort. Others were transported by cattle train from Greece through the Balkans, to Stalag IV-B in Mühlburg, the largest prisoner of war camp in Germany. They were liberated by the advancing Russian Army on 23 April 1945.

The battalion was reconstituted in 1944 by amalgamating the few remaining survivors (less than 100 officers and men) with the 7th Battalion and redesignating it as the new 2nd Battalion. The 7th Battalion had been a training and draft finding formation assigned to the 211th Infantry Brigade, which was part of the 80th Infantry (Reserve) Division. In July 1944, the new 2nd Battalion was assigned to the 184th Infantry Brigade attached to the 61st Division, with which it remained for the rest of the war on home defence duties. In August 1945, the battalion – as well as the division – was preparing to be sent to the Far East, but the move was cancelled when Imperial Japan surrendered ending the war.

==== Territorial Army ====
The 4th Battalion was a Territorial Army (TA) unit that recruited primarily from Royal Tunbridge Wells and formed part of the 132nd Infantry Brigade, serving alongside the 5th West Kents and the 4th Battalion, Buffs (Royal East Kent Regiment). The 132nd Brigade was an integral part of the 44th (Home Counties) Division and, with the rest of the division, was sent to France in April 1940 where it became part of the British Expeditionary Force (BEF) stationed on the Franco-Belgian border. About a month after arriving, it was involved in the battles of France and Dunkirk and was evacuated to England. After returning to England, the battalion spent almost the next two years on home defence against a German invasion. The division left the United Kingdom in May 1942 and went on to serve in the North African Campaign, at Alam el Halfa and El Alamein, until the 44th Division was disbanded in early 1943. The 4th Battalion was then transferred to the 161st Indian Infantry Brigade (alongside 1/1st Punjab Regiment and 4/7th Rajput Regiment), part of the 5th Indian Infantry Division, and fought in the 1944 Burma Campaign, where the battalion played a major role in the Battle of the Tennis Court, part of the larger Battle of Kohima, against the Imperial Japanese Army. During the battle, Lance Corporal John Harman of the 4th Battalion was posthumously awarded the Victoria Cross, the first and only to be awarded to the regiment during the Second World War.

The 5th Battalion of the regiment, recruiting from Bromley, had virtually the same service history as the 4th, with the exception that, when the 44th Division was disbanded, the 5th Battalion was transferred to the 21st Indian Infantry Brigade, now serving alongside two battalions of the Indian Army, of the 8th Indian Infantry Division. With the rest of the division, the battalion fought in the Italian Campaign, alongside the 1st (until it was sent to Greece) and 6th battalions for the rest of the war, and landed in Taranto, Italy on 24 September 1943, shortly after the initial invasion. The battalion fought in the Moro River Campaign and later the Battle of Monte Cassino, the Gothic Line and the final offensive.

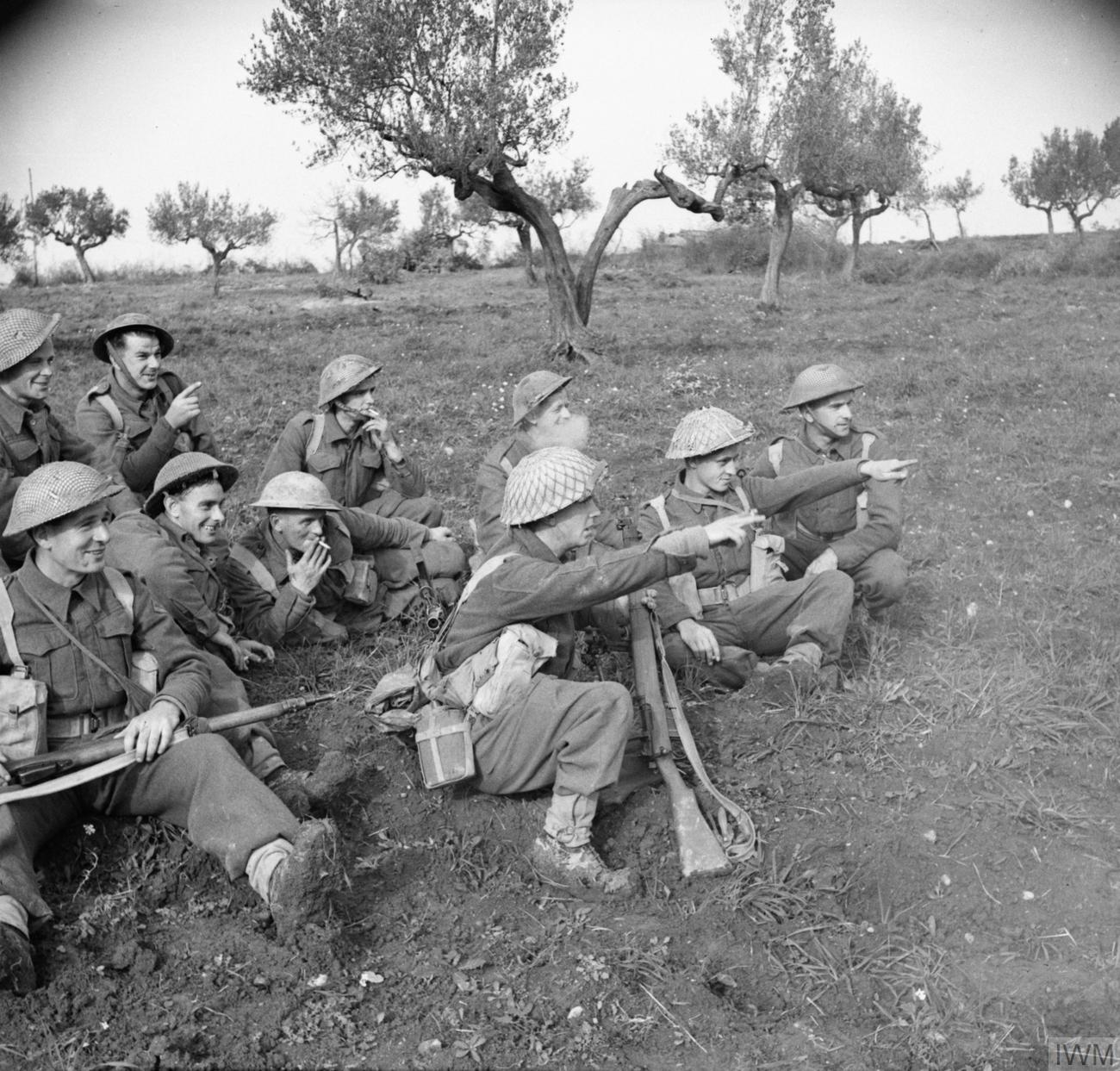
Men of the 5th Battalion, Queen's Own Royal West Kent Regiment in an olive grove, Italy, 16 December 1943.

The 6th and 7th Battalions were both part of the 36th Infantry Brigade, which included the 2/6th East Surrey Regiment (later replaced by the 5th Buffs (Royal East Kent Regiment)), itself assigned to the 12th (Eastern) Infantry Division, a 2nd Line TA duplicate of the 44th (Home Counties) Division. They were sent to France in April 1940 to join the rest of the BEF. The division suffered very heavy casualties in the Battle of Dunkirk, mainly due to most of the men being poorly trained and equipped and with little in the way of supporting units, and was disbanded in July 1940 and the 36th Brigade became an independent brigade. In June 1942, the 36th Brigade was assigned to the 78th Battleaxe Infantry Division. On 20 August 1942, however, the 7th Battalion left the brigade and was reassigned elsewhere, being replaced in the brigade by the 8th Battalion, Argyll and Sutherland Highlanders. With the division, the 6th Royal West Kents landed in North Africa during Operation Torch and were involved in the Run for Tunis. The battalion fought throughout the Tunisian Campaign, notably helping to capture Longstop Hill in April 1943, and later fought in the Allied invasion of Sicily from July to August 1943. The 6th Battalion was serving with the 78th Division throughout the war. Shortly Afterwards, the 6th Battalion, commanded by a future politician for the Conservative Party, Lieutenant Colonel Paul Bryan, landed in Italy on 24 September 1943. Like the 5th Battalion, the 6th Royal West Kents was engaged in combat throughout most of the Italian Campaign, seeing action in the Moro River Campaign, the Battle of Monte Cassino, the fighting around the Gothic Line, and the final offensive in Italy in April 1945, followed shortly after by Germany's surrender and the European war over.

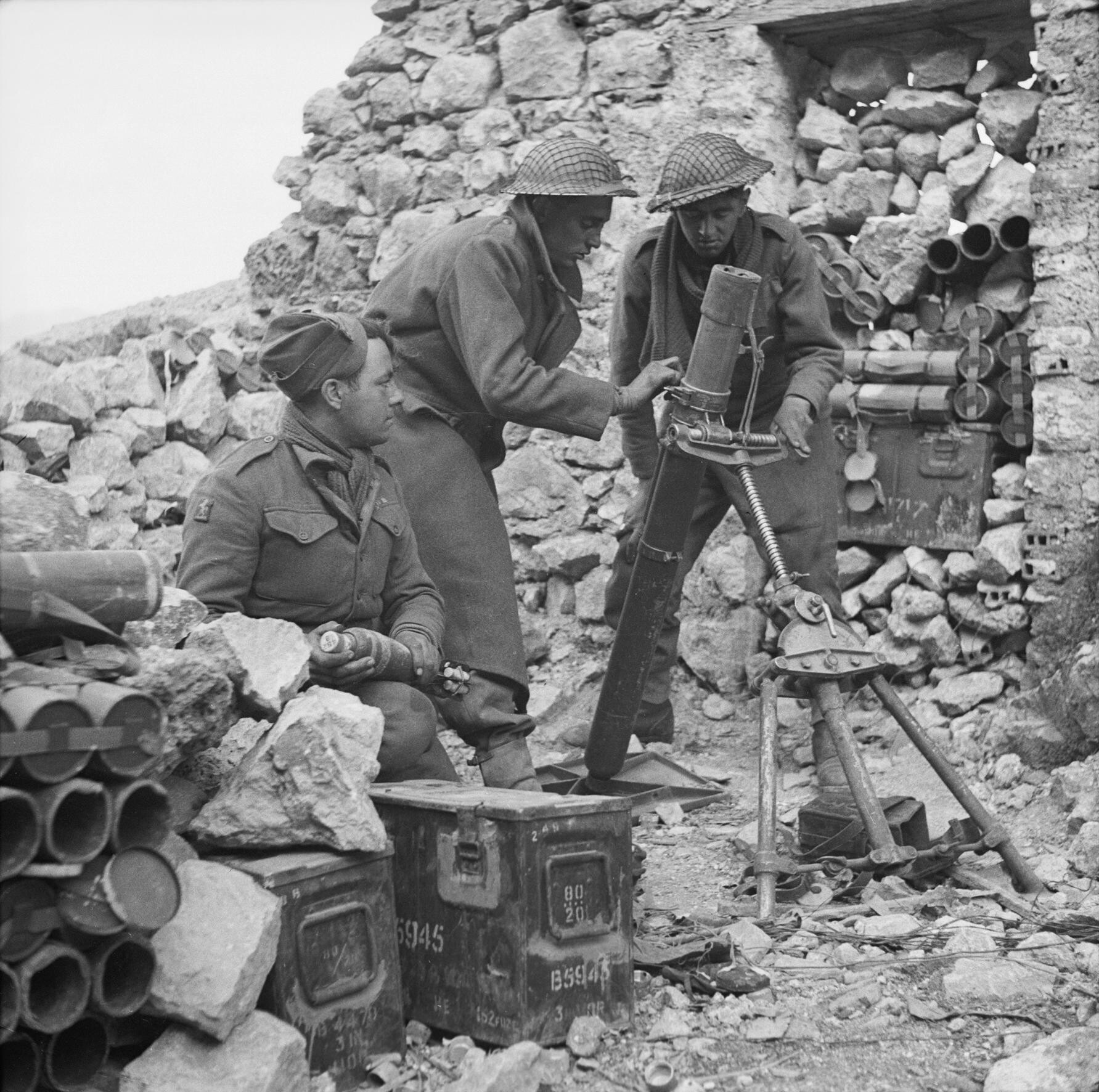
Men of the 6th Battalion, Queen's Own Royal West Kent Regiment man a 3-inch mortar on Monastery Hill, Monte Cassino, Italy, 26 March 1944.

After leaving the 36th Brigade, the 7th Battalion was reassigned to the 136th Brigade, 45th Division until early 1943, when it was reassigned to the 211th Infantry Brigade. On 2 May 1944, the 7th Battalion was formally disbanded and was redesignated as the 2nd Battalion, to replace the original 2nd lost in the Dodecanese Campaign. From 23 July until the end of the war the new 2nd Battalion was assigned to the 184th Brigade of the 61st Division.

By the end of 1944, the 21st Army Group fighting on the Western Front was suffering from a severe shortage of manpower, particularly among the infantry who had all suffered heavy casualties by this time. At the same time, the Luftwaffe was so short of pilots, aircraft and fuel that serious aerial attacks on the United Kingdom could be discounted. In January 1945, the War Office began to reorganise surplus Anti-aircraft regiments in the United Kingdom into infantry battalions, primarily for line of communication and occupation duties in North West Europe, thereby releasing trained infantry for frontline service. The 34th was one of the units selected for conversion to the infantry role, becoming 633rd (Queen's Own Royal West Kent) Infantry Regiment, Royal Artillery and joined the 308th Infantry Brigade.

==== Hostilities-only ====
The 8th (Home Defence) Battalion was raised in 1939, presumably from the National Defence Companies and would have consisted of men with previous military experience, but who were too old or unfit for active duties, along with younger soldiers. In 1940, the younger soldiers of the battalion were split to help form the 70th (Young Soldiers) Battalion. In 1941, the battalion was redesignated the 30th Battalion and was disbanded in 1943.

The 9th Battalion, Queen's Own Royal West Kent Regiment was created in June 1940, consisting mainly of large numbers of conscripts. The 9th Battalion served alongside 7th Battalion, Suffolk Regiment and the 8th and 9th battalions of the Essex Regiment as part of the 210th Independent Infantry Brigade (Home) until early February 1941, when it was transferred to the 6th Support Group, part of the 6th Armoured Division. The battalion was transferred to the Royal Armoured Corps and converted to armour in 1942 as the 162nd Regiment of the Royal Armoured Corps, but retained its Royal West Kent Regiment cap badge on the black beret of the Royal Armoured Corps as did all infantry units converted in this way. However, the regiment was disbanded in 1942, without seeing active service and having only seen home service.

The 50th (Holding) Battalion was raised in late May 1940, with the role of 'holding' men who were homeless, unfit, awaiting orders of returning from abroad. In October 1940, it was redesignated as the 10th Battalion and, on 8 November, became assigned to the 221st Independent Infantry Brigade (Home), alongside the 11th Gloucestershire Regiment and 7th King's Shropshire Light Infantry, both of which were also former holding battalions. The battalion was transferred to the Royal Artillery and converted, in February 1942, into the 119th Light Anti-Aircraft Regiment, Royal Artillery, and served in Home Forces until September 1942, when it joined the 79th Armoured Division. However, it was transferred to the 15th (Scottish) Infantry Division in May 1943 and remained with the division for the rest of the war, serving in the Battle of Normandy in the Battle for Caen, Operation Market Garden and Operation Plunder.

The 70th (Young Soldiers) Battalion was raised in 1940 from the younger soldiers of the 8th (Home Defence) Battalion and also from volunteers around the age of 18 or 19 who had volunteered for service in the British Army and, therefore, were not yet old enough to be conscripted, with the age being 20 at that time. The battalion remained in the United Kingdom for its existence, mainly on home defence and anti-invasion duties, or guarding airfields for the Royal Air Force. However, the battalion was disbanded in 1943 as the British government lowered the age of conscription for the British Armed Forces from 20 to 18.

=== Post-war ===
After the end of the Second World War and with Indian independence in 1948, all infantry regiments in the British Army were reduced to only a single regular battalion. and, as a result, the 2nd Battalion was disbanded in 1948 (nominally being amalgamated with the 1st Battalion).

When the Territorial Army was reconstituted in 1947, 633 Infantry Regiment reformed at Blackheath as 569 (The Queen's Own) Searchlight Regiment. In March 1949 it was redesignated 569 (The Queen's Own) (Mixed) Light Anti-Aircraft/Searchlight Regiment, reflecting a partially changed role and the inclusion of members of the Women's Royal Army Corps (hence the designation 'Mixed'). The regiment still wore its 20th Londons cap badge, together with RA collar badges. About 1951 its personnel adopted a supplementary shoulder title of 'THE QUEEN'S OWN' in grey on black beneath the RA shoulder title and above the AA Command arm badge. AA Command was disbanded in March 1955, and as part of the reduction the regiment was merged into 265 Light Anti-Aircraft Regiment, becoming 'Q Battery (The Queens Own)', based at Lewisham. Further reductions in 1961 saw the whole regiment become 'Q (London) Battery' at Grove Park, perpetuating the history of four separate London battalions and regiments, and the Queen's Own lineage was discontinued.

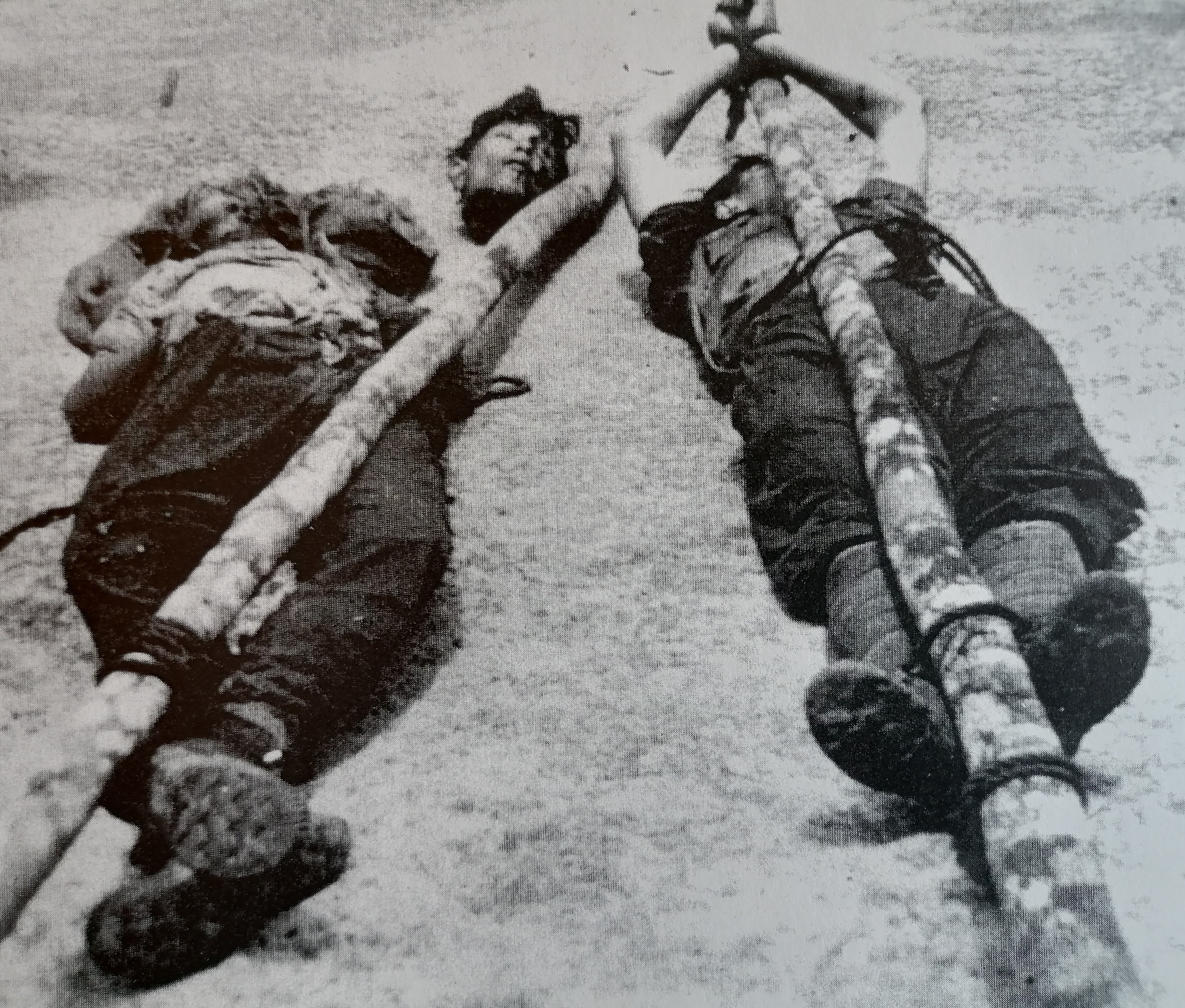
The remains of three MNLA guerrillas killed by soldiers of the Queen's Own Royal West Kent Regiment during the Malayan Emergency

=== Counterinsurgencies ===
From 1951 to 1954, the sole remaining Regular Battalion fought against the Malayan National Liberation Army (MNLA) during the Malayan Emergency. During their time in Malaya, the West Kents fought and killed numerous MNLA guerrillas, many of whom they decapitated. In 2001, former soldiers of the regiment admitted that this was a common practice among British units in Malaya, and that it caused a public outcry in Britain.

Later they took part in the occupation of the Suez canal zone in 1956. Between 1958–1959 the regiment were sent to fight against the National Organisation of Cypriot Fighters (EOKA) during the Cyprus Emergency.

In 1959, it returned to Britain for the last time, being amalgamated in 1961 with the Buffs (Royal East Kent Regiment), to form the Queen's Own Buffs, The Royal Kent Regiment.

== Regimental museum ==
The Queen's Own Royal West Kent Regiment Museum is based at Maidstone Museum & Art Gallery in Maidstone.

== In popular culture ==
The Home Guard platoon in the BBC series Dad's Army wore the cap badge of the Queen's Own Royal West Kent Regiment.

== Battle honours ==
The battle honours were as follows:

- Egypt 1882, Nile 1884–85, South Africa 1900–02
- The Great War (18 battalions): Mons, Le Cateau, Retreat from Mons, Marne 1914, Aisne 1914, La Bassée, Messines 1914 '17, Ypres 1914 '15 '17 '18, Hill 60, Gravenstafel, St. Julien, Frezenberg, Loos, Somme 1916 '18, Albert 1916 '18, Bazentin, Delville Wood, Pozières, Guillemont, Flers-Courcelette, Morval, Thiepval, Le Transloy, Ancre Heights, Ancre 1916 '18, Arras 1917 '18, Vimy 1917, Scarpe 1917, Oppy, Pilckem, Langemarck 1917, Menin Road, Polygon Wood, Broodseinde, Passchendaele, Cambrai 1917 '18, St. Quentin, Rosières, Avre, Villers Bretonneux, Lys, Hazebrouck, Kemmel, Amiens, Bapaume 1918, Hindenburg Line, Épéhy, Canal du Nord, St. Quentin Canal, Courtrai, Selle, Sambre, France and Flanders 1914–18, Italy 1917–18, Suvla, Landing at Suvla, Scimitar Hill, Gallipoli 1915, Rumani, Egypt 1915–16, Gaza, El Mughar, Jerusalem, Jericho, Tell 'Asur, Palestine 1917–18, Defence of Kut al Amara, Sharqat, Mesopotamia 1915–18
- Afghanistan 1919
- The Second World War: Defence of Escaut, Forêt de Nieppe, North-West Europe 1940, Alam el Halfa, El Alamein, Djebel Abiod, Djebel Azzag 1942, Oued Zarga, Djebel Ang, Medjez Plain, Longstop Hill 1943, Si Abdallah, North Africa 1942–43, Centuripe, Monte Rivoglia, Sicily 1943, Termoli, San Salvo, Sangro, Romagnoli, Impossible Bridge, Villa Grande, Cassino, Castle Hill, Liri Valley, Piedimonte Hill, Trasimene Line, Arezzo, Advance to Florence, Monte Scalari, Casa fortis, Rimini Line, Savio Bridgehead, Monte Pianoereno, Monte Spaduro, Senio, Argenta Gap, Italy 1943–45, Greece 1944–45, Leros, Malta 1940–42, North Arakan, Razabil, Mayu Tunnels, Defence of Kohima, Taungtha, Sittang 1945, Burma 1943–45

== Uniforms ==
As the 97th Foot the regiment wore sky-blue facings on the standard red coats of the British line infantry. This colour, which was unusual in the British Army, was obtained from the Order of Saint Patrick decoration and led to the "Celestials" nickname. The 50th Foot (the 1st Battalion of the Queen's Own Royal West Kent Regiment) had black facings until 1831 and subsequently dark blue. Officers wore silver braid and other distinctions until gold was introduced in 1830. The khaki service dress adopted in 1902, and battle dress from 1938, were both of the universal pattern.

== Colonels-in-Chief ==
Colonels-in-Chief of the regiment were:

- 1935–1947: Col. HRH Prince George, Duke of Kent, KG, KT, GCMG, GCVO
- 1947–?1961: HRH Princess Marina, Duchess of Kent, CI, GCVO, GBE

== Regimental Colonels ==
Colonels of the regiment were:

The Queen's Own (Royal West Kent Regiment) (1881)

- 1881: (1st Battalion) Gen. Sir Edward Walter Forestier-Walker, KCB
- 1881–1888: (2nd Battalion) Gen. John Maxwell Perceval, CB
- 1881–1885: (1st Battalion) Gen. Hon. Sir Francis Colborne, KCB
- 1888–1890: Gen. William Richard Preston
- 1890–1904: Gen. Sir Folwer Burton, KCB
- 1904–1921: Maj-Gen. Sir Edmund Leach, KCB

The Queen's Own Royal West Kent Regiment (1921)

- 1921–1927: Maj-Gen. Sir Edwin Alfred Hervey Alderson, KCB
- 1927–1936: Lt-Gen. Sir James Wilton O'Dowda, KCB, CSI, CMG
- 1936–1946: Gen. Sir Charles Bonham-Carter, GCB, CMG, DSO
- 1946–1949: Brig. Noel Irwine Whitty, DSO
- 1949–1959: Lt-Gen. Sir William Pasfield Oliver, GBE, KCB, KCMG
- 1959–1961: Maj-Gen. Dennis Edmund Blaquiere Talbot, CB, CBE, DSO, MC, DL (afterwards Associate Colonel of Queen's Own Buffs, The Royal Kent Regiment)
- 1961: Regiment amalgamated with Buffs (Royal East Kent Regiment) to form the Queen's Own Buffs, The Royal Kent Regiment

== Alliances ==
New Zealand – 1st (Canterbury) Regiment (1913–1921)
