= 118th Light Anti-Aircraft Regiment, Royal Artillery =

11th Battalion, Gloucestershire Regiment 118th Light Anti-Aircraft Regiment, RA
- Cap badge of the Royal Artillery
- Active: 28 May 1940–28 February 1945
- Country: United Kingdom
- Branch: British Army
- Role: Infantry; Air defence
- Size: Battalion; Regiment
- Part of: Fourteenth Army
- Engagements: Burma Campaign

The 118th Light Anti-Aircraft Regiment, Royal Artillery, (118th LAA Rgt) was an air defence unit of the British Army during World War II. Initially raised as an infantry battalion of the Gloucestershire Regiment in 1940, it transferred to the Royal Artillery in 1942. It served in Home Forces and then went to Assam to defend Fourteenth Army's vital bases and airfields during the Burma Campaign until it was broken up in 1944.

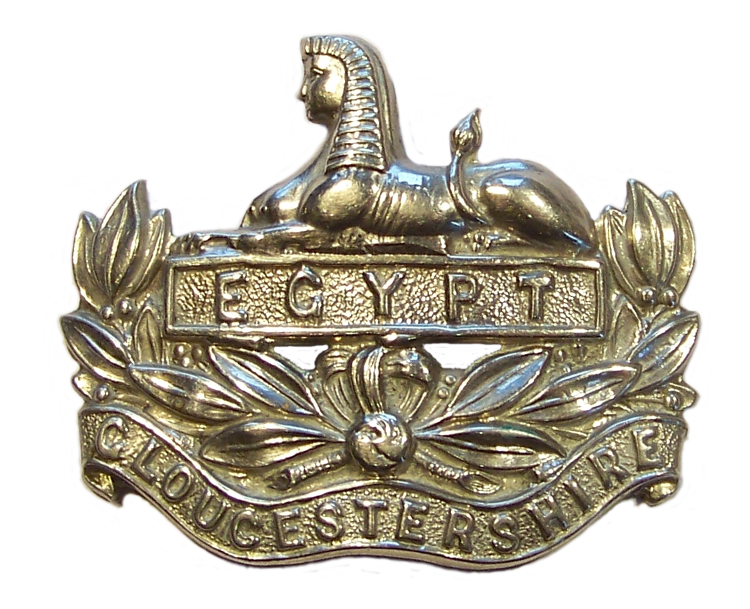
Cap badge of the Gloucestershire Regiment

== 11th Battalion, Gloucestershire Regiment ==
11th Battalion, Gloucestershire Regiment (not to be confused with 11th (Reserve) Battalion, Gloucestershire Regiment, formed in World War I), was originally formed on 28 May 1940 as 50th Holding Battalion, Gloucestershire Regiment, as part of the rapid expansion of the Army with wartime conscripts, but it converted to infantry on 9 October that year as the 11th Battalion. On 8 November it joined 221st Independent Infantry Brigade (Home) when that static defence formation was organised at Chatham, Kent. On 26 February 1941 the brigade was temporarily attached to 2nd Division, at that time serving in the East Riding of Yorkshire as part of I Corps. On 19 March the brigade came under the new Yorkshire County Division formed for coast defence in that area.

On 1 December Yorkshire County Division was downgraded to East Riding Coastal Area and 221st Brigade was broken up. On 11 December 11th Gloucesters transferred to 218th Independent Brigade, still in the East Riding Coastal Area. However, the battalion did not remain there long: it left 218th Bde on 31 January 1942 and next day it was transferred to the Royal Artillery (RA) and began to retrain as a light anti-aircraft (LAA) regiment.

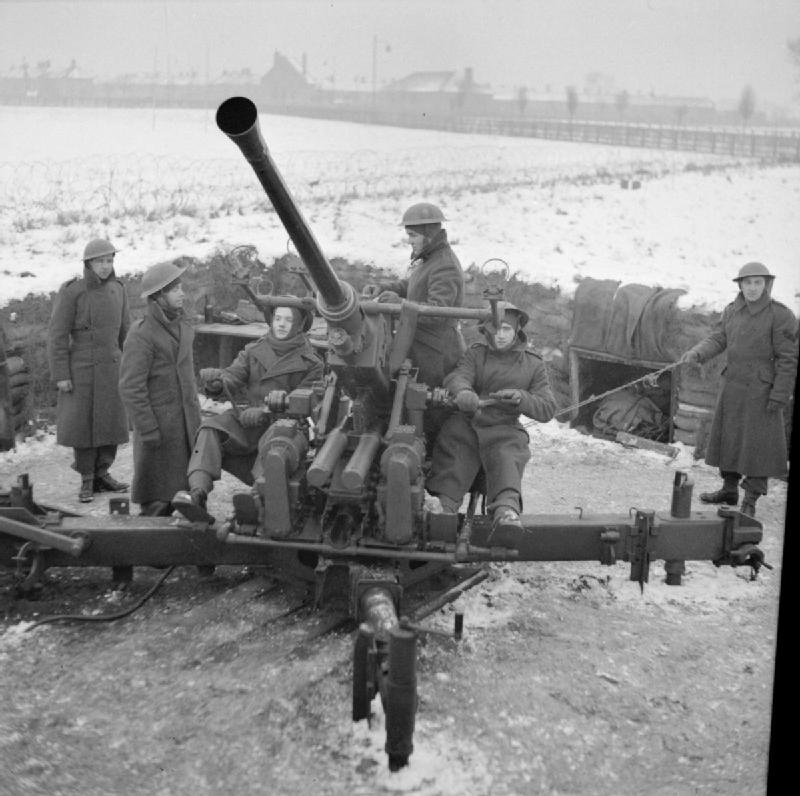
A Bofors 40 mm LAA gun crew under training, January 1942.

== Anti-Aircraft conversion ==
The unit was designated 118th Light Anti-Aircraft Regiment with 387, 388 and 389 LAA Batteries. After training it joined it joined Anti-Aircraft Command in February 1942, but left before it had been assigned to a brigade. On 7 May the regiment joined 49th (West Riding) Infantry Division. This formation had just been reconstituted in Western Command after its units returned from service in Iceland. However, 118th LAA Rgt left the division on 12 August 1942 and came under direct War Office control preparatory to going overseas.

=== India ===
The regiment embarked for India in February 1943 and arrived at Bombay on 11 April. It proceeded to Bangalore under command of 160 Line of Communication Area. It was commanded by Lieutenant-Colonel T. Haighton and comprised 54 Bofors 40 mm guns. It was at first assigned to 3rd Indian Anti-Aircraft Brigade, which was responsible for air defence of the coastal cities of Bombay, Madras and Vizagapatam.

=== Burma Campaign ===
Formation sign of Fourteenth Army.

On 23 June the regiment moved to the Tezpur area in Assam where it came under 9th Anti-Aircraft Brigade. This brigade was deployed defending 15 separate airfields, each with eight heavy AA (HAA) and 12 LAA guns, together with key supply points at Digboi (airfield and oil installations), Dimapur, Lumding, and Tinsukia. By September the brigade had also been given responsibility for Ledo, the vital railhead and airbase for the US transport aircraft flying over The Hump to supply Chinese forces. These were under sustained attack by Japanese Mitsubishi Ki-21 ('Sally') bombers escorted by Mitsubishi A6M Zero fighters. The increasing HAA defences and fighters began to drive the Japanese to attack at low level, which made them targets for the LAA Bofors guns.

On 13 December 1943 the regiment came under command of 251 Line of Communication Sub-Area, and by March 1944 it was part of 14th West African Anti-Aircraft Brigade under Fourteenth Army. The brigade defended the bases in Assam and the Surma Valley during the decisive battles of Imphal and Kohima. 14th West African AA Brigade moved batteries of 118th LAA Rgt up to Dimapur, and then went forward to the airfields at Imphal and Pallel as they were relieved from Japanese ground attacks.

=== Disbandment ===
By now Japanese air power in Burma had been broken, but Fourteenth Army was suffering a manpower shortage as it went over to the offensive. The decision was made to break up a number of AA units and redeploy the personnel to other roles, particularly to the infantry. 118th Light AA Regiment was broken up on 31 August and its men drafted away, the process being complete by the end of the year. The regiment was formally disbanded on 28 February 1945.
