= 119th Light Anti-Aircraft Regiment, Royal Artillery =

10th Battalion, Queen's Own Royal West Kent Regiment 119th Light Anti-Aircraft Regiment, RA
- Cap badge of the Royal Artillery
- Active: January 1940–31 October 1945
- Country: United Kingdom
- Branch: British Army
- Role: Infantry; Air defence
- Size: Battalion; Regiment
- Part of: 79th Armoured Division; 15th (Scottish) Infantry Division
- Engagements: Operation Epsom; Operation Greenline; Operation Bluecoat; Seine crossing Operation Market Garden; Operation Pheasant; Operation Veritable; Operation Plunder; Operation Enterprise

The 119th Light Anti-Aircraft Regiment, Royal Artillery, (119th LAA Rgt) was an air defence unit of the British Army during World War II. Initially raised as an infantry battalion of the Queen's Own Royal West Kent Regiment (QORWK) in 1940, it transferred to the Royal Artillery in 1942. It served with 79th Armoured Division and then 15th (Scottish) Infantry Division, with which it fought in Normandy (Operation Overlord) and through the campaign in North West Europe until VE Day.

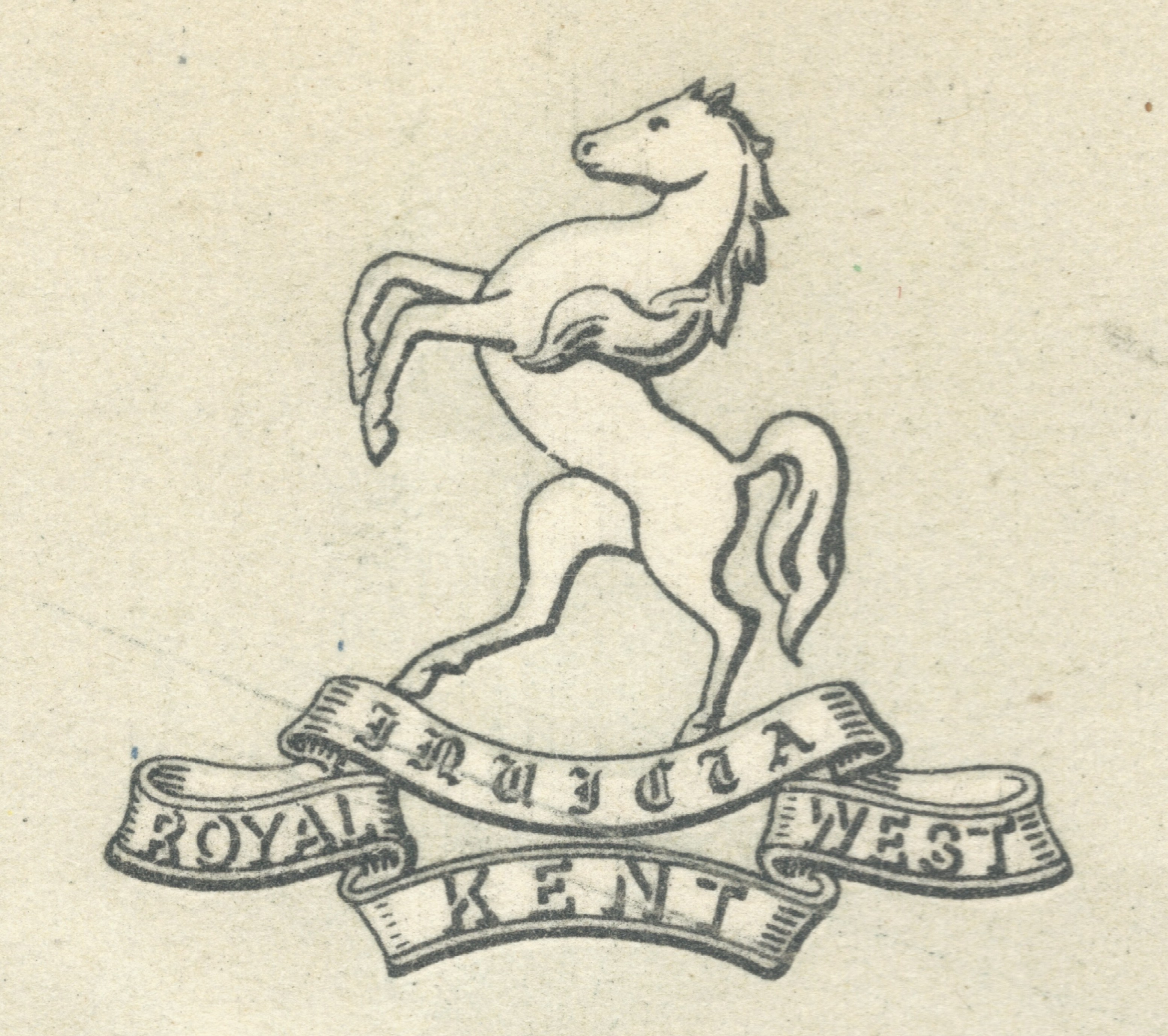
Queen's Own Royal West Kent Regiment's 'Invicta' cap badge.

== 10th Battalion, Queen's Own Royal West Kent Regiment ==
The unit was originally formed in January 1940 as a company of 14th (Holding) Battalion at Tonbridge in Kent, as part of the rapid expansion of the Army with wartime conscripts. When 14th (H) Battalion was disbanded in May 1940, the company was expanded into 50th Holding Battalion, Queen's Own Royal West Kent Regiment (QORWK), and converted to a normal infantry battalion on 9 October that year as 11th Battalion, QORWK. On 8 November it joined 221st Independent Infantry Brigade (Home) when that static defence formation was organised at Chatham, Kent. On 26 February 1941 the brigade was temporarily attached to 2nd Division, at that time serving in the East Riding of Yorkshire as part of I Corps. On 19 March the brigade came under the new Yorkshire County Division formed for coast defence in that area.

221st Brigade was broken up at the end of the year and on 1 February 1942 10th QORWK was transferred to the Royal Artillery (RA) to begin retraining as a light anti-aircraft (LAA) regiment equipped with Bofors 40 mm guns.

== 119th Light Anti-Aircraft Regiment ==
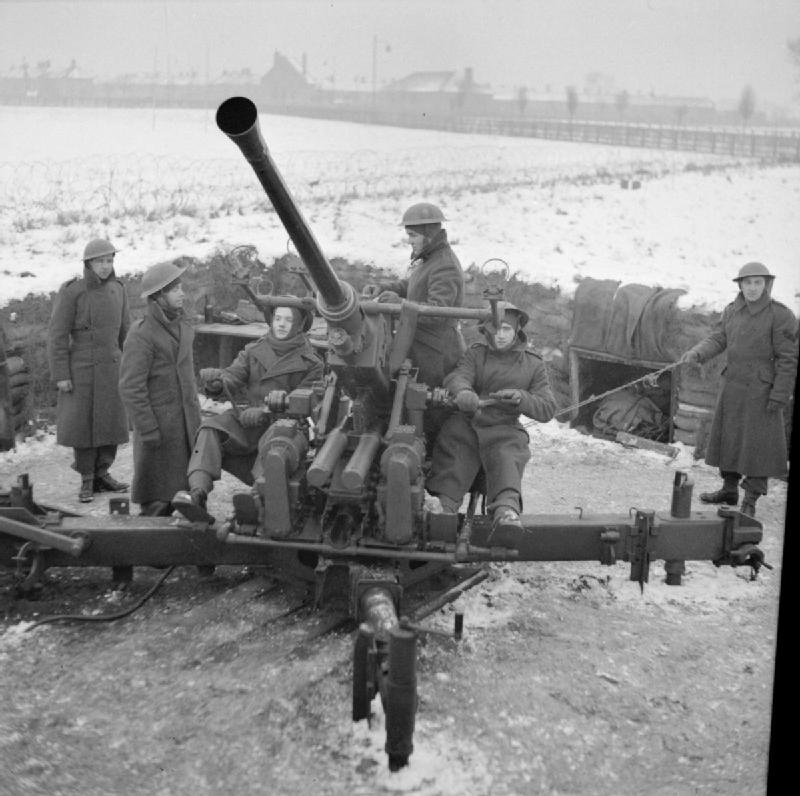
A Bofors 40 mm LAA gun crew under training, January 1942.

The unit was designated 119th Light Anti-Aircraft Regiment with 390, 391 and 392 LAA Batteries. After initial training it joined Anti-Aircraft Command in February, but left in May before it had been assigned to a brigade.

The regiment joined the newly formed 79th Armoured Division in Yorkshire on 10 September 1942. However, the British Army had already begun to suffer manpower shortages and had more divisions than it could support. 79th Armoured was therefore converted into a holding formation for specialised armour units and gave up its artillery component. On 18 May 1943, 119th LAA Rgt was transferred to 15th (Scottish) Infantry Division. This was a second-line Territorial Army formation that was being brought up to full establishment as part of Second Army in 21st Army Group preparing for the Allied landings in Normandy (Operation Overlord).

=== Overlord training ===
In September 1943, 15th (S) Division moved from Northumberland to a training area in the West Riding of Yorkshire and began a series of training exercises through the winter. In mid-February the whole division participated in a 12-day training exercise (Exercise Eagle) in the Yorkshire Wolds along with the other divisions assigned to VIII Corps. On 14 March 1944 the regiment's three batteries were augmented to a strength of four troops each when 69–71 Trps joined from 340 LAA Bty of 103rd LAA Rgt, which had been broken up. This brought the establishment of Bofors guns up to 72, but before D-Day some LAA regiments began exchanging some of their Bofors for multiple-barrelled 20 mm guns (usually Oerlikons or Polstens). In the case of 119th LAA Rgt, the additional troop to each battery (X, Y and Z) was equipped with 20 mms. In April 1944 the division moved to its concentration area in Sussex to prepare for embarkation.

=== Normandy ===
The assault formations of 21st Army Group landed on D Day (6 June). The advanced parties of the regiment (under Lieutenant-Colonel John 'Sailor' Young, who remained in command until the end of the war) began moving off from Lancing, West Sussex, to their marshalling area. On 16 June they embarked at London Docks: RHQ and 391 Battery HQ (BHQ) with A, B, and C Trps aboard Motor Transport 76 (S81), 392 BHQ, I Trp and few others aboard S59; G and F Trps followed in a later convoy. The transports sailed to Southend-on-Sea and joined a convoy that arrived off Courseulles-sur-Mer (Juno Beach) on the evening of 17 June. Although parts of 15th (S) Division had begun landing on 13 June, the weather deteriorated and the parties of 119th LAA Rgt had to wait aboard ship, subjected to some night bombing, until 23 June when they transferred to a Landing Ship, Tank, and disembarked, losing a few vehicles drowned in the process. RHQ was initially at Esquay-sur-Seulles, then established at Cully next day. A mixed party under the second-in-command was still carrying out reconnaissance and clearing battery positions on 26 June when the division was committed to its first action in the Battle of the Odon (Operation Epsom).

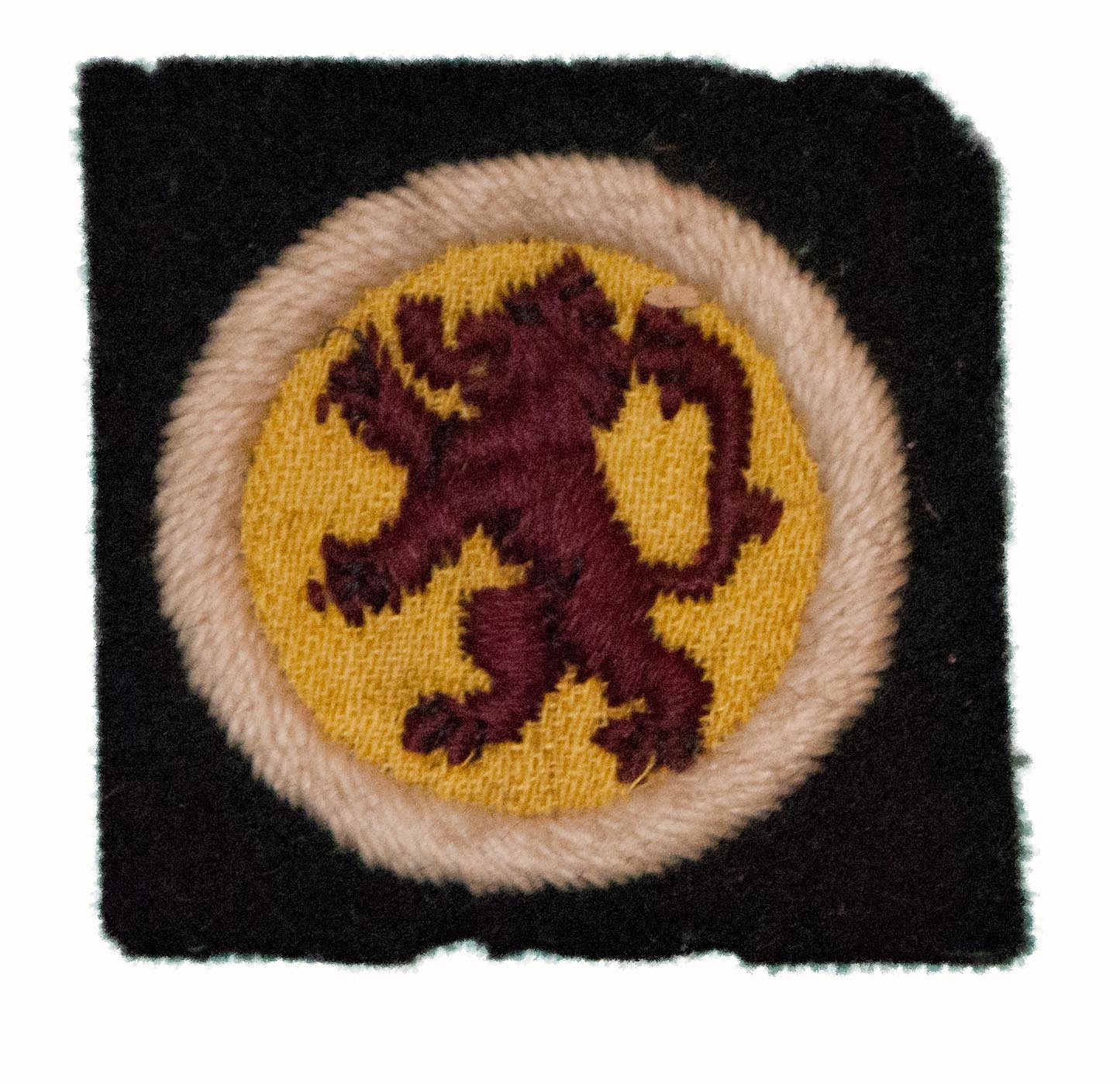
Shoulder patch worn by the 15th (Scottish) Division.

After the weather delay, Second Army began the 'Epsom' offensive on 25 June, with VIII Corps (including 15th (S) Division) attacking at 07.30 next day to force crossings of the Rivers Orne and Odon. The infantry attacked through fields of crops with tank support behind a Creeping barrage and fought their way into the villages of Cheux and St Manvieu but the Odon bridges were still 2 miles (3.2 km) away at the end of the first day. The party of 119th LAA Rgt preparing positions had been caught by mortar fire, losing one man killed and one officer and three other ranks (ORs) wounded. RHQ moved up to Putot-en-Bessin. Further gains and a narrow bridgehead over the Odon were achieved by bitter fighting next day, by the end of which 15th (S) Division had created a deep salient into the German positions (known as 'Scottish Corridor') without reaching the Orne. Over following days the Germans made repeated attempts to overwhelm the corridor. On 28 June B Trp had to fight as infantry to deal with snipers, killing three and capturing another. On that day a self-propelled (SP) Bofors of G Trp received a direct hit from a mortar with three ORs killed and one wounded. During one attack at Cheux on 29 June, the regiment's forward subunit had to withdraw to the British anti-tank lines, returning to its previous position next day after the attack had been broken by British artillery.

On 30 June guns from the regiment hit a Messerschmitt Bf 109 (Me 109), which was believed to have crashed. One role for frontline LAA units was to provide 'refuge strips' for air observation post (AOP) aircraft spotting for the field guns: a Bofors troop deployed with Local Warning (LW) radar and ground observers could alert the pilot to the presence of enemy aircraft and provide protection for him. Two Trps of 392 Bty moved forward in this role on 30 June. Ultimately the Germans could not take the pounding from concentrated Allied firepower and had to stop their attacks. However, Operation Epsom caused a quarter of all the casualties suffered by 15th (S) Division in the North West Europe campaign. Casualties were understandably much lighter for the LAA regiment, which was only marginally involved. Nonetheless, between 27 June and 2 July 119th LAA suffered casualties of 1 officer and 4 other ranks (ORs) killed, 1 officer and 5 ORs wounded.

For the next two months the division fought its way slowly through the Bocage country, capturing Éterville, retaking Gavrus and advancing to Évrecy in Operations Jupiter and Greenline. Since the Allies had achieved air superiority over the beachhead, there was little call for AA defence, and AA units became increasingly used to supplement the divisional artillery to support ground operations. LAA units fired tracer to guide night attacks onto their objectives, and the Bofors guns were much in demand for infantry support. They could give useful close-range fire to help infantry working from cover to cover in the bocage; their rapid fire was good for suppressing enemy heavy weapons, the 40 mm round's sensitive percussion fuze providing an airburst effect among trees. It was also used for 'bunker-busting', though the lack of protection made the gun detachment vulnerable to return fire.

German mortar fire was a particular hazard in the bocage, and 119th LAA Rgt's CO, Lt-Col 'Sailor' Young, was instrumental in setting up a divisional counter-mortar (CM) organisation based initially on the guns of 119th LAA and the communications and 4.2-inch mortars of the divisional machine-gun battalion, 1st Bn Middlesex Regiment, later widened to include other artillery. When incoming fire was received the CM group brought down immediate heavy retaliation against suspected German mortar positions.

119th LAA Regiment spent mid-July with the divisional artillery in the St Manvieu area, occasionally under shellfire, while it practised the CM scheme and the last parts of the regiment arrived from England. On 11 July A Trp shot down two Me 109s near Verson. On 23 July 15th (S) Division was moved westwards to take part in Operation Bluecoat, aiming to strike southwards from Caumont towards Vire. The attack was launched on 30 July and made good progress, getting onto the Estry and Perrier Ridges to support the advancing armour. 119th LAA Regiment suffered three killed and nine wounded in a clash with an enemy patrol on 1 August. Later, on 6 August, the division supported 43rd (Wessex) Division's seizure of Mont Pinçon.

21st Army Group's manpower shortage and the lack of German aircraft activity led to the divisional LAA regiments being reduced. On 5 August 119th LAA Rgt had to send 54 ORs to a reinforcement holding unit, then it was ordered to send the 20 mm troops (X, Y and Z) and one Bofors troop from each battery (B, D and H) back to England. This left each battery with just two troops of Bofors guns, one towed, one SP.

=== North West Europe ===
The breakout from the Normandy beachhead had now been achieved, and after the German forces trapped in the Falaise Pocket had been dealt with, 21st Army Group was able to drive east towards the River Seine. 15th (S) Division spearheaded XII Corps' advance, 'Operation Gallop', with one troop of 119th LAA Rgt attached to cover each infantry brigade, the divisional artillery, and divisional HQ along the column. The regiment also had C Trp of 364 Bty and G Trp of 366 Bty from 112th (Durham Light Infantry) LAA Rgt (the corps LAA regiment) attached to it for this operation to cover 67th (Suffolk) Medium Rgt and the field regiment attached to 4th Armoured Bde. Driving from east of Falaise through Beaumont-le-Roger the column reached the river at Louviers on 27 August. Despite the risks inherent in attacking in daylight, 15th (S) Division pushed its first troops across at 19.00 before German defences could solidify in the far bank. The attack was covered by Bofors guns firing at ground targets across the river, and after dark the bridging operation on the river was illuminated by B Trp of 344 Searchlight Bty operating in a 'Moonlight Battery' role under command of 119th LAA Rgt. The division then held the bridgehead while the rest of the corps rushed on to the River Somme. Responsibility for AA defence of the packed road columns passing through the bridgehead remained with 119th LAA Rgt, but despite ideal cloud conditions for surprise attacks by fighter bombers there was no interference from the Luftwaffe. This responsibility was passed over to 73rd LAA Rgt of 80th AA Bde.

On 1 September the regiment was ordered to increase its petrol reserves in preparation for a long move. The batteries were allocated to the various sections of the divisional column:

- 390 Bty Tactical HQ with A and C Trps attached to 181st Field Rgt (44th (Lowland) Brigade Group)
- 391 Bty Tac HQ with E and F Trps attached to 131st (Lowland – City of Glasgow) Fd Rgt (227th (Highland) Bde Group)
- 392 Bty Tac HQ with I Trp attached to 190th Fd Rgt (46th (Highland) Bde Group)
- G Trp with regimental B Echelon attached to Divisional HQ

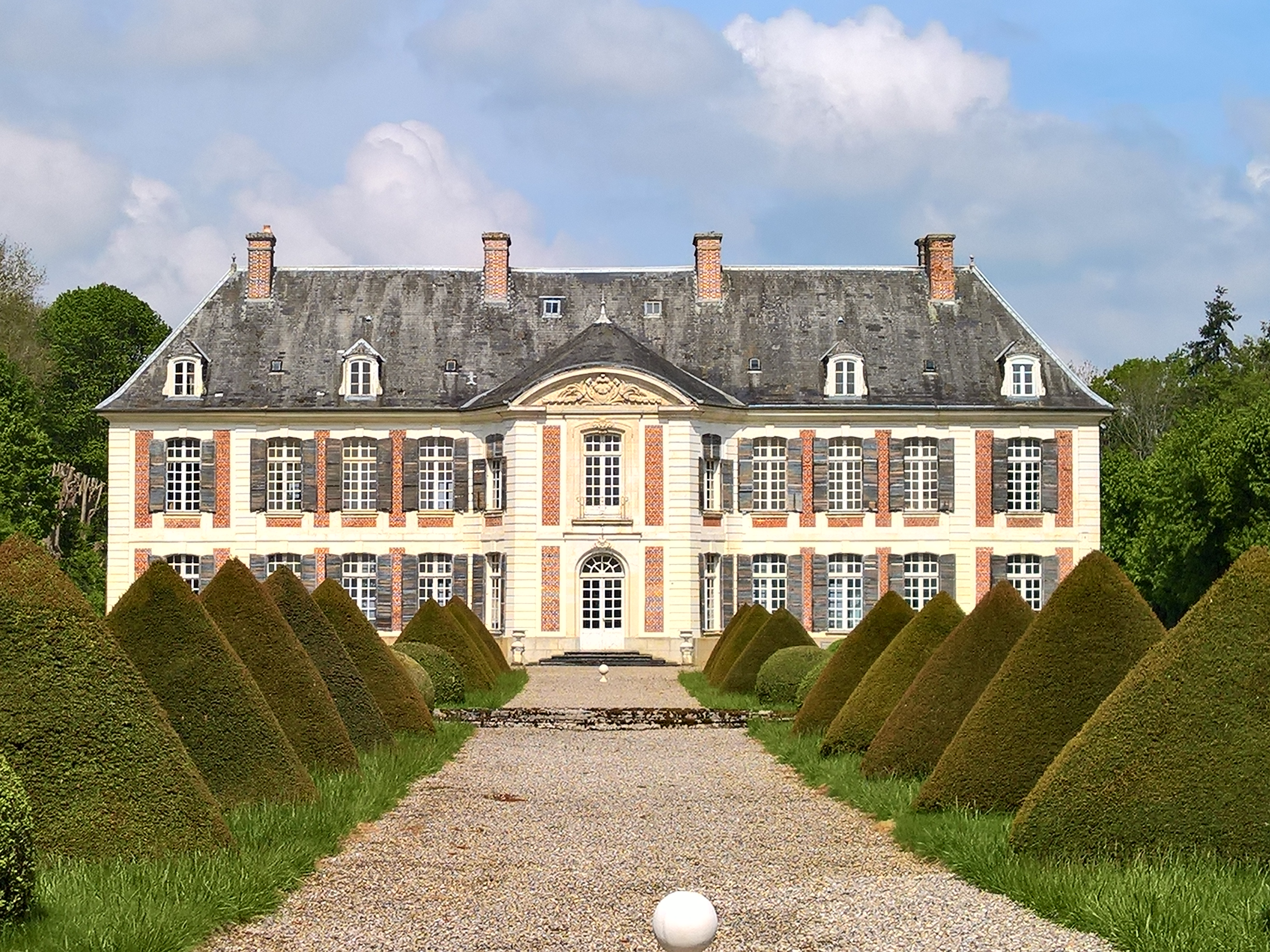
The Chateau de Selincourt, where 119th LAA Rgt was 'grounded' for a few days.

The move began on 3 September, with 15th (S) Division starting a 120 miles (190 km) journey to take over defence of the Somme bridgeheads. 2nd Tactical Air Force (2nd TAF) was overhead, so AA fire was prohibited during daylight. By the end of 4 September 119th LAA Rgt was concentrated in the grounds of the Chateau de Selincourt, near Hornoy-le-Bourg, west of Amiens, where it was 'grounded' and most of its vehicles (23 3-tonner trucks and 10 gun tractors) used to provide a supply transport column, while a 40-man detachment with wireless-equipped light vehicles was employed on traffic control.

The rest of the division continued through Lille, sweeping the country, dealing with rearguards and rounding up prisoners, until it reached the Albert Canal on 9 September. From that night all AA fire was forbidden because of an expected airborne operation, but this was cancelled on 12 September. Next day the regiment's vehicles returned and it began the long drive to catch up, after which the guns were deployed to protect the artillery, with a few ready for ground fire across the canal (though no targets presented themselves). The division then moved to hold the Gheel bridgehead across the Meuse–Escaut canal; here there were numerous targets for ground firing, including enemy machine gun nests and observation posts, and in support of infantry attacks. For a night operation by 227th Bde, E Trp used the tracer of its Bofors to direct the attack. On 17 September the regiment laid out fluorescent strips to mark its positions when the Allied aircraft carrying I Airborne Corps flew over to launch Operation Market Garden.

15th (S) Division's role in Market Garden was to hold the Gheel bridgehead and then advance in parallel with XXX Corps' main thrust. The division advanced towards Eindhoven on 21 September, with 119th LAA Rgt's three SP Trps accompanying for ground fire, while the tractor-drawn Trps protected bridges along the route. It took the division several days to get across the Junction Canal at Aart, and eventually it adopted an easier route as it moved up the western flank of XXX Corps' narrow thrust. It took five days' hard fighting to capture Best, but by 27 September 119th LAA Rgt was guarding the bridge over the Wilhelmina Canal at Son, having suffered its first battle casualties since Normandy. It periodically exchanged fire with German positions at 1,200 yards (1,100 m), employing both direct and indirect (observed) fire. By 4 October the exhausted division had been relieved and 119th LAA Rgt was resting at Gemert.

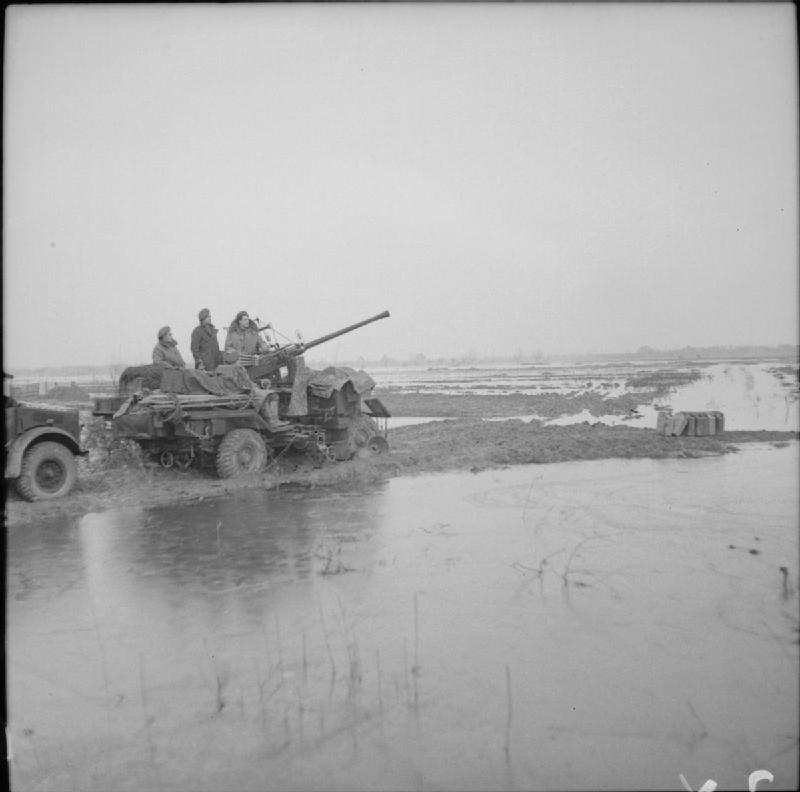
SP Bofors in Holland, December 1944.

The division was back in the line on 22 October for Operation Pheasant, advancing towards Tilburg against little opposition, held up only by rearguards and broken bridges, with guns of 119th LAA Rgt engaging ground targets. The town was liberated on 28 October. Next day, 119th LAA Rgt was in Helmond when it engaged enemy aircraft after dark, being bombed in its turn, with damage to several vehicles. The division was then switched to help deal with a German counter-attack at Meijel. It relieved the 7th US Armored Division and 25th Field Regiment, RA, which had been fighting desperately at Asten, and then counter-attacked, with 119th LAA Rgt contributing ground fire. While three troops were thus engaged, the other three troops providing AA defence for the divisional artillery were joined by three troops from 112th (DLI) LAA Rgt. They were linked to a GL Mk II gun-laying radar (normally Heavy AA equipment) so that the AA Operations Room (AAOR) could order pre-arranged AA barrages and improve the LAA's effectiveness at night. Seven troops of 119th and 112th LAA Rgts were ordered to provide harassing fire in support of an attack by 227th Bde on 16 November, but the Germans had pulled out of Meijel. The regiment suffered a number of casualties from schu-mines.

The division next fought its way over the bleak moorlands of De Peel to close up to the River Maas in Operation Nutcracker (19–27 November). 119th LAA Regiment was engaged in ground fire against enemy observation posts (OPs), harassing fire, and occasional AA fire against fighter-bombers. It received a few reinforcements from the division's anti-tank regiment (97th A/T Rgt), which was being disbanded, but these men were quickly removed and sent for infantry training. Next, the division carried out a set-piece assault on the German bridgehead at Blerick in Operation Guildford (3 December), with massive support by guns of every calibre. For 119th LAA Rgt the fire programme began on 2 December when the guns were registered with the help of an AOP aircraft on likely enemy supply routes that would be subjected to harassing fire. The regiment also had one gun from a super heavy regiment attached to it to deal with a tower that was a probable enemy OP, and destroyed it with 7–8 rounds. When the attack went in on 3 December the ground firing troops continued the fireplan until they ran out of ammunition, suffering six casualties from return fire. They then returned to the AA lines.

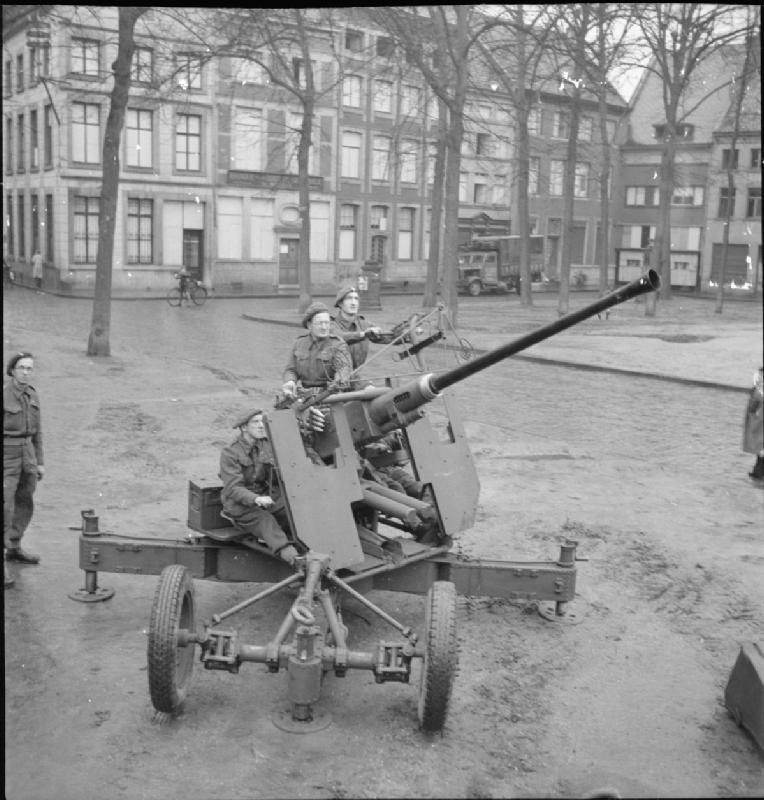
Bofors gun deployed in North West Europe, 1944.

15th (Scottish) Division spent the winter along the Maas as operations went on elsewhere. 119th LAA Regiment's batteries adopted a routine of two weeks in the line followed by one week in maintenance and training, mirroring the brigades to which they were attached. While in the line one trp per battery was giving LAA protection to the field gun areas, while one was at divisional HQ, and one in readiness for groundshooting tasks. The regiment was forced to give up a draft of 32 younger men to be retrained as infantry. Meanwhile, the Luftwaffe was active with fighter-bombers and reconnaissance aircraft in twos and threes, and there were several LAA engagements. When the Luftwaffe launched its Operation Bodenplatte against Allied airfields on 1 January 1945, GHQ AA Troops for 21st Army Group reported that '40 mm LAA had the time of its life'. 119th LAA Regiment claimed six of the low-flying Fighter-bombers shot down during the morning. The new divisional A/T Rgt, 102nd (Northumberland Hussars), confirmed that three of these had landed near its HQ (later VIII Corps confirmed five 'kills' and one shared). Otherwise the regiment was engaged in occasional ground fire against houses and enemy SP guns, or to test repaired guns. Between 19 and 28 January 15th (S) Division was relieved and went back to Tilburg for training.

=== Germany ===
15th (Scottish) Division was next engaged in the fighting in the Reichswald (Operation Veritable). The plan was for C Trp to take part in the 'Pepperpot', in which LAA and A/T guns and machine guns mortars of all calibres saturated the enemy positions in front of the assaulting infantry, while the rest of the regiment's guns carried out AA tasks for both 15th (S) and Guards Armoured Divisions (the guns of the latter's 94th LAA Rgt all being involved in the pepperpot). 119th LAA Regiment was also given a role in traffic control at the six gaps the division was to create in the Siegfried Line obstacles. Armoured cars of 15th (S) Reconnaissance Regiment, supported by Churchill tanks, would establish the six sector control points and a regulating HQ, then teams from 119th LAA Rgt in wireless-equipped Jeeps would take over when the fighting had moved on. The system worked reasonably well, even though the Armoured Vehicles Royal Engineers were unable to complete all the gaps. The fireplan was changed at the last minute, and all of 119th LAA Rgt's guns were made available for the divisional pepperpot under 1st Middlesex, though the mud made it impossible to redeploy the tractor-towed Bofors guns in time. XXX Corps launched its attack at 05.00 on 8 February, and in the afternoon four SP guns of C Trp tried to move up with 44th Bde to give directional fire indicating gaps in the minefields with their tracer, but they were bogged in the mud, as were many of the supporting tanks. By 15 February XXX Corps was through Kleve and the three SP trps moved up to protect the deployment of 15th (S) Division's artillery beyond the town while the rest of the regiment organised the movement of the artillery. Between 17 and 24 February the regiment commanded several pepperpots in support of the division's attacks on Goch and Schloss Calbeck, and generally engaged in ground fire. On 21 February there was fine weather and the Luftwaffe made appearances in daylight and by moonlight; the regiment claimed several hits and one aircraft destroyed. The division was then relieved on 24 February as other formations completed the advance to the banks of the Rhine.

By this stage of the war divisional LAA regiments had begun receiving quadruple 0.5-inch Browning machine guns on SP mountings (the M51 Quadmount) in place of a proportion of their Bofors guns, to improve their capability against 'snap' attacks by the new German jet fighter-bombers. Under this arrangement a troop comprised four SP or towed Bofors and two quadruple SP Brownings.

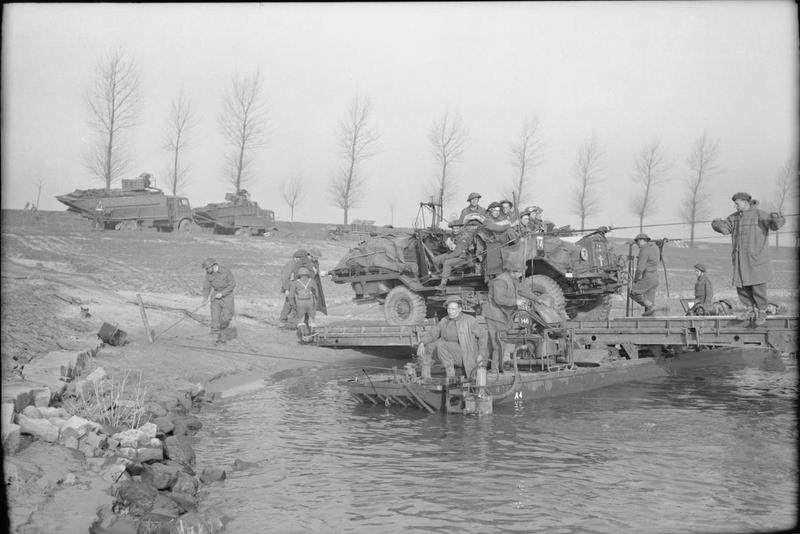
SP Bofors of 119th LAA Regiment crossing the Rhine near Xanten, March 1945.

Second Army then made preparations to cross the Rhine in Operation Plunder. 15th (Scottish) Division was tasked with making the initial assault crossing on XII Corps' front (Operation Torchlight). The vast build-up of forces, ammunition and supply dumps was a major AA defence task. Defending the bridgeheads after the crossing was another vital task, so getting AA units across early was crucial. 119th LAA Rgt practised loading SP Bofors guns onto Class 9 rafts, which 15th (Kent) GHQ Troops Royal Engineers would operate until Bailey bridges could be erected across the wide river. Other gunners and equipment would cross in Buffaloes. While the assault was going on, the regiment was organised with three Trps (and 9 attached guns of 108th LAA Rgt from 52nd (Lowland) Infantry Division, the follow-up division) taking part in pepperpot bombardments of the far bank, one and a half Trps to give directional fire for the various craft crossing the river in darkness, and the remaining one and a half Trps giving AA cover to the medium and heavy guns of 3rd Army Group Royal Artillery. The guns moved into concealed positions on 22 and 23 March. When the operation was launched on the night of 23/4 March the regiment fired 1347 rounds in the pepperpots, and their red tracer was prominent when 15th (Scottish) Division's infantry set off across the river in stormboats and Buffaloes at 02.00. The infantry soon gained a footing for the bridgehead. The Sappers then began rafting across guns and vehicles, with LAA guns given a high priority. It was not until after dark on 24 March that small numbers of Luftwaffe aircraft appeared, making dive-bombing attacks from medium and low altitude, which were countered by searchlights and LAA guns. On 25 March 119th LAA Rgt sent C, E and G Trps (without guns or vehicles) across in Buffaloes to act as infantry to protect the bridge-building operations from any stray enemy hiding in the adjacent woods. Over the next two nights the number of air raids increased but the first bridges were operational on 25 March and the follow-up divisions began crossing. By now the raiders were forced to bomb from greater heights by the radar-controlled LAA barrages they faced. On 28 March a few fighter-bombers were seen by daylight in XII Corps' area, but thereafter the Rhine crossings remained quiet as the Luftwaffe had to fall back ahead of Second Army's advance. During 27 March the rest of the regiment, HQs and transport crossed the river, and next day E and G Trps were engaged in heavy ground firing in support of attacks by 44th (H) and 227th (H) Bdes, targets including a church tower that could have been used as an enemy OP. On 29 March the division was relieved and 119th LAA Rgt 'harboured' in the Bislicher Wald near Hamminkeln.

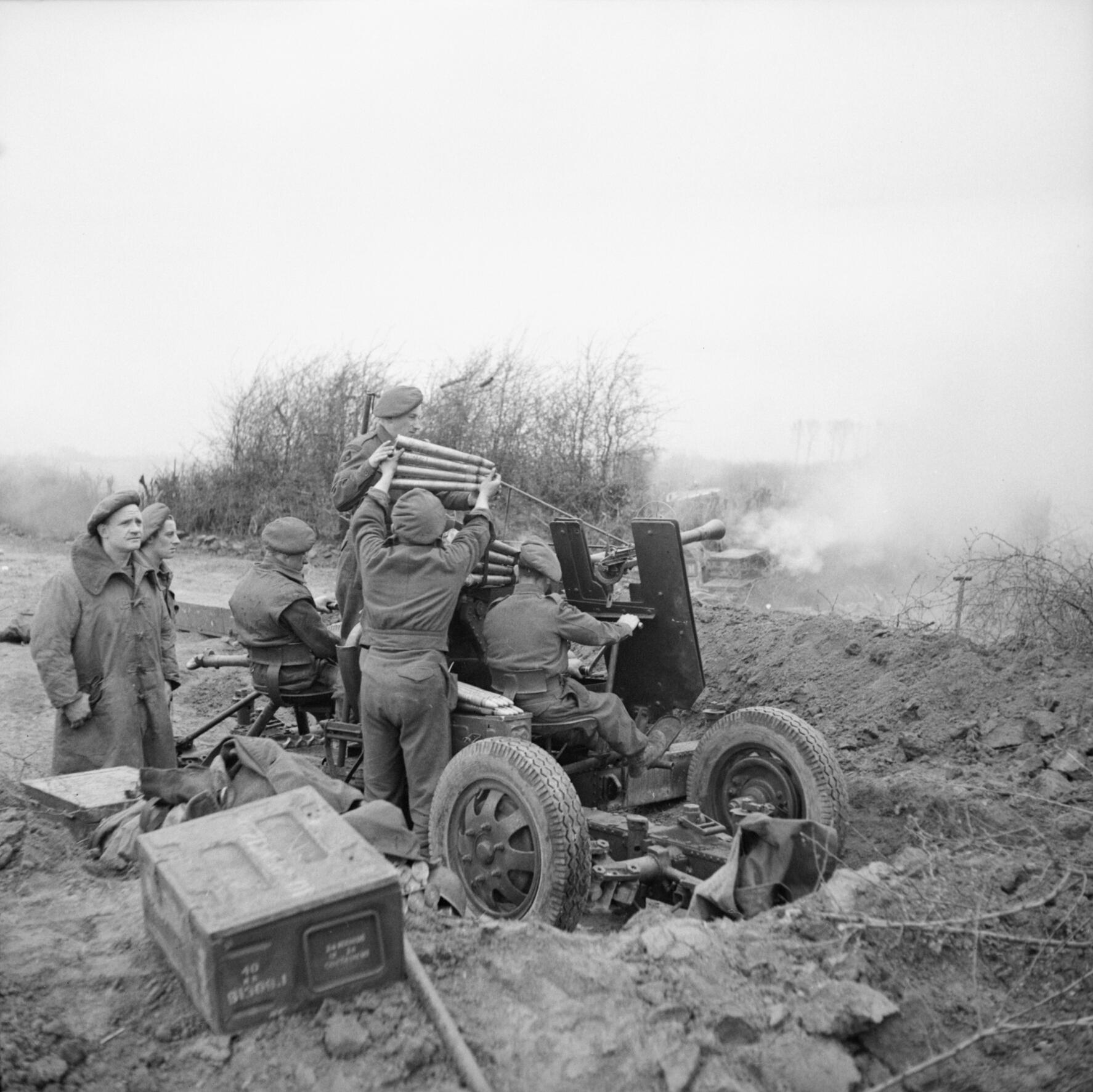
Bofors gun in the ground support role east of the Rhine, 26 March 1945.

After rest, 15th (S) Division was called forward on 5 April to rejoin 21st Army Group's drive across northern Germany. 119th LAA Regiment advanced with the field artillery, while F and I Trps deployed in a combined LAA/infantry role to protect the bridges across the River Ems and the Dortmund–Ems Canal. Over the following days the two troops moved forward from one bridge to the next, while the rest of the regiment protected the artillery and Divisional HQ, primarily in the ground defence role but with occasional 'crash action' AA engagements against Messerschmitt Me 262 jets. On 11 April the division passed through 6th Airborne Division to occupy Celle and Uelzen, held up only by demolition parties until they met a strong rearguard at Uelzen and were counter-attacked at Stadensen. 119th LAA Regiment flushed a number of Germans out of the woods. On 17 April the infantry infiltrated into Uelzen, and two days later the division was heading for the River Elbe, though Luftwaffe aircraft were active: 390 Bty shot down a Focke-Wulf Fw 190 on 19 April, and C and E Trps shot down another on 20 April and captured the pilot who had baled out wounded. On 21 April the division had closed up to the river and prepared to cross. The regiment shot down another Fw 190 on 26 April.

The crossing of the Elbe (Operation Enterprise) was 21st Army Group's last major action of the war. 15th (Scottish) Division carried it out at Artlenburg with Buffaloes and stormboats, covered by a massive bombardment including the Bofors guns participating in pepperpots and directional tracer fire. Opposition was patchy, and bridging operations began once the bridgehead had been secured. The Luftwaffe attempted to attack this work by bombing through breaks in the cloud, the attacks peaking on 29 April, when jets attacked the bridges on several occasions, but were mainly dealt with by Allied fighters and the LAA guns: F and G Trps each claimed one 'kill' on 30 April, and another came down over divisional HQ having been engaged by four troops.

On 1 May the division began clearing the Sachsenwald, which mainly involved dealing with rearguards and rounding up prisoners. The regiment crossed the Elbe on 2 May, engaging a number of Luftwaffe fighters, though by that time local German officers were discussing surrender terms. On 4 May came the German surrender at Lüneburg Heath. 15th (Scottish) Division immediately began occupation duties in and around Kiel, dealing with prisoners and refugees. The divisional artillery was made responsible for the Kreis Stormarn district, with 119th LAA Rgt at Hammoor. A number of divisional artillery regiments including 119th LAA sent drivers back to Nijmegen to pick up 3-tonner lorries to act as divisional transport while the division's own Royal Army Service Corps companies were engaged in transporting German prisoners to help bring in the harvest. At the end of the month the regiment moved to Ratzeburg.

Demobilisation began in the autumn: 119th Light Anti-Aircraft Regiment was one of the first divisional units to be disbanded, on 31 October 1945. During the NW Europe campaign it had suffered battle casualties (major actions only) of 2 officers killed, 3 wounded, 12 ORs killed and 29 wounded.
