= 221st Independent Infantry Brigade (Home) =

- Active: 8 November 1940 – 22 November 1941
- Country: United Kingdom
- Branch: British Army
- Type: Infantry Brigade
- Role: Training and Home Defence

The 221st Independent Infantry Brigade (Home) was a short-lived Home Defence formation of the British Army during the Second World War.

== Origin and Service ==
The 221st Independent Infantry Brigade (Home) was formed for service in the United Kingdom under the Chatham Area headquarters of Home Forces on 8 November 1940. It was commanded by Brigadier C.H. Gotto, and comprised three newly raised infantry battalions After a brief spell attached to the 2nd Infantry Division, the Brigade became part of the Yorkshire County Division (later East Riding Coastal Area) on 19 March 1941. The brigade was disbanded on 22 December 1941.

== Order of battle ==
The composition of 221 Brigade was as follows:

- 11th Battalion, Gloucestershire Regiment (8 November – 11 December 1941, converted early 1942 into the 118th Light Anti-Aircraft Regiment, Royal Artillery)
- 10th Battalion, Queen's Own Royal West Kent Regiment (8 November – 11 December 1941, converted early 1942 into the 119th Light Anti-Aircraft Regiment, Royal Artillery)
- 7th Battalion, King's Shropshire Light Infantry (8 November 1940 – 29 November 1941, converted that year into the 99th Anti-Tank Regiment, Royal Artillery)
