= Brunswick–Uelzen railway =

Railway line in Germany

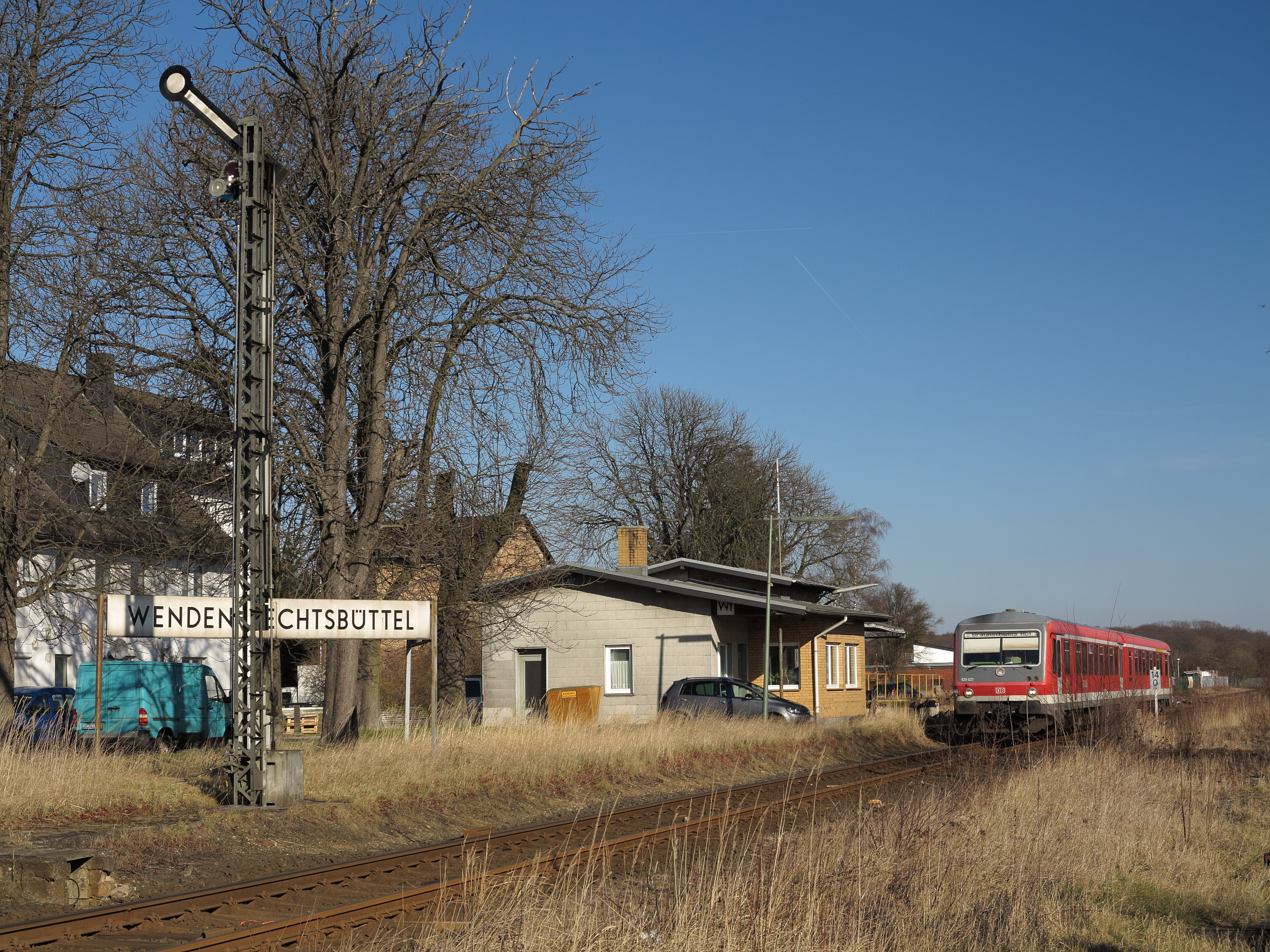
- Brunswick–Uelzen railway

Overview
- Line number: 1902 (Brunswick–Gifhorn); 1962 (Gifhorn–Wieren)
- Locale: Lower Saxony, Germany

Service
- Route number: 115

Technical
- Line length: 87 km (54 mi)

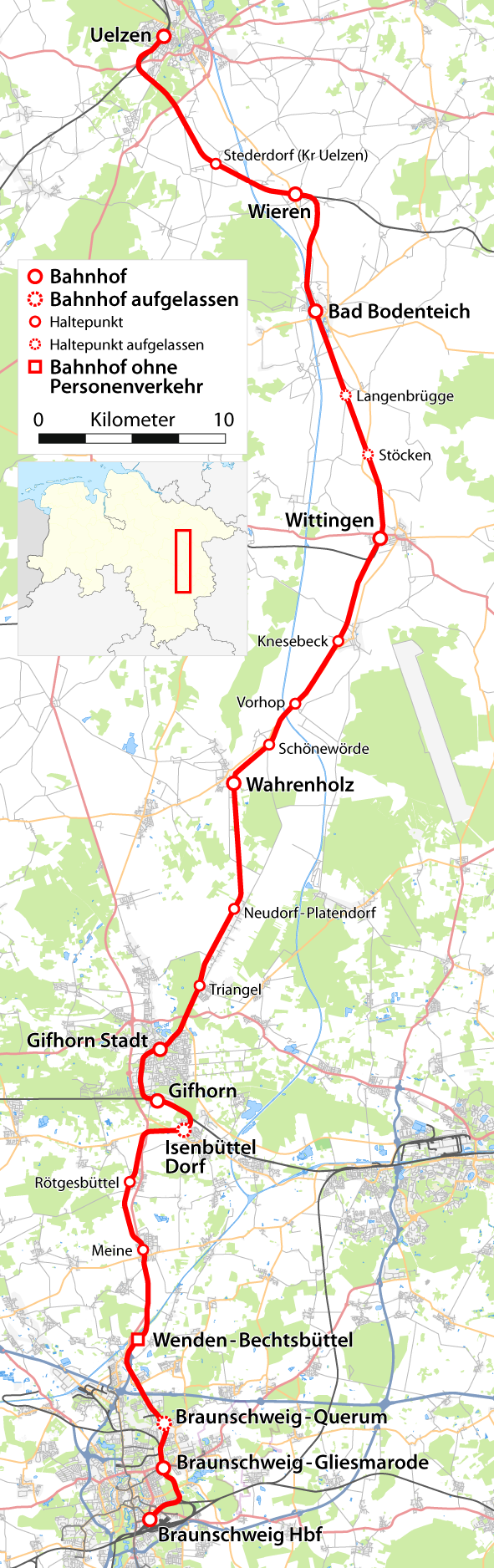
Course of timetable route 115 Brunswick–Uelzen

The Brunswick–Uelzen railway line is a largely, single-tracked, non-electrified branch line in the north German state of Lower Saxony. It serves the northern part of Brunswick Land and the eastern region of the Lüneburg Heath. The most important station en route is Gifhorn. The line has also been called the Mühlenbahn ("Mill Railway") for several years due to the many mills along its route.

== Course ==
The line runs from Braunschweig Hauptbahnhof to the north, bridges the Mittelland Canal and crosses the Hanover–Wolfsburg line (part of the Hanover–Berlin high-speed railway), in Gifhorn (old station name: Isenbüttel-Gifhorn). It then traverses Gifhorn district and the eastern part of the Lüneburg Heath, and reaches Wieren after passing through Wittingen, where there is a junction to the East Hanoverian Railways network, and Bad Bodenteich. At Wieren it merges into the electrified Stendal–Uelzen railway, the eastern section of the America Line, sharing its trackbed to Uelzen.

The Brunswick–Uelzen railway is the shortest link from Brunswick, Salzgitter and Wolfsburg to the north. Because it not been significantly upgraded, however, (maximum speeds on the line up to 80 km/h), routes via Lehrte are much faster.

Running roughly parallel to the railway, but at distance of a few kilometres, are the Elbe Lateral Canal, which is crossed twice, the B 4 federal road and the planned route of the A 39 motorway.

== History ==
The railway was taken into service shortly before the end of the 19th century. Since then it has been regularly worked by passenger trains. The first train ran on 1 March 1889, when the line was cleared for goods traffic from Isenbüttel-Gifhorn to Meine, and the first passenger train on the line ran on 1 July 1890. North of Isenbüttel-Gifhorn the next section to Triangel was opened to goods traffic on 1 May 1889 and passenger services on 1 November 1889. Both sections of the route were initially operated by the Berlin-Lehrte Railway Company. The southern link to Brunswick was opened on 1 July 1894 and the northern line to Uelzen on 1 September 1900.

Until 1913 trains from Brunswick ran from the west into the old station of Isenbüttel-Gifhorn. There they had to continue to Uelzen in order to change direction. Following an extensive relaying of the track, from 1913 trains could approach the station from the east which shortened journey times.

During the Second World War there were two serious accidents at Isenbüttel-Gifhorn station. Both were collisions in which two trains were involved. On 22 January 1941 a train ran into a military transport with about 1,000 Belgian prisoners-of-war. As a result, over 120 passengers lost their lives. On 11 October 1944 nine people died in another accident and 15 were seriously injured.

A photograph of Triangel station near Neudorf-Platendorf graces the dust jacket of the first edition of Bernward Vesper's short novel, The Reise ("The Journey", 1977).

In the 1970s, so-called Heckeneilzuge ("hedgerow semi-fast trains") worked the line. These were Eilzug trains than ran on secondary routes rather than main lines. For example, in 1975 there were pairs of trains on the Flensburg–Lübeck–Wittingen–Kreiensen and Hamburg–Wittingen–Goslar–Kreiensen routes. Today there are almost no goods trains on the line. To about 1994 there was a siding in Meine to the old sugar factory, that was frequently used by goods trains during the sugar beet season, but in the 1970s was taken out of service.

In early 2008 the urban level crossings in Meine were replaced and the bridge over the Midland Canal near Bechtsbüttel renovated.

Several regional services on the Brunswick–Bremen route operated until December 2008 over the Brunswick–Wieren railway and the America line. A regional service once again connected Brunswick with Bremen over this route in 2010 and 2011. This tradition came to an end temporarily with the takeover of local traffic on the Uelzen–Bremen line by erixx GmbH in December 2011.

The tracks on the Bad Bodenteich–Wieren section were relaid in July 2011 on a ten-kilometre section from Vorhop towards Neudorf-Platendorf via Wahrenholz in the autumn of 2012. At the same time, the freight tracks in Wahrenholz station were dismantled (this part of the station was formerly called the Ölbf., "oil station", as it was used for the loading of oil from the town’s two oil wells). The renewal of the tracks between Vorhop and Stöcken followed in 2013, with the simultaneous upgrading of all sets of points on the former freight tracks of Wittingen station. In addition, the points for the crossing loop in Bad Bodenteich and the entire length of track 2 including the sets of points in Gifhorn Stadt were renewed. In 2014, the track was renewed between Stöcken and Bad Bodenteich, where it connects with the subsequently constructed island platform, which enables the crossings of the few trains that have run hourly since December 2014. Platform 1, next to the station building, which had been dismantled at the time of the "hedgerow semi-fast trains," was rebuilt. The platforms were adapted in whole or in part to the entry height of the new railcars in the stations of Gifhorn Stadt, Neudorf-Platendorf, Wahrenholz and Knesebeck.

A new island platform was installed in Wittingen station in 2017 and the old platform 1 was dismantled at the same time. Platforms 1 and 2 in Gifhorn Stadt were completely renewed in their previous location and at the same time the station forecourt was enlarged with the installation of a bus station and extra parking.

== Current services ==
Until December 2014, Regionalbahn trains operated by DB Regio provided passenger services more-or-less every 2 hours, usually using Class 628 diesel multiple units. The timetable was unappealing because of the two-hourly cycle and the early last service. Thus, on Mondays to Fridays only eleven train pairs ran between Brunswick and Gifhorn and the last regional train left Brunswick about 19:37 towards Gifhorn. Since December 2014, the line has been operated by the erixx railway company based in Soltau with Lint 54 railcars. With the exception of a later evening connection from Brunswick to Wittingen, the extension of another late-evening service to Uelzen from Fridays to Sundays, a late connection on Sunday from Brunswick to Wittingen and two improved early connections between Uelzen and Gifhorn, the range of services has not yet improved dramatically as some connections that did not conform to the regular-interval pattern have also been dropped.

Freight traffic still operates from and to Knesebeck (timber loading, a siding to the firm of Butting), from and to the port of Wittingen as well as south of Braunschweig-Gliesmarode.

In places the line needs to be upgraded. There are sometimes traffic jams at the level crossings near Meine (federal route 4) and Ausbüttel due to defective barriers. In these situations, the police have to react quickly to direct the traffic manually.

Very occasionally the line is used by museum railways.

== Planning ==
It was intended that the section of line between Gifhorn Stadt and Brunswick would constitute part of a new Brunswick RegioStadtBahn. Several stations and halts would have been rebuilt and the number of trains on this line would have been increased to match the more frequent intervals of the RegioStadtBahn. In another stage of the project, RegioStadtBahn services would have also been extended over the line to Uelzen. The entire project was originally intended to be completed by 2014. The project failed in 2010, because significantly increased vehicle procurement costs meant that it was no longer economically viable. In order to be able to increase the attractiveness of the regional train services even without the RegionalStadtBahn, the Zweckverband Großraum Braunschweig (Greater Brunswick Municipal Association, ZGB) developed the Regionalbahnkonzept 2014+ concept. This provides for new rolling stock and an hourly service on the Brunswick–Uelzen line. In addition, connections between the Stadtbahn and the Regionalbahn in Braunschweig-Gliesmarode would be improved. In the long term, a half-hourly service would be provided between Brunswick and Gifhorn Stadt. The infrastructure would have to be upgraded to handle the increased number of services. In the area of Rötgesbüttel, for example, a second track is to be built so that the trains can cross every hour. The infrastructure was originally planned to be upgraded by 2016. Only then could rail services operate at a regular hourly rate. In addition to the infrastructure upgrade being unfinished, the financing of additional rolling stock has not been resolved.

== Stock ==
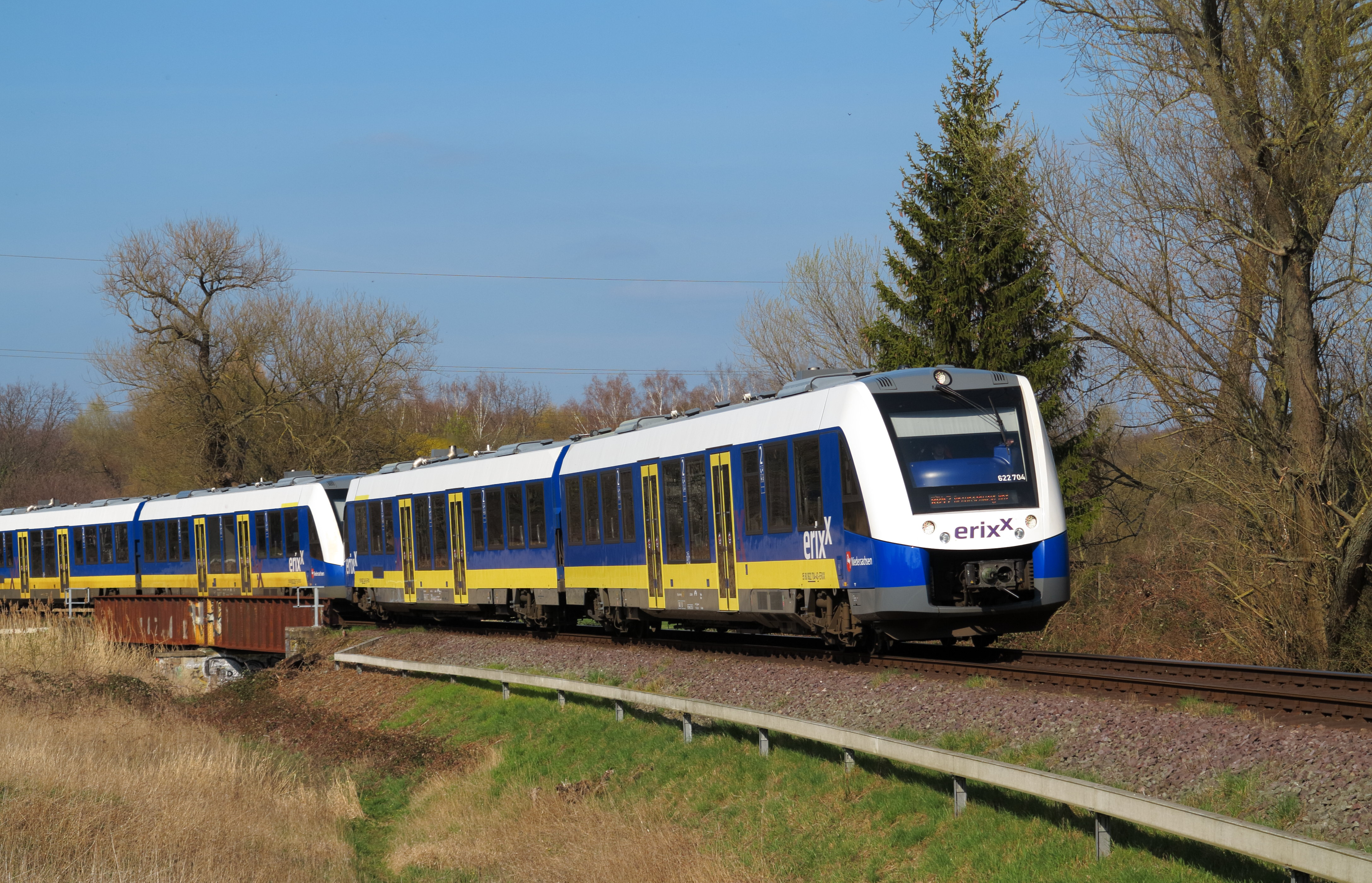
Class LINT 54 multiple unit near Brunswick

During the steam locomotive era, classes 03, 38, 50, 55, 57 and 64 among others were operated. In the 1930s, there were also apparent benefits from using accumulator railcar ETA 177. In the 1970s, passenger service were operated with two-engine Uerdingen railbuses (class VT 98.9) and class 628.0 and 614 diesel multiple units and the hedgerow semi-fast trains were hauled by class V 200.0 locomotives. The operation was successively operated with classes 634, 613 and 515 sets until the operation was switched to Silberling carriages hauled by locomotives.

For a long time passenger trains hauled by DB Class 218 diesel locomotives dominated the scene. They ran with driving coaches for the first time in the 2002/03 timetable. In 2003, this chapter in passenger train history came to an end. Since then trains running between Brunswick and Uelzen have been made up almost exclusively of DB Class 628 multiple units. Until December 2008 some trains were provided by Class 614s. Since December 2014, erixx GmbH has operated LINT 54 sets.

In freight traffic in the post-steam period, locomotive of classes V 60 and 212 and, between 1999 and 2014, diesel locomotives of Verkehrsbetriebe Peine-Salzgitter could be observed. Today, freight transport is hauled by locomotives of class 294 and 261 (Voith Gravita) and south of Braunschweig-Watenbüttel by locomotives of the Osthannoversche Eisenbahnen (OHE).

== Photographs ==
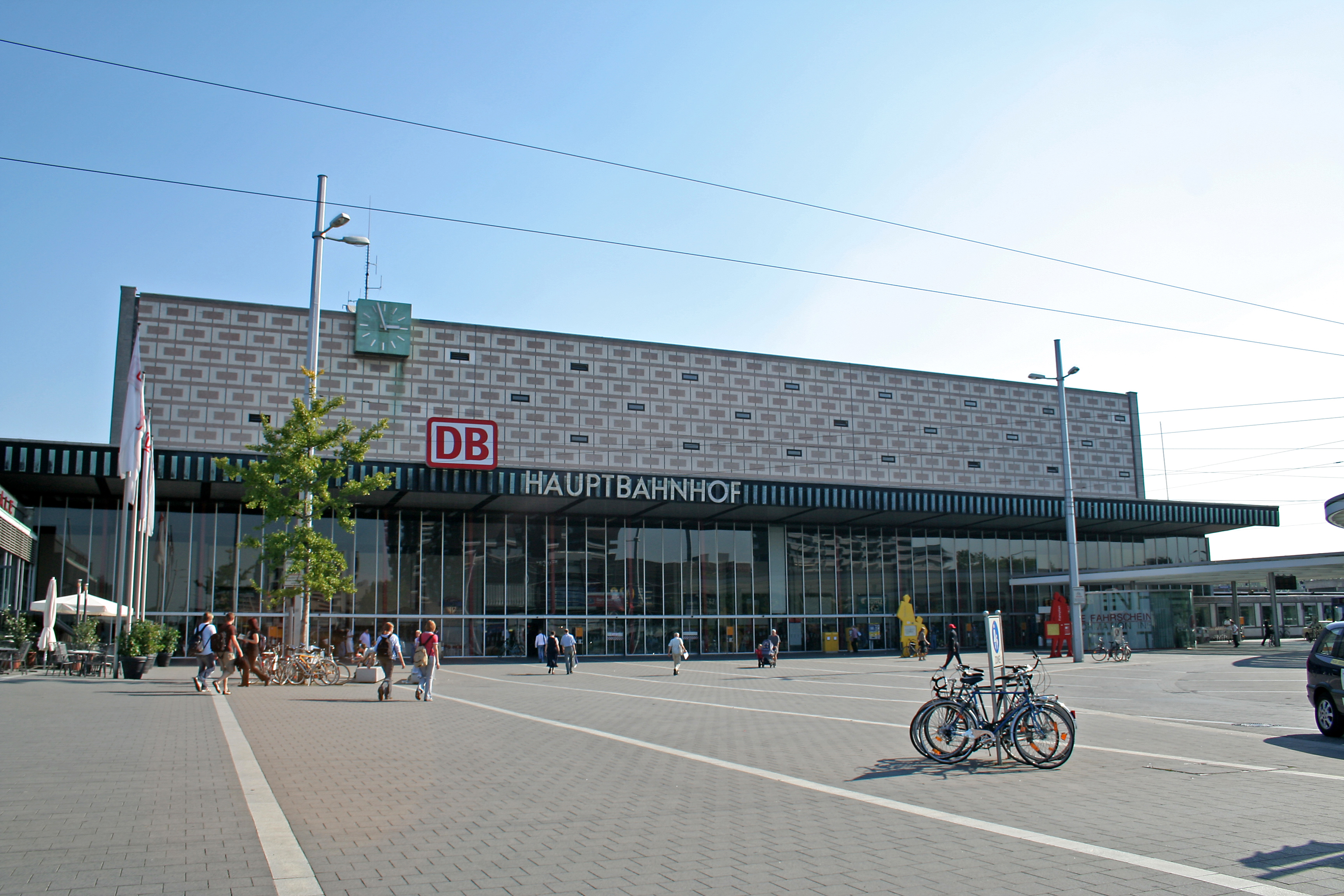
Brunswick Hauptbahnhof

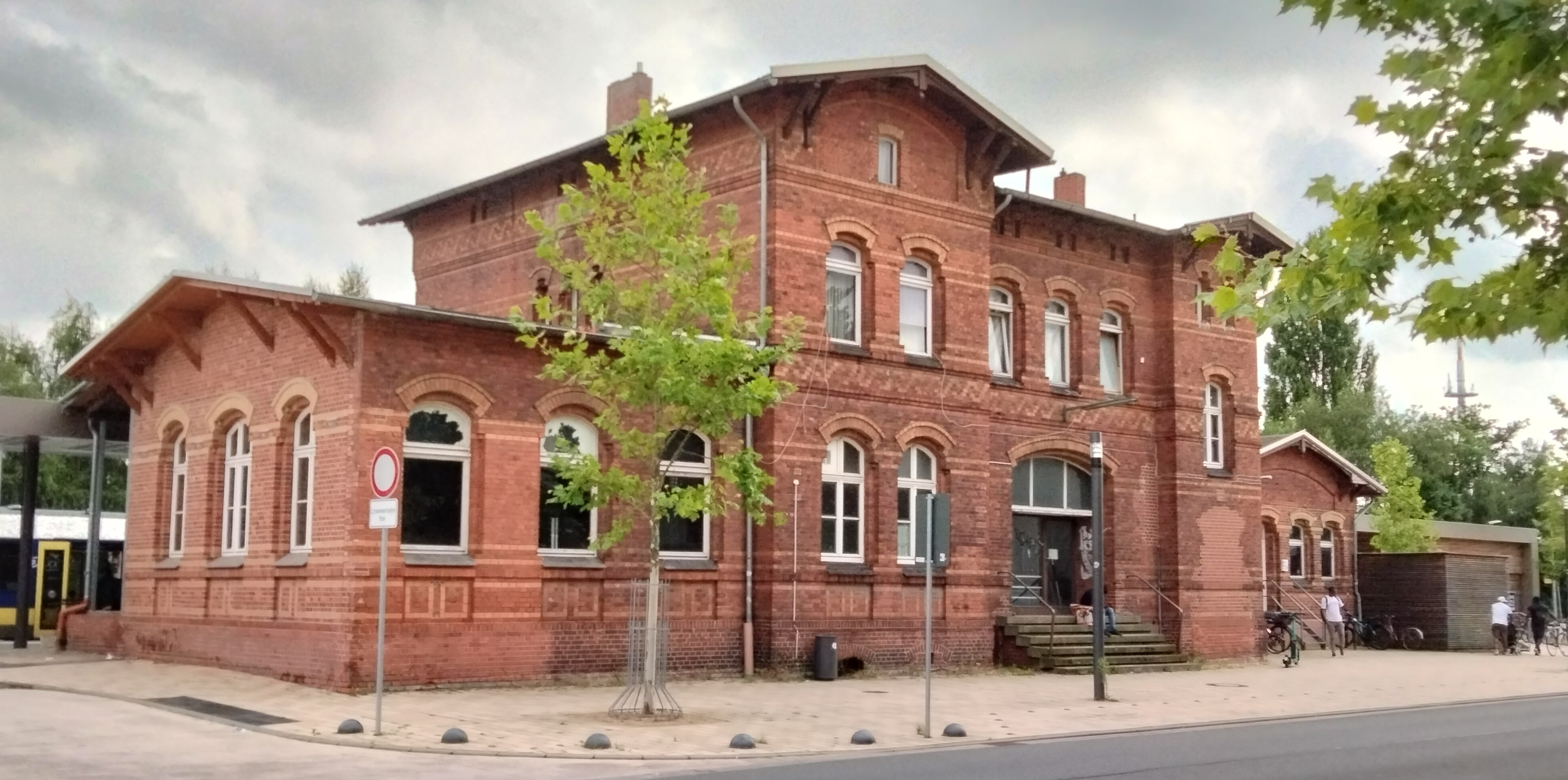
Gifhorn Stadt station

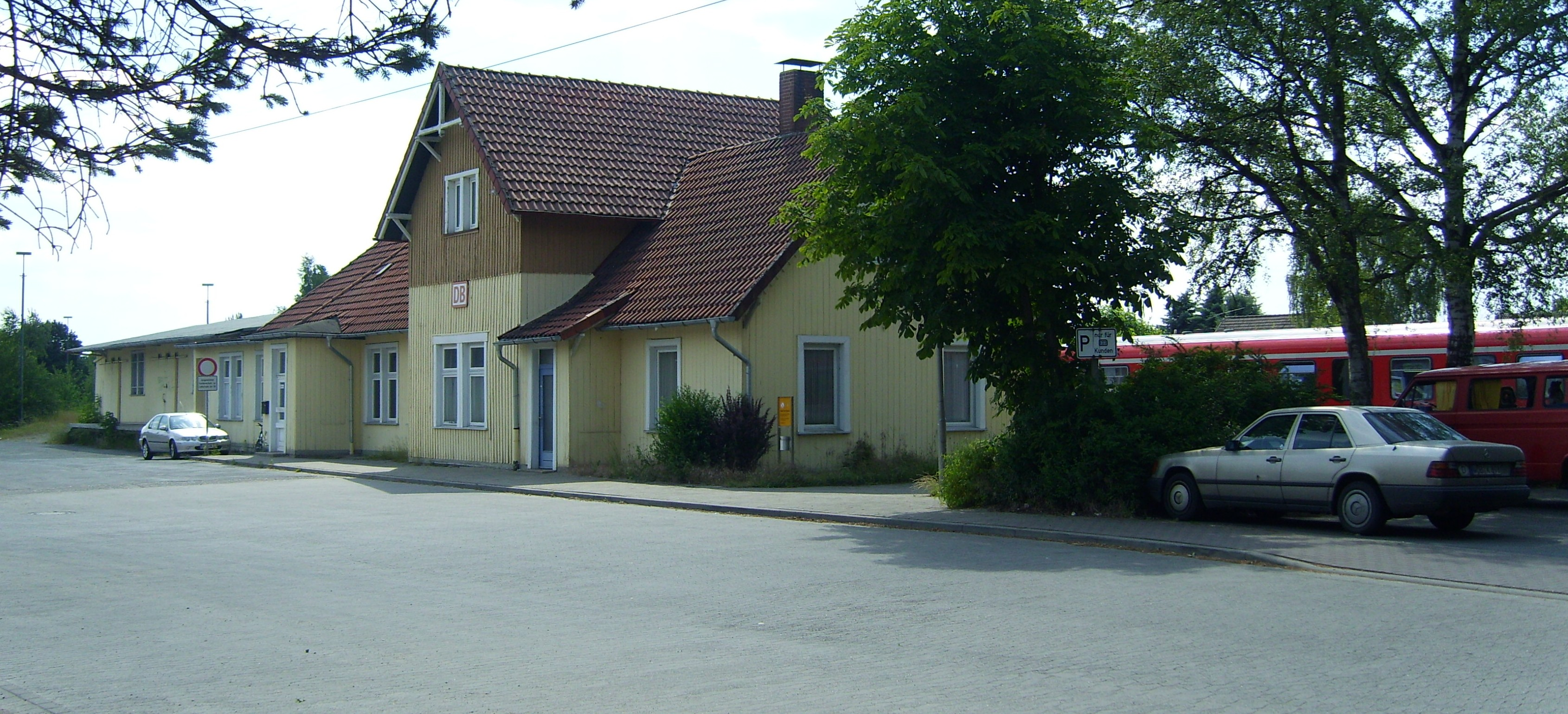
Wittingen station
