= Wrestedt (Samtgemeinde) =

Coordinates: 52.900°N 10.583°E

Wrestedt is a former Samtgemeinde ("collective municipality") in the district of Uelzen, in Lower Saxony, Germany. Its seat was in the village Wrestedt. At the 1 November 2011, local government reform, its municipalities merged into the municipality Wrestedt, and the Samtgemeinden Wrestedt and Bodenteich merged to form the new Samtgemeinde Aue.

== Municipalities ==
The Samtgemeinde Wrestedt consisted of the following municipalities:

1. Stadensen
2. Wieren
3. Wrestedt
