= Bodenteich (Samtgemeinde) =

Former municipality in Germany

Coordinates: 52.832°N 10.682°E

Bodenteich is a former Samtgemeinde ("collective municipality") in the district of Uelzen, in Lower Saxony, Germany. Its seat was in the village Bad Bodenteich. At the 1 November 2011 local government reform, the Samtgemeinden Bodenteich and Wrestedt merged to form the new Samtgemeinde Aue.

The Samtgemeinde Bodenteich consisted of the following municipalities:

1. Bad Bodenteich
2. Lüder
3. Soltendieck
