= Kurt Ranke =

German philologist (1908–1985)

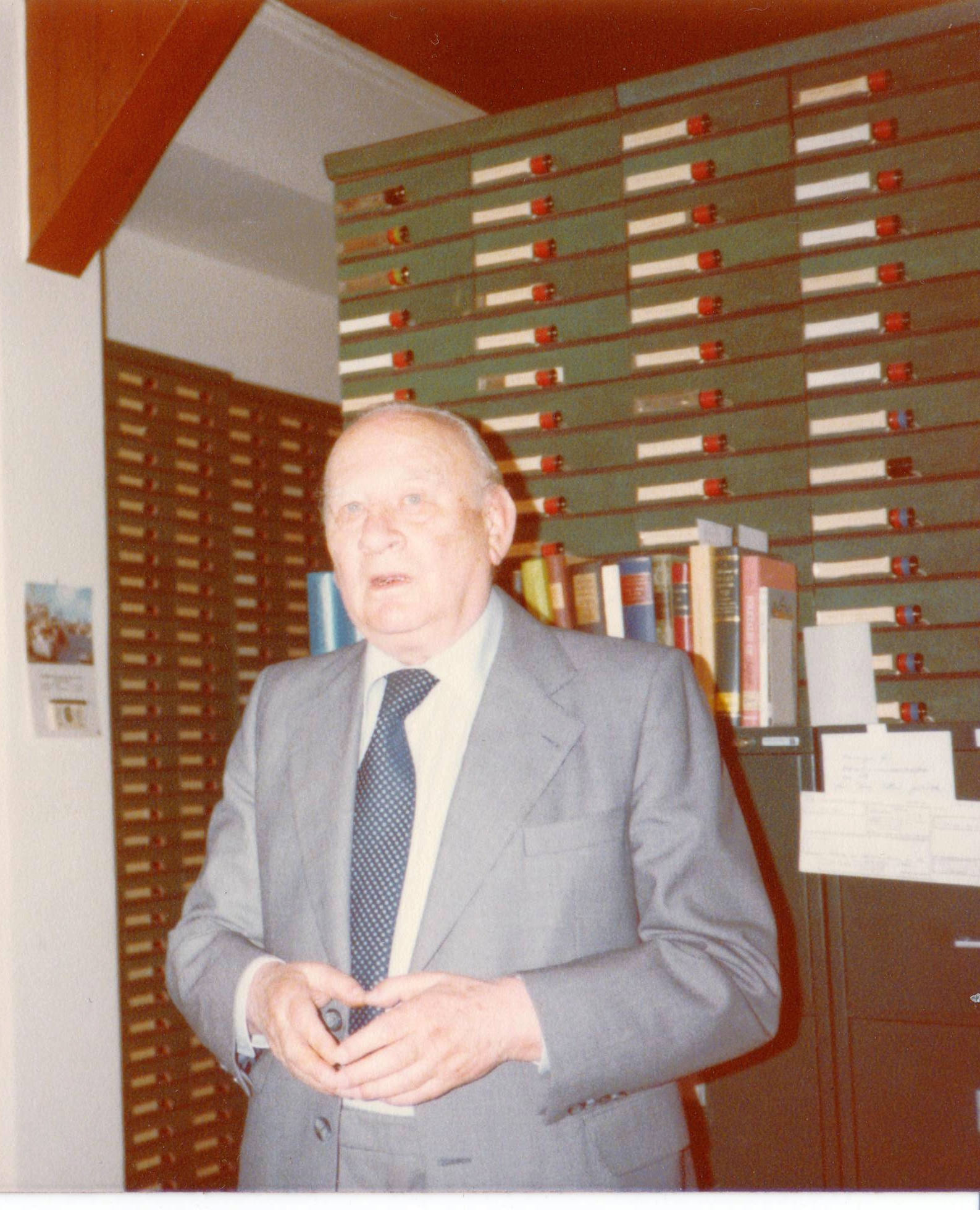
- Born: 14 April 1908; Blankenburg, German Empire
- Died: 6 June 1985 (aged 76); Stadensen, West Germany

Academic background
- Education: Kiel University

Academic work
- Discipline: Ethnology
- Institutions: University of Göttingen
- Main interests: Fairy tales
- Notable works: Encyclopedia of Fairy Tales

Kurt Ranke (14 April 1908 – 6 June 1985) was a German ethnologist who specialized in the study of fairy tales.

== Biography ==
Kurt Ranke was born in Blankenburg, Germany on 14 April 1908. His father was a postal inspector. Growing up in Essen, Ranke studied Germanistics, ethnology and history at the University of Bonn and the Ludwig-Maximilians-Universität München from 1927 to 1930. Ranke subsequently transferred to Kiel University, where he in 1933 gained a PhD on fairy tales under the supervision of Karl Wesle. He completed his habilitation on comparative religion, ethnology and ancient history in 1938 at Kiel University under the supervision of Wesle. His habilitation thesis centered on the cult of the dead in Indo-European religion.

After gaining his habilitation, Ranke lectured at Kiel on ethnology and ancient history, but was drafted into the Wehrmacht during World War II. In 1951, he resumed lecturing at Kiel University. He began publishing the Encyclopedia of Fairy Tales in 1957 and founded the journal Fabula in 1958, of which he served as editor. In 1958, he was appointed an associate professor at Kiel University. Ranke co-founded the International Society for Folk Narrative Research in 1959, serving as its first President, and appointed its Honorary President in 1974.

In 1960, Ranke succeeded Will Erich Peuckert as Professor and Chair of Ethnology at the University of Göttingen. Ranke played a leading role in the publishing of the second edition of the Reallexikon der Germanischen Altertumskunde and was a co-editor of several of its volumes. He was also an editor of Folklore Fellows’ Communications.

Ranke retired from the University of Göttingen in 1973. He was elected a member of the Göttingen Academy of Sciences and Humanities in 1977. He died in Stadensen, West Germany on 6 June 1985.

== Selected works ==
- Die zwei Brüder. Eine Studie zur vergleichenden Märchenforschung, 1934
- Indogermanische Totenverehrung, 1951
- Schleswig-holsteinische Volksmärchen, 1955-1962
- Die Welt der einfachen Formen, 1978

== See also ==
- Jost Trier
- Otto Höfler

== Sources ==
- Haid, Oliver (2003). "Ranke". In Beck, Heinrich; Geuenich, Dieter; Steuer, Heiko (eds.). Reallexikon der Germanischen Altertumskunde (in German). Vol. 24. Walter de Gruyter. pp. 129–132. ISBN 3110175754.
