= 190th Field Regiment, Royal Artillery =

190th Field Regiment, RA
- Royal Artillery cap badge
- Active: 1942–1945
- Country: United Kingdom
- Branch: British Army
- Role: Field artillery
- Size: 3 Batteries
- Part of: 15th (Scottish) Infantry Division
- Engagements: Operation Epsom; Operation Greenline; Operation Bluecoat; Seine crossing Operation Market Garden; Operation Pheasant; Operation Veritable; Operation Plunder; Operation Enterprise

190th Field Regiment was a unit of Britain's Royal Artillery (RA) during World War II. It was formed in 1942 and joined 15th (Scottish) Infantry Division remaining with that formation for its whole existence. After serving in home defence the regiment fought in Normandy (Operation Overlord) and through the campaign in North West Europe, during which it distinguished itself in the defence of Stadensen on 14/15 April 1945. It was disbanded after the end of the war.

== Mobilisation ==
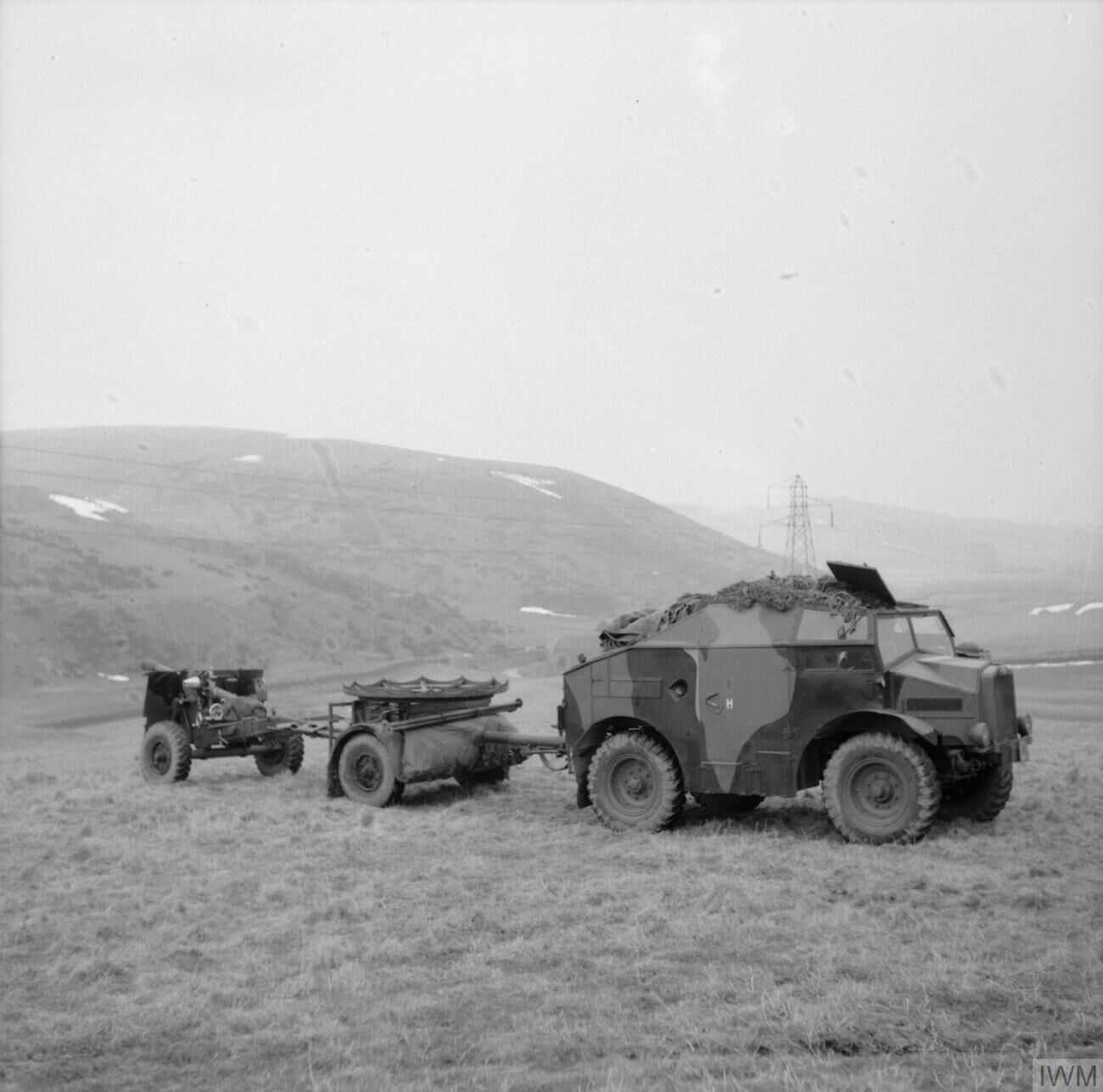
25-pounder gun and Quad gun tractor on exercise in Scotland, 1941.

The regiment was formed at Birtley, County Durham, on 21 December 1942, from personnel drawn from 9th Armoured Division. It consisted of three batteries, each of two troops of four Mk II 25-pounder guns. The batteries were initially designated P, Q and R, then numbered 529, 530 and 531 on 1 January 1943. After training, under the command of Lt-Col R.J. Streatfield, the regiment joined 15th (Scottish) Division on 29 March 1943.

== Service ==
=== Overlord training ===
In March 1943 the division was raised to full war establishment, initially as a 'Mixed' division including an armoured brigade, then from September 1943 as a conventional infantry division as part of Second Army in 21st Army Group preparing for the Allied landings in Normandy (Operation Overlord). In that month, 15th (S) Division moved from Northumberland to a training area in the West Riding of Yorkshire and began a series of training exercises through the winter. 190th Field Rgt was paired with 46th (Highland) Bde for training and future operations. In mid-February the whole division participated in a 12-day training exercise (Exercise Eagle) in the Yorkshire Wolds along with the other divisions assigned to VIII Corps. In April 1944 the division moved to its concentration area in Sussex to prepare for embarkation.

=== Normandy ===
The assault formations of 21st Army Group landed on D Day (6 June). Although parts of 15th (S) Division had begun landing on 13 June, the weather deteriorated and some units were not complete until 23 June. The guns then moved up into 'hides' during 24 June before the division was committed to its first action in the Battle of the Odon (Operation Epsom) at 07.30 on 26 June. It attacked on a two-brigade front behind a Creeping barrage fired by 344 divisional and corps field and medium guns. The objective was to force crossings of the Rivers Orne and Odon. The infantry fought their way into the villages of Cheux and St Manvieu but the Odon bridges were still 2 miles (3.2 km) away at the end of the first day. The following day the Scots captured the vital bridge over the Odon, by the end of which 15th (S) Division had created a deep salient into the German positions (known as 'Scottish Corridor') without reaching the Orne. Over following days the Germans made repeated attempts to overwhelm the corridor. Ultimately the Germans could not take the pounding from concentrated Allied firepower and had to stop their attacks. However, Operation Epsom caused a quarter of all the casualties suffered by 15th (S) Division in the North West Europe campaign.

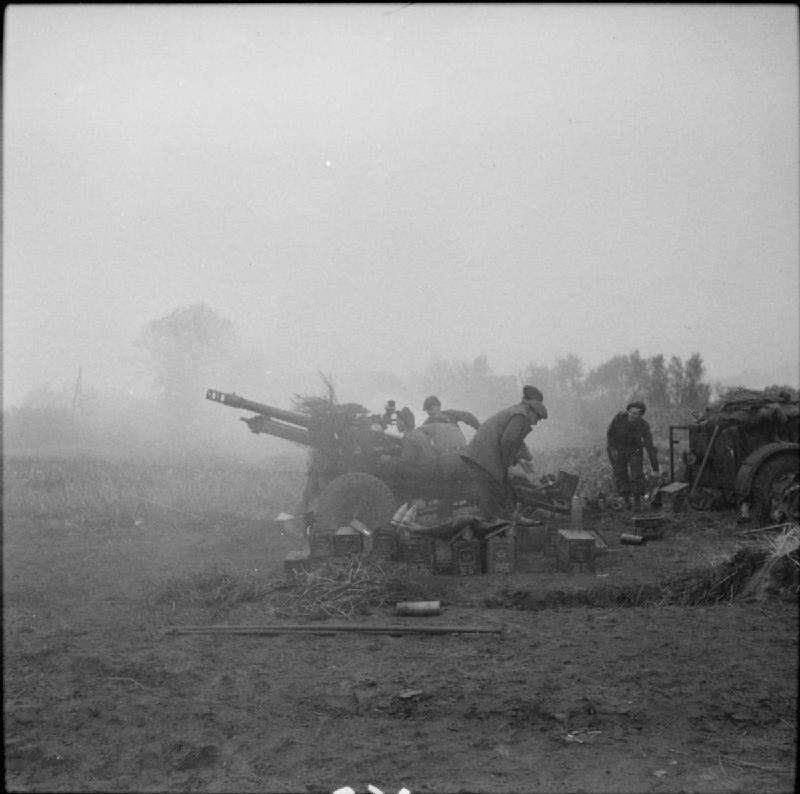
25-pounders in action in North West Europe, 1944.

For the next month the division fought its way slowly through the Bocage country, capturing Éterville, retaking Gavrus and advancing to Évrecy in Operations Jupiter and Greenline. The division was then quickly switched west for Operation Bluecoat, the attack on Caumont-sur-Orne, beginning on 30 July. This allowed the artillery little time to plan, and to preserve secrecy there was no preliminary bombardment. 190th Field Rgt married up as usual with 46th (H) Bde, its observation posts (OPs) accompanying 9th Battalion Cameronians; the field regiments also had OPs in tanks with the supporting 6th Guards Tank Brigade. 15th (Scottish) Division's artillery was tasked with firing concentrations in support of the attacking troops in Phase I. For Phase II a 110-minute slow barrage was fired. Three-quarters of the 25-pdr rounds were fuzed to Air burst, which was effective over bocage and allowed the tanks to keep close to the barrage in safety. The division's objective was Point 309 ('Quarry Hill') to protect the flank of the attack. Launched on 30 July the attack made good progress, with 15th (S) Division getting onto the Estry and Perrier Ridges to support the advancing armour. Heavy fighting ensued for several days, 15th (S) Division supporting 43rd (Wessex) Division's seizure of Mont Pinçon on 6 August. On 13 August the Germans began to withdraw and 15th (S) Division was relieved and went to rest.

=== Low Countries ===
After its rest, the division joined XII Corps and was engaged in rapid movements as 21st Army Group advanced to the River Seine. 15th (S) Division made an assault crossing of the river against limited opposition, and the Royal Engineers soon erected bridges to allow the supporting units to cross. The division pressed on to Les Andelys, finding the Germans already gone. The armoured divisions then passed through, and after four days 15th (S) Division followed them into Belgium, taking over a small bridgehead across the Albert Canal near Geel. On 13 September the division pushed on to the Junction Canal. Then on the night of 14/15 September it struggled to seize a bridgehead over the canal at Aart and defend it against a succession of counter-attacks. Ammunition shortage restricted the divisional artillery to urgent defensive fire (DF) tasks only. One attack on the evening of 16 September was held off by small arms fire, while the guns hit the enemy troops in the rear, then caught another counter-attack as it was forming up. Operation Market Garden was launched on 17 September, with XXX Corps breaking out of its own canal bridgehead. Given the fierce resistance at Aart, XII Corps HQ decided to cross elsewhere, while 15th (S) Division merely improved its position and bridged the Junction Canal. The divisional artillery continued its DF tasks to break up counter-attacks.

15th (Scottish) Division next went into action at Best on 21 September in an attempt to widen XXX Corps' narrow corridor. The divisional artillery OP parties took up position in the Bata Shoe Factory. On 26 September the division put in a set-piece attack on the cement factory with 46th (H) Bde, supported by the whole of the divisional artillery. Although Operation Market Garden had ended in failure, fighting continued round Best until 1 October, when the division was finally relieved for rest.

The division returned to the line on 19 October for Operation Pheasant to support 51st (Highland) Division, which was attacking 's-Hertogenbosch. After 15th (Scottish) liberated Tilburg on 28 October, the Germans put in a heavy counter-attack against 7th US Armored Division at Asten. The division's troops were rushed across to help stop the attack up the Asten–Meijel road. Afterwards 15th (Scottish) Division remained at Meijel under heavy German artillery fire for several weeks, but its own barrage when advancing towards the town was also effective. The Germans withdrew on 18 November, and the division followed up in bad weather. It was relieved on 27–28 November.

On 3 December the Division carried out a textbook attack on Blerick to eliminate the remaining German bridgehead on the River Maas, opposite Venlo. It employed a single brigade, 44th (Lowland), backed by Second Army's's superior resources in airpower, engineering and artillery to overcome formidable minefields, anti-tank ditches and fortifications. The divisional artillery was reinforced with no less than three Army Groups Royal Artillery (AGRAs), making a total of over 400 guns, including super-heavies. The artillery programme began at 05.25, when 'Blerick was blotted out by smoke and dust and sheets of flame'. The breaching operation started at 07.25 and was a complete success, with low casualties. 15th (Scottish) Division remained on the line of the Maas for the next seven weeks while Second Army turned to assist US forces to block the German Ardennes Offensive.

=== Rhineland ===
Between 23 and 28 January 1945 15th (S) Division was concentrated at Tilburg to prepare for Operation Veritable to clear the Reichswald between the Maas and the River Rhine. The division was given four objectives, the first and easiest phase (Operation Gilbert) was to close up to the Siegfried Line defences. Advancing on a two-brigade front, the attack was supported by the divisional artillery reinforced by two self-propelled field regiments and a medium regiment. The divisional artillery moved up to its assembly area on the night of 5/6 February, the field regiments taking up positions astride the main road by last light on 7 February. The preliminary bombardment of the enemy defences began at 05.00 on 8 February, and at 07.30 the guns switched to firing smoke screens designed to draw enemy fire against the expected attack. There was then a pause to allow the sound-rangers and flash-spotters to locate the German artillery. The destructive fire was renewed at 07.50, with Counter-battery fire until 10.00 when the barrage began. H Hour for 15 (S) Division was at 10.30 and then the barrage advanced ahead of the infantry in a series of 300 yards (270 m) lifts every 12 minutes; each lift was signalled to the infantry by one gun of each troop firing a round of yellow smoke. By keeping up with the barrage the infantry achieved the first objective successfully, but Operation Sullivan, to breach the Siegfried Line at 21.00, was held up by traffic jams and bad going. By 08.00 the following morning there was still no sign of the battalion due to carry out the attack. It took until the evening of 9/10 February for the division to reach its main objective, the 'Materborn Feature' overlooking the town of Kleve. Over following days it made slow progress through the forest against increasing German artillery. Conditions were so bad that 25-pdr ammunition had to be delivered to the guns by amphibious vehicles until a circuitous road was opened up. Two brigades of the division were relieved on 15 February, but 46th (H) Bde continued attacking Moyland Castle until 17 February. The division then took part in Operation Blockbuster to capture Goch. It was finally relieved on 25–26 February.

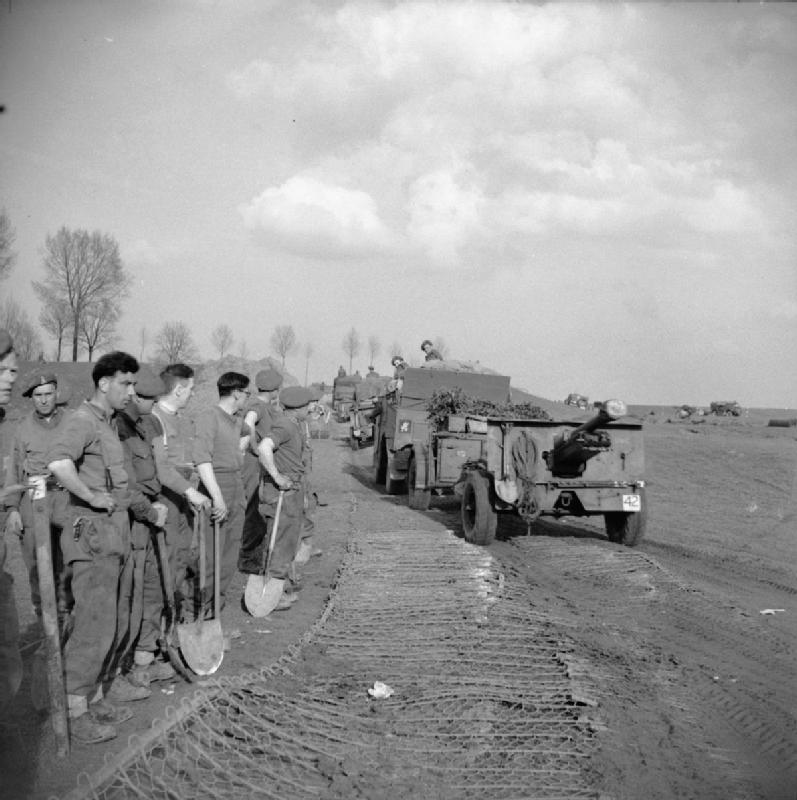
25-pounders moving up to cross the Rhine, March 1945.

=== Rhine crossing ===
In early March 1945, 15th (S) Division was withdrawn to Belgium to begin training for the assault crossing of the River Rhine (Operation Plunder). Its role was to establish a two-brigade bridgehead at Xanten in Operation Torchlight covered by an intense artillery bombardment. Establishing gun positions and dumping of ammunition close up to the river was carried out behind a massive smokescreen, and the guns moved in on the night of 22 March. The bombardment for XXX Corps' crossing began at 17.00 on 23 March, followed an hour later by the 700 guns of XII Corps supporting 15th (S) Division. The preparation began with CB fire, then at 11.30 the full 'softening' bombardment began. 44th (L) Brigade's crossing went off successfully and it made good progress on the far bank; 227th (H) Bde had more difficulties, with units landing out of position. 10th HLI landing near Wolffskath was held up by fire from Bettenhof about 1,000 yards (910 m) inland. The radio with the artillery forward observation officer (FOO) was out of action, but his instructions were passed via an infantry set and brought down a concentration on Bettenhof that allowed the battalion to advance and take the village. Nevertheless, the brigade established itself on the far bank, protected by DF tasks fired by the artillery. The artillery fell silent just before 10.00 on 24 March as the aircraft carrying XVIII Airborne Corps went over to drop their troops behind the German defenders in Operation Varsity. During the rest of the day the artillery fired DF tasks to support the bridgehead, which was expanded by 46th (H) Bde), and on 25 March the divisional field regiments began crossing the river on rafts.

=== Germany ===
After completing mopping up operations the division was pulled out of action on 29 March and went into billets in German houses. On 3 April it was on the move again, to catch up with the fighting and it took the lead on 10 April, advancing towards Uelzen, mopping up scattered German forces. On the night of 14/15 April the 2nd Battalion Glasgow Highlanders halted in the village of Stadensen. For security the battalion formed a perimeter camp, with a rifle company at each corner, enclosing all the supporting arms, including a mass of transport parked in the streets and alleys of the village. Regimental HQ of 190th Field Rgt, together with 529 and 530 Fd Btys were inside this camp. The squadron of 15th (S) Reconnaissance Regiment that had been screening the advance was harboured at nearby Nettelkamp. Shortly before midnight firing was heard from the direction of Nettelkamp, but soon died away. In fact the recce squadron there had been overrun, and at 04.00 the two Glasgow Highlanders companies at the eastern corners of Stadensen came under fire. Soon afterwards a battle group of Panzer Division Clausewitz, consisting of infantry riding on self-propelled (SP) guns and armoured half-tracks, overran the forward platoons and crashed into the village. A wild melee followed, in which most of the buildings and transport were set on fire by the SP guns, followed by explosions of abandoned German ammunition dumps and British ammunition trucks. The crews of the harboured tanks (4th Coldstream Guards) and guns (190th Fd Rgt and an SP Troop of 91st Anti-Tank Rgt) rushed to get into action. Major J.H.M Stephenson of 530 Fd Bty distinguished himself in the action, first shooting a German officer with his revolver, then knocking out two German half-tracks with a PIAT, and then successfully manning a 25-pdr in the anti-tank role. He was awarded a Military Cross.The guns and tanks succeeded in taking up positions to cover the main road junctions. The fighting in the village lasted until after dawn. The Germans then began to retire, but by now the two field batteries were in action with an OP manned, and together with the Coldsteam tanks and the A/T guns of the 91st and the Glasgow Highlanders took a heavy toll of the retreating Germans. There was further bitter fighting round Uelzen until 18 April, by which time the town was surrounded and the defenders began to surrender.

=== Elbe crossing ===
15th (S) Division then drove on to reach the River Elbe on 20 April. Here it halted to prepare for the assault crossing. The CB bombardment began at midnight on 28 April, and the softening bombardment at 00.50. The sight of this bombardment playing on the opposite cliffs under the artificial moonlight provided by searchlights was described as 'awe-inspiring'. The amphibious vehicles began crossing at 02.00, when the barrage lifted from the shoreline to the top of the cliff. By 08.00 the assaulting battalions had cleared the riverside villages and were advancing over the plateau behind. Next day the division drove off the last counter-attack of the campaign, and the divisional artillery began crossing the river. The division continued to advance through the Sachsenwald towards Hamburg, which surrendered before the division reached it. On 4 May the division was moving in the direction of Lubeck when the German surrender at Lüneburg Heath was signed. On Victory in Europe Day, Tuesday, 8 May 1945, one member of the 190th, Luther Woollands, recorded in his diary "listened to Churchill & the King on the wireless" from Hamburg. After some months of occupation duties in Germany, the regiment was disbanded on 31 October 1945.
