= Aue (Samtgemeinde) =

- Samtgemeinde
- Location of Aue within Uelzen district
- Interactive map of Aue
- Location within Germany Location within Lower Saxony
- Coordinates: 52°52′N 10°38′E
- Country: Germany
- State: Lower Saxony
- District: Uelzen
- Seat: Wrestedt
- Subdivisions: 4 municipalities

Area
  - Total: 281.71 km^{2} (108.77 sq mi)

Population (2025-12-31)
  - Total: 12,793
  - Density: 45.412/km^{2} (117.62/sq mi)
- Time zone: UTC+01:00 (CET)
  - Summer (DST): UTC+02:00 (CEST)
- Website: www.samtgemeinde-aue.de

Aue is a Samtgemeinde ("collective municipality") in the district of Uelzen, in Lower Saxony, Germany. Its seat is in the village Wrestedt. It was formed on 1 November 2011 by the merger of the former Samtgemeinden Wrestedt and Bodenteich.

The Samtgemeinde Aue consists of the following municipalities:

1. Bad Bodenteich
2. Lüder
3. Soltendieck
4. Wrestedt
