= Wieren =

- Ortsteil of Wrestedt
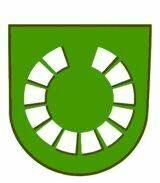
- Coat of arms
- Interactive map of Wieren
- Location within Germany Location within Lower Saxony
- Coordinates: 52°53′N 10°39′E
- Country: Germany
- State: Lower Saxony
- District: Uelzen
- Municipality: Wrestedt
- Subdivisions: 8

Area
  - Total: 52.7 km^{2} (20.3 sq mi)
- Elevation: 59 m (194 ft)

Population (2010-12-31)
  - Total: 2,458
  - Density: 46.6/km^{2} (121/sq mi)
- Time zone: UTC+01:00 (CET)
  - Summer (DST): UTC+02:00 (CEST)
- Postal codes: 29568
- Dialling codes: 05825
- Vehicle registration: UE
- Website: www.wieren.de

Wieren is a village and a former municipality in the district of Uelzen, in Lower Saxony, Germany. Since 1 November 2011, it is part of the municipality Wrestedt.
