= Soltendieck =

- Municipality
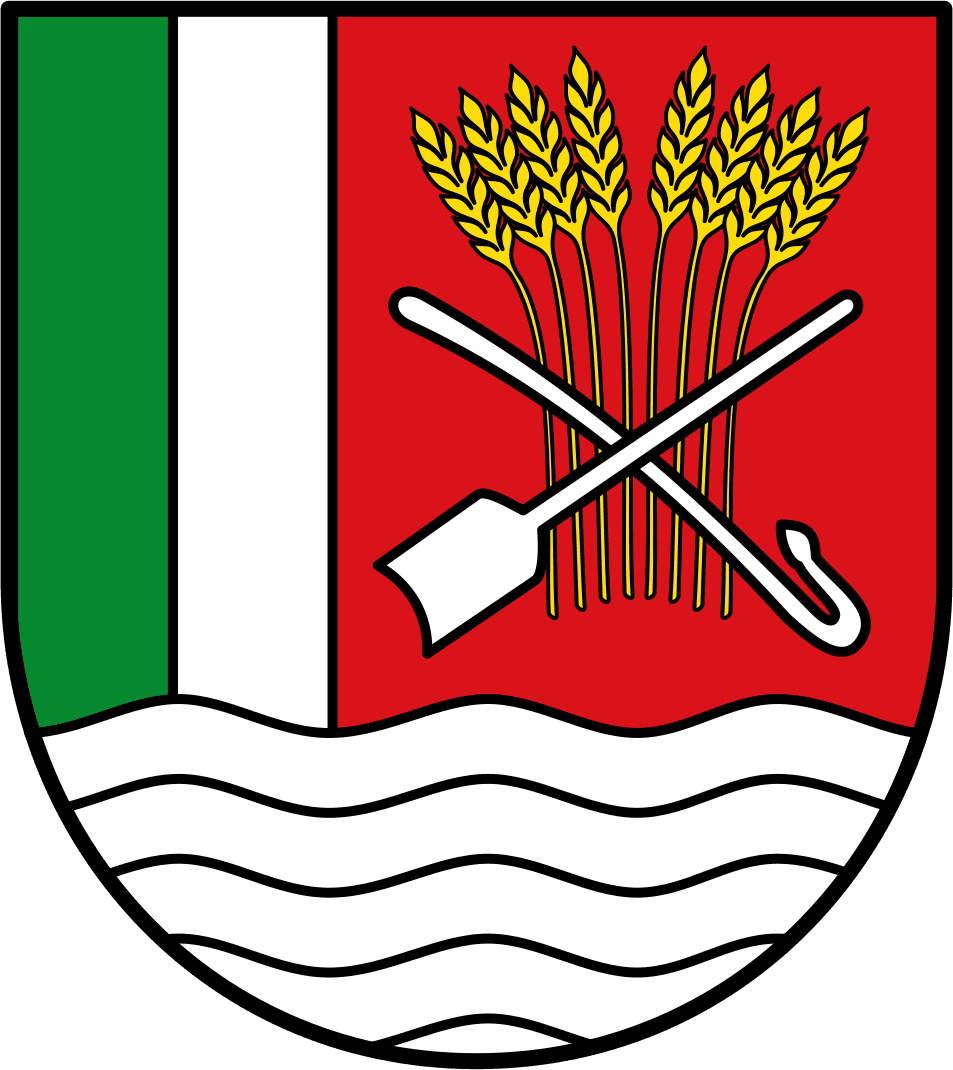
- Flag Coat of arms

- Location of Soltendieck within Uelzen district
- Interactive map of Soltendieck
- Location within Germany Location within Lower Saxony
- Coordinates: 52°52′22″N 10°45′42″E
- Country: Germany
- State: Lower Saxony
- District: Uelzen
- Municipal assoc.: Aue
- Subdivisions: 8

Government
  - Mayor: Jürgen Wöhling (CDU)

Area
  - Total: 34.01 km^{2} (13.13 sq mi)
- Elevation: 77 m (253 ft)

Population (2025-12-31)
  - Total: 1,001
  - Density: 29.43/km^{2} (76.23/sq mi)
- Time zone: UTC+01:00 (CET)
  - Summer (DST): UTC+02:00 (CEST)
- Postal codes: 29594
- Dialling codes: 05874
- Vehicle registration: UE
- Website: www.samtgemeinde-aue.de

Soltendieck is a municipality in the district of Uelzen, in Lower Saxony, Germany.
