= Lüder =

Lüdder
- Municipality
- Coat of arms

- Location of Lüdder within Uelzen district
- Interactive map of Lüdder
- Location within Germany Location within Lower Saxony
- Coordinates: 52°49′N 10°40′E
- Country: Germany
- State: Lower Saxony
- District: Uelzen
- Municipal assoc.: Aue
- Subdivisions: 4

Government
  - Mayor: Eberhard Siemeke (CDU)

Area
  - Total: 55.33 km^{2} (21.36 sq mi)
- Elevation: 69 m (226 ft)

Population (2025-12-31)
  - Total: 1,148
  - Density: 20.75/km^{2} (53.74/sq mi)
- Time zone: UTC+01:00 (CET)
  - Summer (DST): UTC+02:00 (CEST)
- Postal codes: 29394
- Dialling codes: 05824
- Vehicle registration: UE

Lüder is a municipality in the district of Uelzen, in Lower Saxony, Germany.

Through the area flows a small river of the same name, with its source in the upland bog of the Völzberger Köpfchen and its mouth where it flows into the Fulda.
