= Bad Bodenteich =

- Municipality
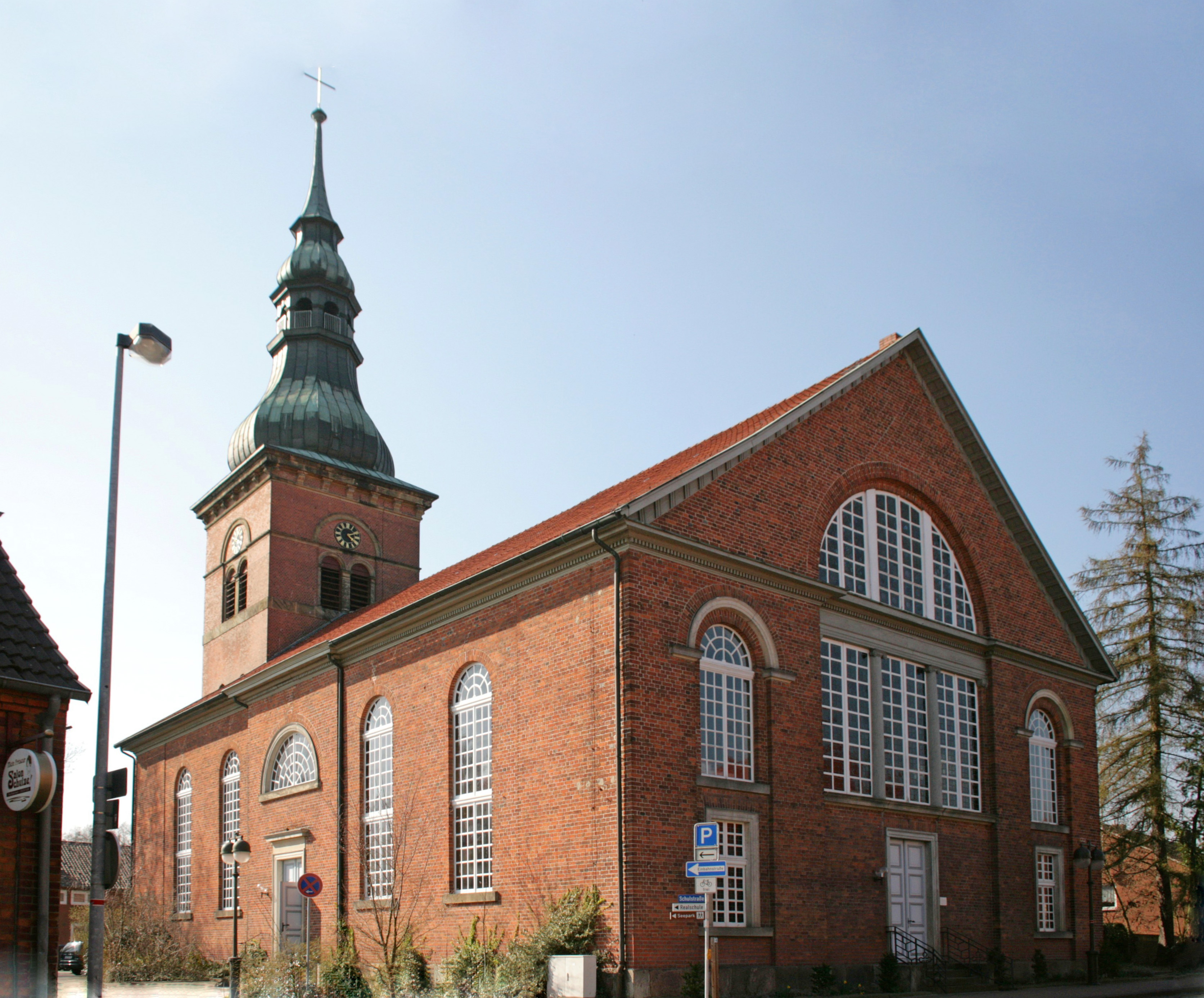
- Saint Peter Church

- Coat of arms

- Location of Bad Bodenteich within Uelzen district
- Interactive map of Bad Bodenteich
- Location within Germany Location within Lower Saxony
- Coordinates: 52°50′04″N 10°40′56″E
- Country: Germany
- State: Lower Saxony
- District: Uelzen
- Municipal assoc.: Aue
- Subdivisions: 9

Government
  - Mayor: Jörg Formella (since 29 Jan 2020) (CDU)

Area
  - Total: 49.88 km^{2} (19.26 sq mi)
- Elevation: 55 m (180 ft)

Population (2025-12-31)
  - Total: 4,545
  - Density: 91.12/km^{2} (236.0/sq mi)
- Time zone: UTC+01:00 (CET)
  - Summer (DST): UTC+02:00 (CEST)
- Postal codes: 29389
- Dialling codes: 05824
- Vehicle registration: UE
- Website: www.bad-bodenteich.de

Bad Bodenteich (Eastphalian: Bonndiek) is a municipality in the district of Uelzen, in Lower Saxony, Germany. It is situated approximately 17 km southeast of Uelzen.

Bad Bodenteich was the seat of the former Samtgemeinde ("collective municipality") Bodenteich.
