= Voith Gravita =

Family of railway locomotives

Voith Gravita family
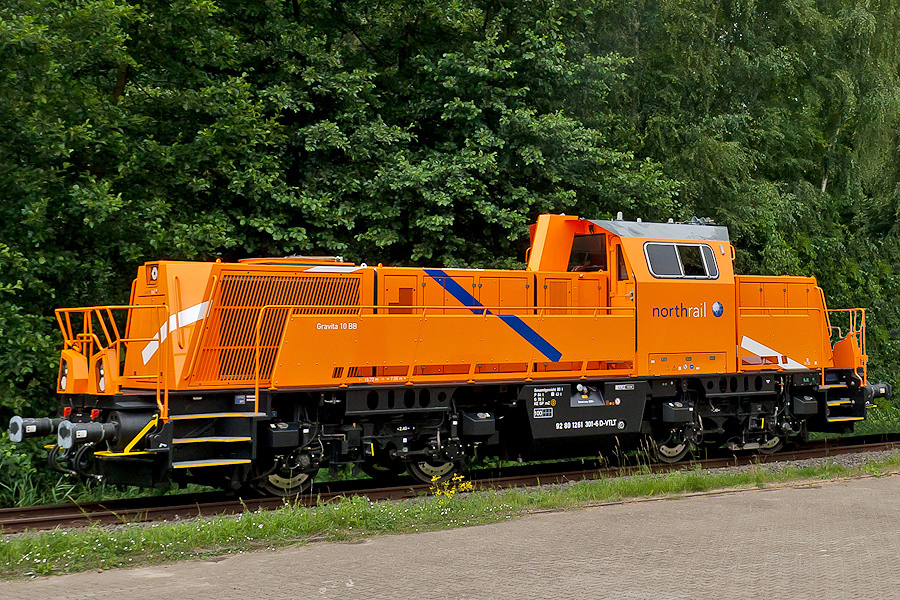
- Gravita 10BB
Type and origin
- Power type: Diesel-hydraulic
- Builder: Voith Turbo (Germany)
Specifications
- Configuration
  - UIC: Model 5B: B; Models 10BB, 15BB, 20BB: B′B′
- Gauge: 1,435 mm (4 ft 8 1/2 in) (Standard gauge)
- Length: 5B: ~10 m (32 ft 10 in); 5C: ~11 m (36 ft 1 in); 10BB: ~15.7 m (51 ft 6 in); 15BB: ~16.9 m (55 ft 5 in); 20BB: ~18.5 m (60 ft 8 in)
- Loco weight: 5B: 40–45 t (39.4–44.3 long tons; 44.1–49.6 short tons); 5C: 60–67.5 t (59.1–66.4 long tons; 66.1–74.4 short tons); 10BB: 76–100 t (75–98 long tons; 84–110 short tons); 15BB: 80–90 t (79–89 long tons; 88–99 short tons); 20BB: 84–88 t (83–87 long tons; 93–97 short tons)
- Fuel type: Diesel fuel
- Fuel capacity: 5B: 2,000 L (440 imp gal; 530 US gal); 5C: 2,500 L (550 imp gal; 660 US gal); 10BB: 3,300 L (730 imp gal; 870 US gal); 15BB: 5,000 L (1,100 imp gal; 1,300 US gal); 20BB: 6,000 L (1,300 imp gal; 1,600 US gal)
- Prime mover: MTU 4000
- Transmission: Hydraulic (Voith L series)
Performance figures
- Maximum speed: 5B, 5C: 80 km/h (50 mph); 10BB, 15BB: 100 km/h (62 mph); 20BB: 120 km/h (75 mph)
- Power output: 5B: 400 kW (540 hp); 5C: 700 kW (940 hp); 10BB: 1,200 kW (1,600 hp); 15BB: 1,800 kW (2,400 hp); 20BB: 2,200 kW (3,000 hp)
- Tractive effort: Maximum tractive effort at μ=0.42: 5B: 165–185 kN (37,000–42,000 lb_{f}); 5C: 247–289 kN (56,000–65,000 lb_{f}); 10BB: 313–412 kN (70,000–93,000 lb_{f}); 15BB: 330–317 kN (74,000–71,000 lb_{f}); 20BB: 346–363 kN (78,000–82,000 lb_{f}); Practical starting tractive effort at μ=0.33: 5B: 129–146 kN (29,000–33,000 lb_{f}); 5C: 194–219 kN (44,000–49,000 lb_{f}); 10BB: 246–337 kN (55,000–76,000 lb_{f}); 15BB: 259–291 kN (58,000–65,000 lb_{f}); 20BB: 272–285 kN (61,000–64,000 lb_{f})
Career
- Official name: Gravita
- Locale: Germany

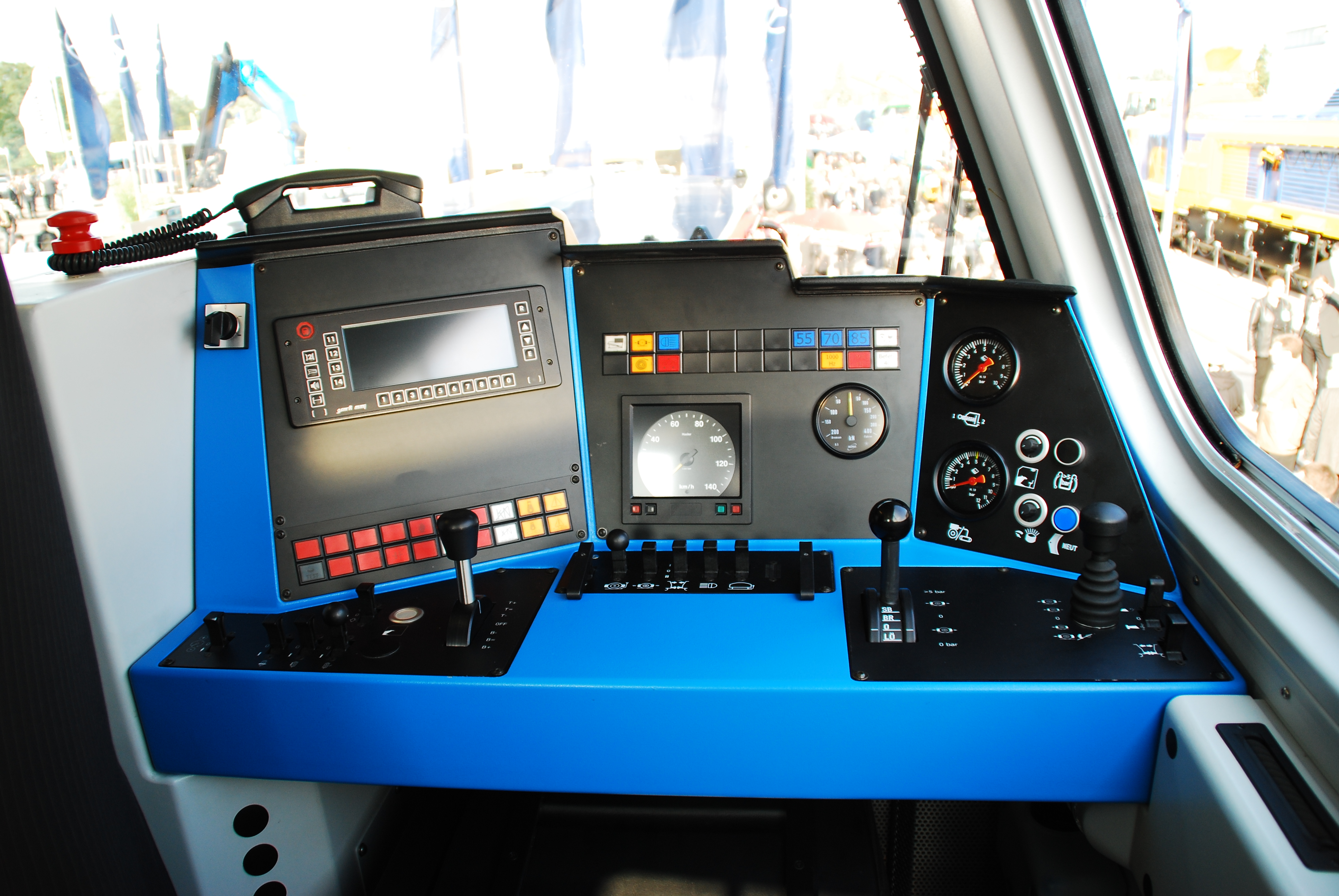
Inside drivers cabin of Voith Gravita loco

The Voith Gravita locomotives are a family of road switcher diesel-hydraulic locomotives built by Voith Turbo Lokomotivtechnik GmbH & Co. KG. Available in a range of configurations from 4 to 6 axles, they are designed for shunting and light and medium freight operations.

The 10BB version has been chosen by Deutsche Bahn as a replacement for its DB Class 290 locomotives with an order of 130 locos in 2008.

== History ==
Voith, a well known manufacture of hydraulic transmissions and other locomotive components entered the locomotive building business in 2006 with the launch of the Voith Maxima locomotives at InnoTrans. The Gravita series was launched at the 2008 InnoTrans event. For the production of these locomotives a new plant has been constructed in Kiel, a city already known for locomotive production.

The Gravita 15BB variant was presented at InnoTrans 2010. The Gravita BB locomotives are currently used in Germany, Norway and Sweden.

== Technology ==
Key features of this series are large fuel tanks, modular construction (allowing interchangeability of some parts between different classes), multi-traction (consisting) with other Voith locomotives, manual or remote operation, and a centrally located air conditioned drivers cabin.

The locomotives meet requirements for noise (TSI) and exhaust gas emission UIC II/EU IIIA (see International Union of Railways and European emission standards)

== Variants ==
Voith offers 5 variants of this locomotive, ranging from a light shunter to a medium power locomotive. Some technical specifications are presented above (in the 'infobox'), the purpose of use is given below.

- 20BB Designed for regional and cross border traffic
- 15BB Designed for heavy shunting as well as mainline use
- 10BB Shunting and freight - minimalist design for heavy industrial operation
- 5C Heavy shunting and light freight
- 5B Light shunter

== Servicing ==
Under an agreement with Häfen und Güterverkehr Köln (HGK) a workshop for servicing Voith locomotives has been established at Brühl-Vochem near Köln.

== Career and orders ==
On 23 September 2008 it was announced that Deutsche Bahn had placed a €250 million order for 130 of the 10BB variant to be operated by its DB Schenker subsidiary. The 1000 kW locos will have engines supplied by MTU, and are intended to replace the well known DB Class V 90 (aka DBAG Class 290); the new reporting number for this class of locomotive was 260. vehicles fitted with a diesel particulate filter received the class number 261.

10BB and 15BB type locomotives were initially offered via lease from Ox-Traction; the company ceased trading in August 2010.

Swiss companies Stahl Gerlafingen and Panlog AG took delivery of their Gravita 10BB locomotives in March 2010. Stahl Gerlafingen operates 2 locos, Panlog AG 3 locos.

The first 3 built locomotives were sold to leasing company Northrail and painted in orange livery in mid-2010. Voith has 5 additional leasing/stock locomotives which are being tested by different rail operators.

Baneservice Scandinavia currently operates a fleet of five Gravita 15BB locomotives based at the Port of Gothenburg in Gothenburg, Sweden, where they are designated as "Class 261". These locomotives primarily perform shunting duties at the Port of Gothenburg and have also more recently been used for some limited regular freight traffic, such as the Gothenburg–Limmared freight route.
