= DB Class V 90 =

Locomotive class

DB Class V 90 DB Class 290 DBAG Class 290 Also classes 291, 294, 295, 296
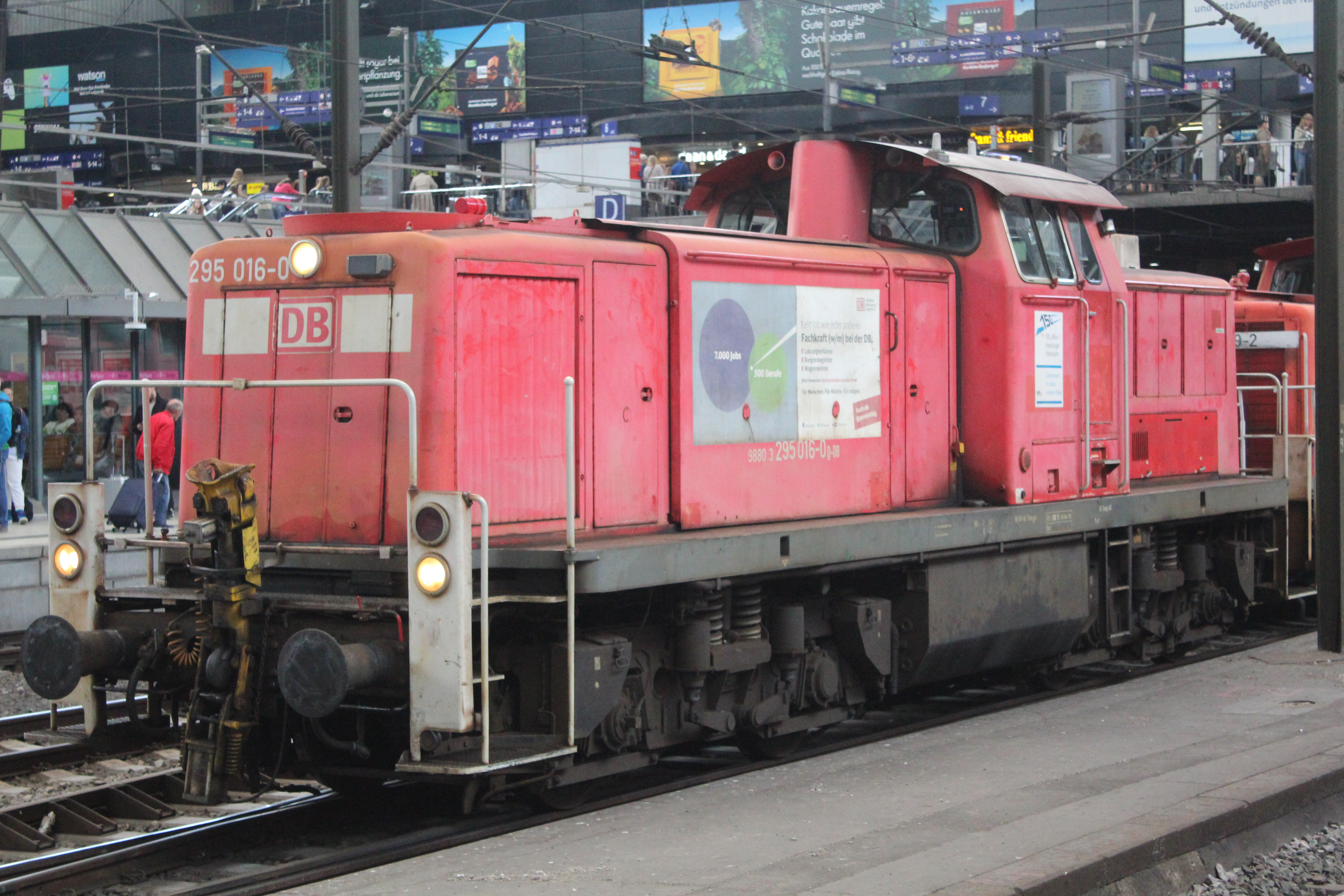
- DB Cargo 295 016-0 leading two other light engines through Hamburg Hbf (2023)
Type and origin
- Builder: MaK
- Serial number: 290 001-407 also 290 999 (290 408); 291 (~100 built)
- Build date: 1963, 1964–1974
Specifications
- Configuration
  - UIC: B′B′
- Gauge: 1,435 mm (4 ft 8 1/2 in) standard gauge
- Length: ~14 m (45 ft 11.2 in)
- Axle load: ~20 tonnes (20 long tons; 22 short tons)
- Loco weight: ~80 tonnes (79 long tons; 88 short tons)
- Fuel type: Diesel fuel
- Transmission: Hydraulic
- Safety systems: Sifa and Indusi
Performance figures
- Maximum speed: Class 290 001 to 290 020 : 70 km/h (43 mph); Class 290 021 onwards : 80 km/h (50 mph)
- Power output: Class 290 001 to 290 020 : 820 kW (1,100 hp); Class 290 021 onwards : 1,010 kW (1,350 hp); Class 290 rebuilt 1,100 kW (1,500 hp); Class 291 : 1,000 kW (1,300 hp)
- Tractive effort: Starting 201 kN (45,000 lb_{f})
Career
- Locale: Germany
- Current owner: Deutsche Bahn AG

The DB Class V90 (after 1968 the DB Class 290) locomotive is a German diesel-hydraulic locomotive for shunting and freight hauling.

== History and design ==
The DB Class V90 locomotives are similar to DB Class V 100 (Class 211 & 212) locomotives, they stemmed from a need for a heavy shunting locomotive - it was originally planned to create a heavy shunting variant of the V 100 (ballasted and with reinforced frame) to be produced, but this did not come to pass due to the design's stability problems.

Maschinenbau Kiel in co-operation with BZA München designed a longer and heavier locomotive, of a completely new design. In 1964, a pilot production of 20 of these were manufactured with a 1,100 horsepower (820 kW) engine as used in the DB Class V100.1 and a 70 km/h top speed.

In 1974 the first locomotive of the main production was produced - these locomotives had the 1,350 horsepower (1,010 kW) engine used in the DB Class V100.2 and a top speed of 80 km/h (50 mph). The locomotive length was also extended to 14.32 m (47 ft 0 in). By 1974 408 had been built by MaK, Deutz, Henschel and Jung.

The machines have both a Dead-man's vigilance device (German:Sifa) and "Inductive train control system" (German:Indusi) (see Punktförmige Zugbeeinflussung) safety devices.

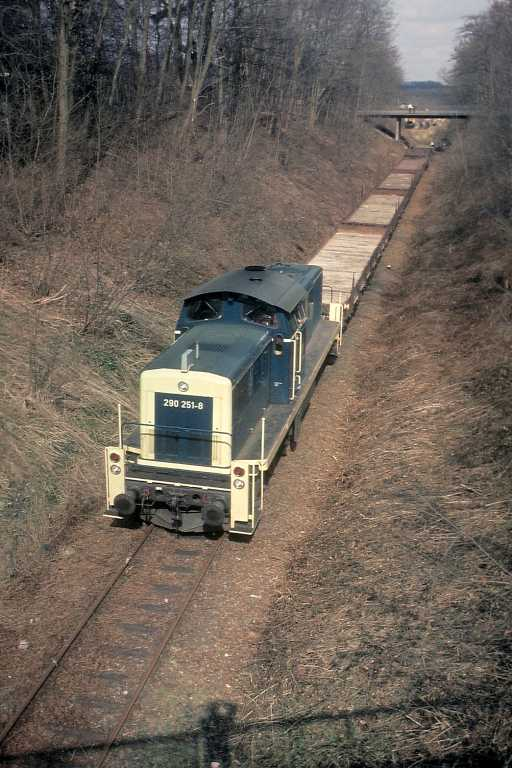
A Class 290 in the blue/ivory colour scheme

The locomotives were originally deep red (RAL 3004), in the mid-1970s a new ivory / ocean blue (RAL 5020 - RAL 1014) colour scheme was introduced, in the second half of the 1980s an eastern red (RAL 3031) color scheme was used and since the late 1990s, the locomotives are found in the current traffic (RAL 3020) red of Deutsche Bahn AG.

Since 2003, the locomotives have been upgraded with a new 1,100 kW (1,500 hp) engine (type 8V 4000 R41 MTU) equipped, as well as other components being upgraded (specifically the hydraulic drive). The modernised locos save fuel despite having a higher rated engine. The serial number of the remotored locomotives is increased by 500 (e.g. 290 030 becomes 290 530).

=== 290 999 of the Bundeswehr ===
One locomotive of the class was procured by the Army for use in an Air Force supply regiment in Mechernich and given the locomotive code 290 999; on loan from the Deutsche Bundesbahn.

Since January 1996 the locomotive became the property of Deutsche Bahn AG and has been given the number 290 408. After this locomotives conversion to radio control it has been numbered 294 408

== MaK V 90 P / DB Class 291 ==
Before the main production began, MaK had produced five locomotives of very similar type (but with a MaK engine) for assessment for export orders; they were tested in Sweden. (Note: No orders came initially but in 1972 a derivative the MaK G 1600 BB was produced for some German private users) The locomotives were called V 90 P (Note: Mak "V 90 P": P is for private (companies) not for prototype.) The first two went to Dortmunder Eisenbahn.

The other three locomotives were leased by the Deutsche Bundesbahn for assessment - they had a requirement for heavy shunting locomotives in the ports of Hamburg, Emden and Bremen. These locomotives were classified as V 90 901 to V 90 903 (later as DB Class 291 901 onwards). In 1972 the locomotives were purchased, and in 1974 the main order of 100 further locomotives came - which were slightly lighter than the "P" locomotives. The majority were built at Kiel with ten of the hundred being built by Jung.

Instead of the V12 engine found in the Class 290 (class 212), the 291 class is equipped with a MaK 8-cylinder in-line engine that produces 1,400 horsepower (1,000 kW).

This type is only used for shunting (requiring high torque at low speed). The marine diesel engine is unsuitable for continuous use on the main line. The machines found use mainly in northern Germany.

== Radio controlled versions ==
Two types of radio remote control have been utilised in order to make better use of these locomotives.

Initially locomotives were equipped with radio equipment which allowed the Bergmeister (or Rückenmeister) (The yard hump controller) to control the locomotive. A driver still occupied the locomotive for safety reasons, and to control the locomotive. This method was used in large computer controlled marshalling yards such as Mannheim marshalling yard (German:Mannheim rbf), Seelze, Maschen, Munich, Kornwestheim Rbf and Nuremberg.

Since Nuremberg Rbf has a downward gradient of the track (see Gravity Yard), the locomotives are coupled to 6-axle flat wagons converted to brake tenders by being loaded with concrete weights. This makes it is possible for them to stop trains of up to 2,000 t (2,200 short tons).

=== Classes 294, 295 ===
From 1995, large numbers of locomotives of the class were fitted a different type of radio remote produced by Krauss-Maffei (KM)

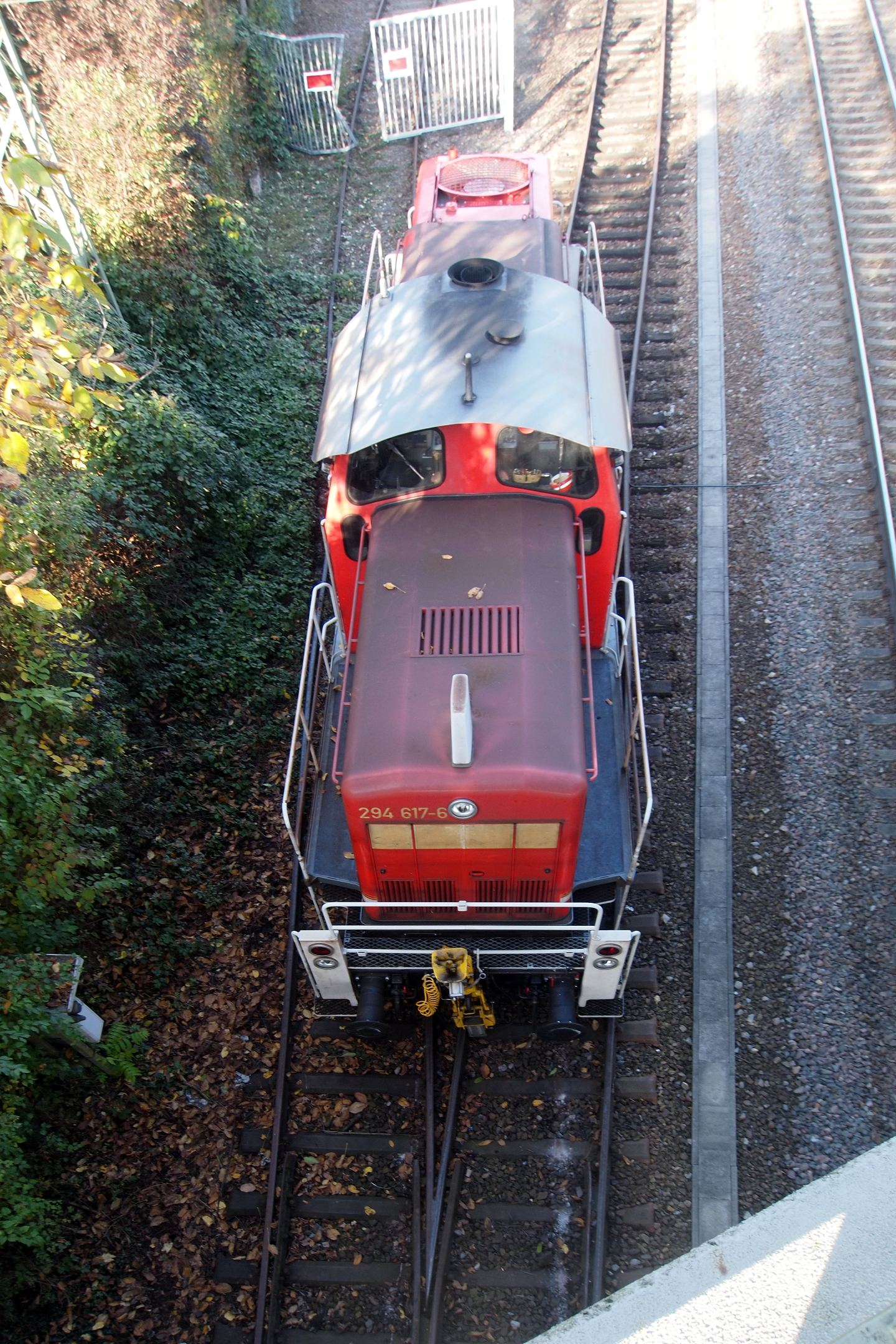
top view of a (derailed) 294

The remote device is carried by remote train driver (German:Lokrangierführer LRF ) in a so-called "Belly Box" (see Remote control locomotive for details) and operated in a manner similar to that of a toy car or model aircraft remote control.

This type of control is used in shunting operations and was previously used with smaller shunting locomotives such as the DB Class V 60 and DB Class Köf III (DB class 331 to 335)

The rebuilt locomotives of the 290 series form Class 294, rebuilt locomotives of the 291 series form Class 295

The locomotives have radio receiver in the cab, the LRF (remote train driver) must manually turn on the locomotive cab radio using a key switch on the locomotives control panel. A vehicle equipped with this type of remote control has a lamp above the cab window that lights to indicate that the locomotive is capable of receiving the radio signal. This means that the remote train driver (LRF) can now operate the locomotive at the trackside.

Various functions can be activated remotely - brakes, start, Vkonstant: i.e. running speed is automatically maintained, Sand, clutch etc.

=== Class 296 ===
In 2007 locomotives of Class 290 which already had radio control for use in marshalling yards had the newer Krauss-Maffei remote fitted as well, allowing trackside control. These units were given the classification Class 296 and are found in the marshalling yards at Gremberg, Mannheim, Munich and Northern Seelze.

45 locomotives are expected to be rebuilt to have both types of remote control.

== Future ==
Deutsche Bahn AG has announced that the diesel locomotives of series 291 and 295 will be replaced with Voith Gravita locomotives from 2010 onwards.
