= Stadensen =

- Ortsteil of Wrestedt
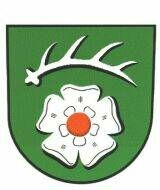
- Coat of arms
- Interactive map of Stadensen
- Location within Germany Location within Lower Saxony
- Coordinates: 52°53′N 10°33′E
- Country: Germany
- State: Lower Saxony
- District: Uelzen
- Municipality: Wrestedt
- Subdivisions: 7

Area
  - Total: 53.6 km^{2} (20.7 sq mi)
- Elevation: 53 m (174 ft)

Population (2010-12-31)
  - Total: 1,237
  - Density: 23.1/km^{2} (59.8/sq mi)
- Time zone: UTC+01:00 (CET)
  - Summer (DST): UTC+02:00 (CEST)
- Postal codes: 29559
- Dialling codes: 05802
- Vehicle registration: UE
- Website: www.stadensen.de

Stadensen is a village and former municipality in the district of Uelzen, in Lower Saxony, Germany. Since 1 November 2011 it has been part of the municipality of Wrestedt.
