= Wrestedt =

- Municipality
- Flag Coat of arms

- Location of Wrestedt within Uelzen district
- Interactive map of Wrestedt
- Location within Germany Location within Lower Saxony
- Coordinates: 52°54′N 10°35′E
- Country: Germany
- State: Lower Saxony
- District: Uelzen
- Municipal assoc.: Aue
- Subdivisions: 6

Government
  - Mayor: Heinz-Hermann Schulze (CDU)

Area
  - Total: 141.37 km^{2} (54.58 sq mi)
- Elevation: 51 m (167 ft)

Population (2025-12-31)
  - Total: 6,099
  - Density: 43.14/km^{2} (111.7/sq mi)
- Time zone: UTC+01:00 (CET)
  - Summer (DST): UTC+02:00 (CEST)
- Postal codes: 29559
- Dialling codes: 05802
- Vehicle registration: UE
- Website: www.wrestedt.de

Wrestedt (German pronunciation: [ˈvʁeːʃtɛt]) is a municipality in the district of Uelzen, in Lower Saxony, Germany. It is situated approximately 7 km south of Uelzen. Wrestedt is the seat of the Samtgemeinde ("collective municipality") Aue, which consists of the municipalities Bad Bodenteich, Lüder, Soltendieck, and Wrestedt.

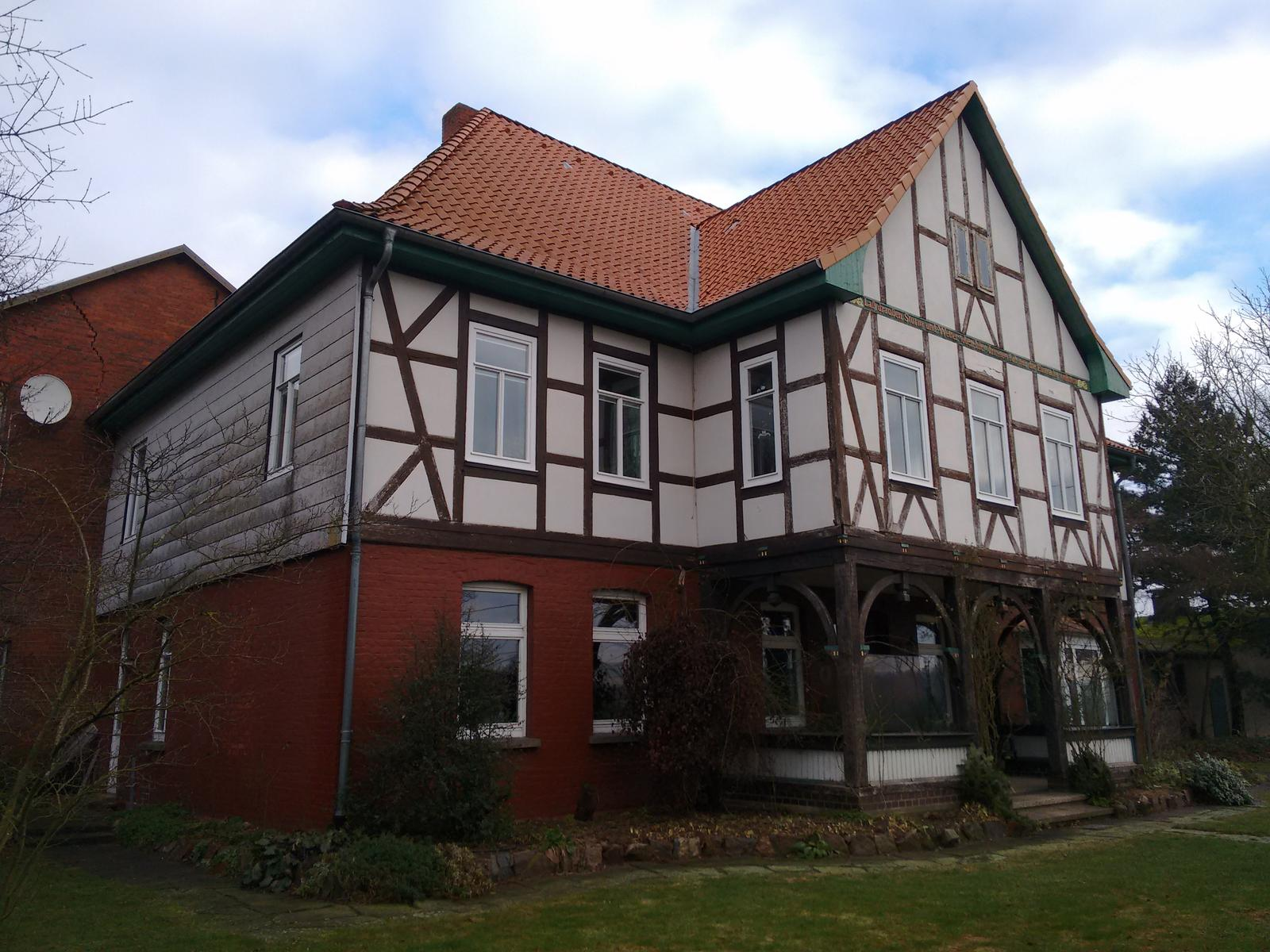
Alcove house in Drohe
