= Canton of Caumont-l'Éventé =

Coordinates: 49°07′02″N 0°46′43″W

The canton of Caumont-l'Éventé is a former canton in the Calvados département in northwestern France. It had 6,419 inhabitants (2012). It was disbanded following the French canton reorganisation which came into effect in March 2015.

It comprised 14 communes: Anctoville, Caumont-l'Éventé, Cormolain, Foulognes, Hottot-les-Bagues, La Lande-sur-Drôme, Livry, Longraye, Saint-Germain-d'Ectot, Sainte-Honorine-de-Ducy, Sallen, Sept-Vents, Torteval-Quesnay and La Vacquerie.
