= 50th (Northumbrian) Infantry Division =

Infantry division of the British Army

50th (Northumbrian) Motor Division 50th (Northumbrian) Infantry Division 50th Infantry (Reserve) Division
- Insignia of the 50th Division (Twin 'T's symbolic of 'Tyne-Tees')
- Active: 1920–1945; 1947–1961
- Country: United Kingdom
- Branch: Territorial Army
- Type: Infantry
- Role: Motorised infantry Infantry
- Size: 1944–1945 war establishment strength: 18,347 men (Note: This is the war establishment, the on-paper strength, of a British infantry division for 1944/1945.)
- Engagements: World War II; Battle of France; Western Desert Campaign; Tunisia Campaign; Operation Husky; Operation Overlord; Normandy landings; Gold Beach; Operation Market Garden

The 50th (Northumbrian) Infantry Division was an infantry division of the British Army that saw distinguished service in the Second World War. Pre-war, the division was part of the Territorial Army (TA) and the two Ts in the divisional insignia represent the two main rivers of its recruitment area, namely the rivers Tyne, and Tees. The division served in almost all of the major engagements of the European War from 1940 until late 1944 and also served with distinction in North Africa, the Mediterranean and Middle East from mid-1941 to 1943. The 50th Division was one of two British divisions (the other being the 3rd Infantry) to land in Normandy on D-Day, 6 June 1944, where it landed on Gold Beach. Four men of the division were awarded the Victoria Cross during the war, more than any other division of the British Army during the Second World War.

== Inter-war period ==
In 1921, the Territorial Force was reconstituted as the Territorial Army following the passage of the Territorial Army and Militia Act 1921. (Note: The Territorial Army was the reserve of the British regular army, made up of part-time volunteers. Its intended role was to be the sole method of expanding the size of the British armed forces (compared to the creation of Kitchener's Army during the First World War). First Line territorial formations would create a second line division using a cadre of trained personal and, if needed, a third division would also be created. All Territorial Army recruits were required to take the general service obligation meaning that, if the British Government decided, territorial soldiers could be deployed overseas for combat. (This avoided the complications with the Territorial Force, whose members were not required to leave the United Kingdom unless they volunteered for overseas service.)) This resulted in the 50th (Northumbrian) Infantry Division being formed. It contained the same infantry brigades as before, the 149th (4th to 7th Battalions Royal Northumberland Fusiliers), 150th (4th Battalion, East Yorkshire Regiment, 4th and 5th Green Howards and 5th Durham Light Infantry), and 151st (6th to 9th battalions Durham Light Infantry).

=== Motor division ===
British military doctrine development during the inter-war period resulted in the three kinds of divisions by the end of the 1930s: the infantry division, the mobile division (later called the armoured division), and the motor division. Historian David French wrote "The main role of the infantry ... was to break into the enemy's defensive position." This would then be exploited by the Mobile division, followed by the motor divisions that would "carry out the rapid consolidation of the ground captured by the Mobile divisions" therefore "transform[ing] the 'break-in' into a 'break-through." As a result, in 1938, the army decided to create six such Motor Divisions from Territorial Army units. Only three infantry divisions were converted into motor divisions prior to the war, this included the 50th alongside the 55th (West Lancashire) and the 1st London. The reform intended to reduce the division from three to two brigades along with a similar reduction in artillery. French wrote that the motor division "matched that of the German army's motorized and light divisions. But there the similarities ended." German motorized divisions contained three brigades and were as fully equipped as a regular infantry division, while the smaller light divisions contained a tank battalion. Whereas the motor division, while being fully motorized and capable of transporting all their infantry, contained no tanks and was "otherwise much weaker than normal infantry divisions" or their German counterparts.

Following this, some of the division's infantry battalions were converted to anti-aircraft regiments, (Note: The 5th Battalion, Royal Northumberland Fusiliers became the 53rd Searchlight Regiment, the 5th Durham Light Infantry split into the 1/5th and 2/5th Battalions to become the 55th and 54th Searchlight Regiments respectively, and the 7th D.L.I. became the 47th Searchlight Regiment.) and the entire 149th Brigade was converted into divisional support units for other formations. (Note: The 4th R.N.F. to a motorcycle battalion, the 6th to a tank battalion (43rd Royal Tank Regiment) and the 7th to a machine gun battalion,)

=== Buildup to the Second World War ===
Throughout the 1930s, tensions built between Germany and the United Kingdom and its allies. During late 1937 and 1938, German demands for the annexation of Sudetenland in Czechoslovakia led to an international crisis. To avoid war, the British Prime Minister, Neville Chamberlain, met with the German Chancellor Adolf Hitler in September and came to the Munich Agreement, the German annexation of Sudetenland. Chamberlain had intended the agreement to lead to further peaceful resolution of differences, but relations between both countries soon deteriorated. On 15 March 1939, Germany breached the terms of the agreement by invading and occupying the remnants of the Czech state.

On 29 March, the British Secretary of State for War Leslie Hore-Belisha announced plans to increase the Territorial Army (TA) from 130,000 men to 340,000, doubling the number of divisions. The plan was for the existing divisions to recruit over their establishments and then form Second Line divisions from small cadres that could be built upon. This was aided by an increase in pay for territorials, the removal of restrictions on promotion that had been a major hindrance to recruiting during the preceding years, the construction of better quality barracks and an increase in supper-time rations. The 23rd (Northumbrian) Division was to be created as a Second Line unit, a duplicate of the 50th (Northumbrian). Despite the intention for the army to grow, the programme was complicated by a lack of central guidance on the expansion and duplication process and issues regarding the lack of facilities, equipment and instructors. It had been envisioned by the War Office that the duplicating process and recruiting the required numbers of men would take no more than six months. The 50th (Northumbrian) Motor Division started this process in March, creating new units based around an initial cadre of just 25 officers and men. In April, limited conscription was introduced. At that time 34,500 militiamen, all aged 20, were conscripted into the regular army, initially to be trained for six months before being deployed to the forming second line units. The process varied widely in the TA divisions. Some were ready in weeks while others had made little progress by the time the Second World War began.

== Opening months, France and the BEF ==
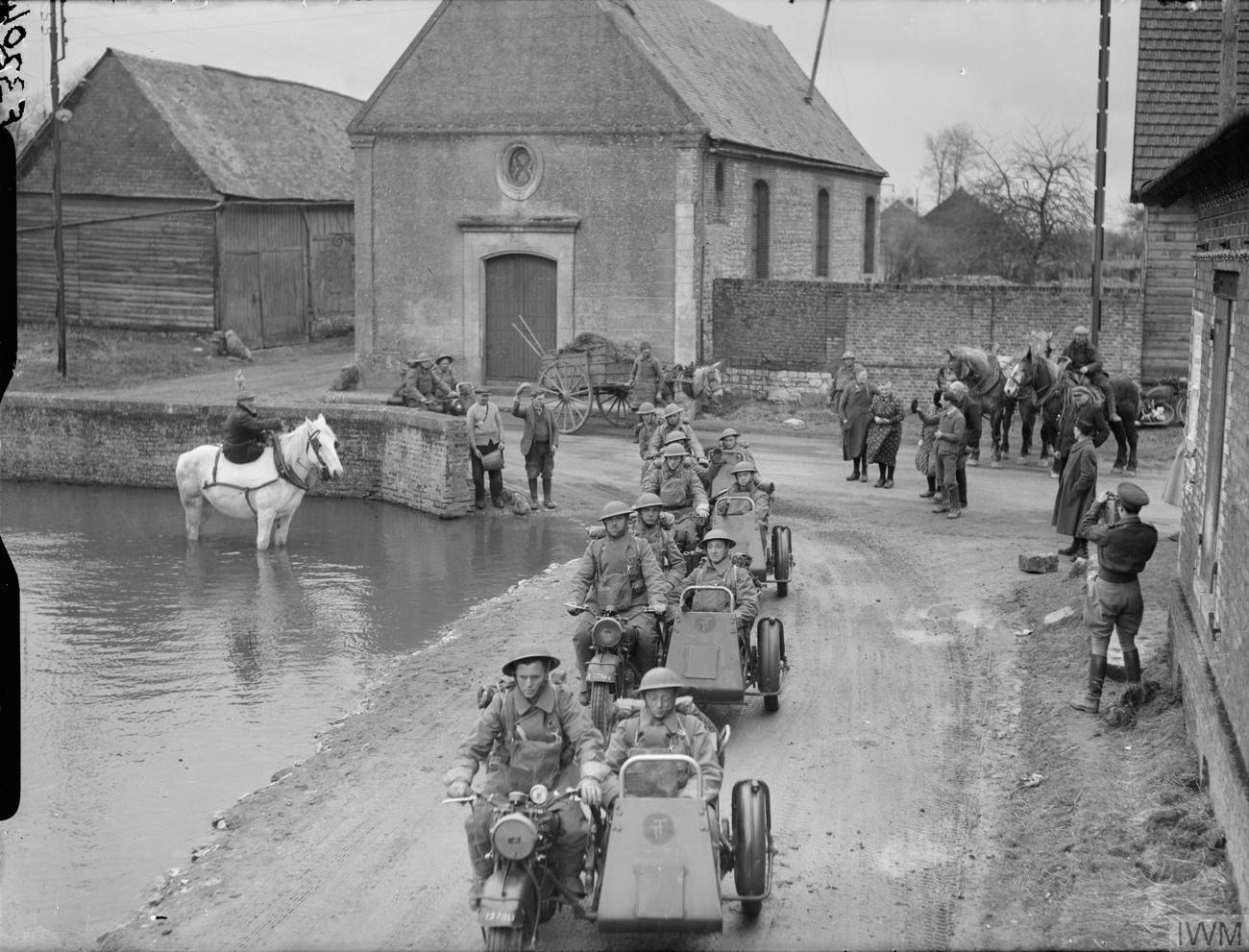
Motorcycle combinations of the 4th Battalion, Royal Northumberland Fusiliers pass through a village, watched by the local inhabitants, France, 20 March 1940.

The division, along with most of the rest of the TA, was mobilised on 1 September 1939, the day the German Army invaded Poland. From the new units it created in March, the 50th Division created the 69th Infantry Brigade as a Second Line duplicate of the 150th Infantry Brigade, and the 70th Infantry Brigade as a Second Line duplicate of the 151st Infantry Brigade. These brigades had been created by the outbreak of the war and were administered by the 50th Division until the 23rd (Northumbrian) divisional headquarters was formed on 2 October 1939. At this point, they were transferred to the new division.

The war-time deployment of the TA envisioned the divisions being deployed singly, to reinforce the regular army that had already been dispatched to the European mainland, as equipment became available. The plan envisioned the deployment of the whole TA in waves, as divisions completed their training. The final divisions would not be transported to France until a year had elapsed from the outbreak of war. In October, the division was concentrated in the Cotswolds to train for overseas service, which continued into the winter. In January 1940, the division was moved to France to join the British Expeditionary Force (BEF). The division disembarked at Cherbourg on 19 January 1940, and was assigned to II Corps. By March, the division was at work preparing the defences in the Lille—Loos area.

When the German attack began on 10 May, the British and French enacted their Dyle Plan and advanced to the River Dyle in Belgium. The next day, the 25th Infantry Brigade and other supporting units were added to the division while it was in reserve on the Belgian border. It was ordered to move on 16 May, and the division headed towards Brussels and took up positions on the river Dender, only to end up part of the Allied withdrawal. By 19 May, it was on Vimy ridge, north of Arras. It had become known to the Allies that the German Army's southern spearheads had pierced the Peronne–Cambrai gap and were threatening Boulogne and Calais, cutting the BEF's lines of communication and separating it from the main French armies. A plan by French General Maxime Weygand to close this gap between the French and British forces included Frankforce (after Major-General Harold Franklyn, GOC of the 5th Division), consisting of the 5th and 50th Divisions and the 1st Army Tank Brigade attacking southward, and French divisions attacking northward from around Cambrai.

=== Arras ===
The Arras counter-attack, 21 May 1940.

Instead of divisions, the attack was made by two battalion sized columns, with many tanks of the armoured units already unserviceable. Of the 5th Infantry Division's two brigades, one had been sent to hold the line of the river Scarpe to the east of Arras, together with the 150th Brigade of the 50th Division, while the other was in reserve. The two columns comprised the 6th and 8th Battalions of the Durham Light Infantry (D.L.I.) of 151st Brigade supporting the 4th and 7th Royal Tank Regiment (R.T.R.), one of each in both columns, artillery and other supporting troops, totalling 74 tanks and around 2,000 men. Attacking on 21 May, the right column (8th D.L.I. and 7th R.T.R.) initially made rapid progress, taking the villages of Duisans and Warlus and a number of German prisoners but they soon ran into German infantry and Waffen-SS, and were counterattacked by Stukas and tanks and had many casualties. The left column (6th D.L.I. and 4th R.T.R.) also enjoyed early success, taking Danville, Beaurains and reaching the planned objective of Wancourt before running into opposition from the infantry units of Generalmajor Erwin Rommel's 7th Panzer Division.

French tanks and troop carriers enabled British soldiers to evacuate Warlus, and the carriers of the 9th Durham Light Infantry (in reserve) helped those in Duisans withdraw to their former positions that night. Next day the Germans regrouped and continued their advance; Frankforce had taken around 400 German prisoners and inflicted a similar number of casualties, as well as destroying a number of tanks. The attack had been so effective that 7th Panzer Division believed it had been attacked by five infantry divisions. The attack also made the German commanders of Panzergruppe von Kleist nervous, with forces left behind to guard lines of communication.

=== Withdrawal to Dunkirk ===
By now Arras was becoming a salient in the German lines and increasingly vulnerable. The four Brigades of the 5th and 50th Divisions (Note: The 13th, 17th, 150th and 151st Brigades. The 25th Brigade had been reallocated from the 50th to 'Polforce', defending the canal line between Béthune and La Brasse.) were becoming hard pressed and on the night of 23–24 May received orders to withdraw to the canal line. After fighting on the canal line the 5th and 50th Divisions were withdrawn north to Ypres to fill a threatening gap developing between the Belgian Army and the BEF, after a strong German attack on the Belgians on 25 May. It was late on 27 May when the 50th Division arrived at Ypres to find their positions already being shelled and the Belgian Army being pushed north-eastwards away from them. The gap was covered by the side-stepping 3rd Division the next day. On that day (28 May) the Belgians surrendered, opening up a 20-mile gap south from the English Channel, which the Germans aimed to exploit rapidly . The division was now ordered to form a line east of Poperinghe, with the 3rd Division east of them up to Lizerne, this was done by the morning of 29 May, forming the southern edge of the Dunkirk corridor. In contact with the Germans from the start the 50th Division was forced back and by late 30 May was in the eastern end of the Dunkirk perimeter. The division was reinforced by some remnants from the 23rd (Northumbrian) Division on 31 May, which were needed as the Germans continued to attack and shell the 50th Division's positions. Withdrawn to the beach on 1 June, the 151st Brigade was informed it may be used in a diversionary attack to cover the evacuation and formed two columns, but this became unnecessary. That night the 50th Division was evacuated from the beaches (150th Brigade, RASC and gunners) and the Mole (151st Brigade and others), with Lieutenant-General Brooke having estimated its strength on 30 May at 2,400 men. (Note: For example, the 8th Battalion, Durham Light Infantry lost 46 men killed in action during the campaign.)

== Home Defence ==
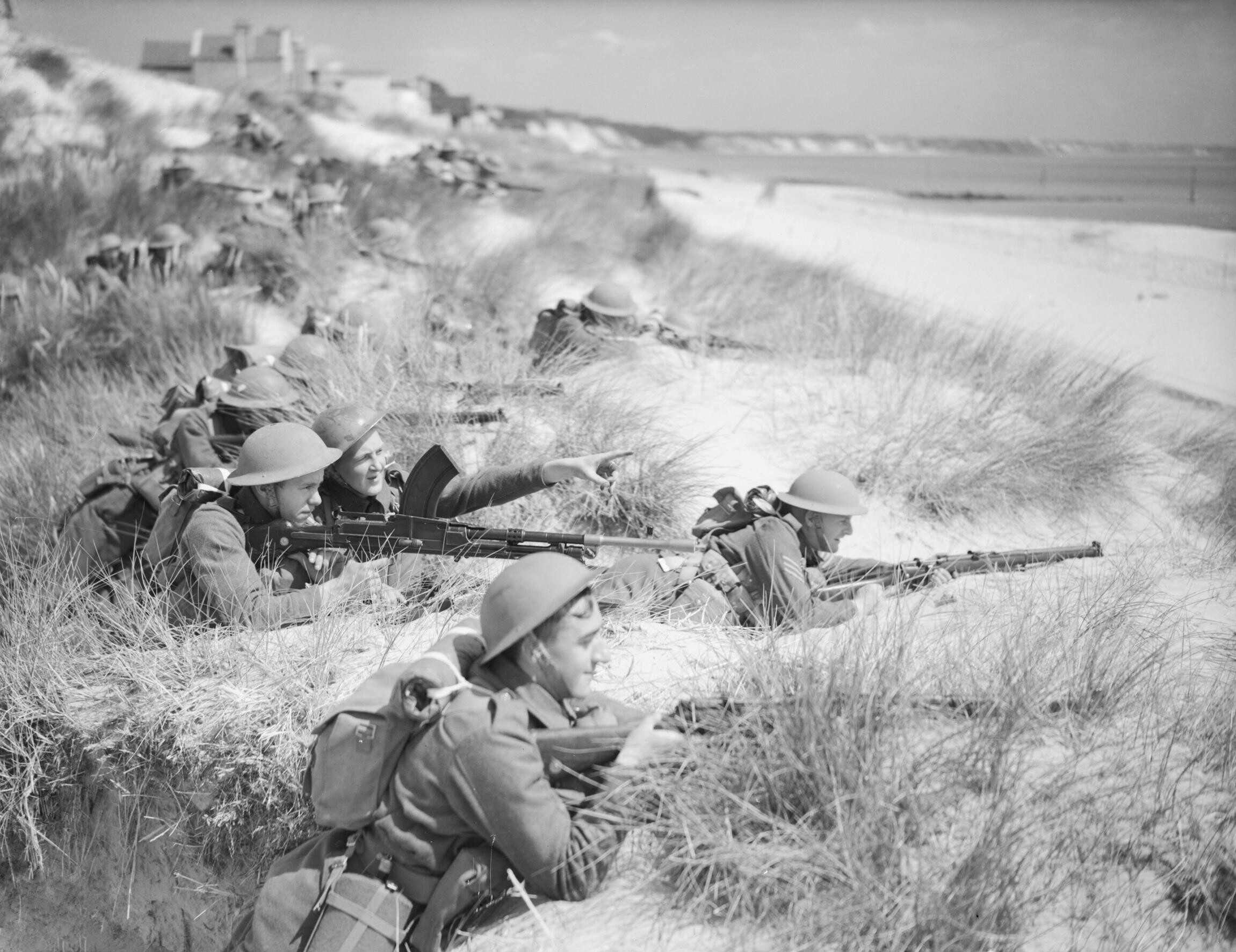
Men of the 7th Battalion, Green Howards among the sand dunes at Sandbanks, near Poole, Dorset, 31 July 1940.

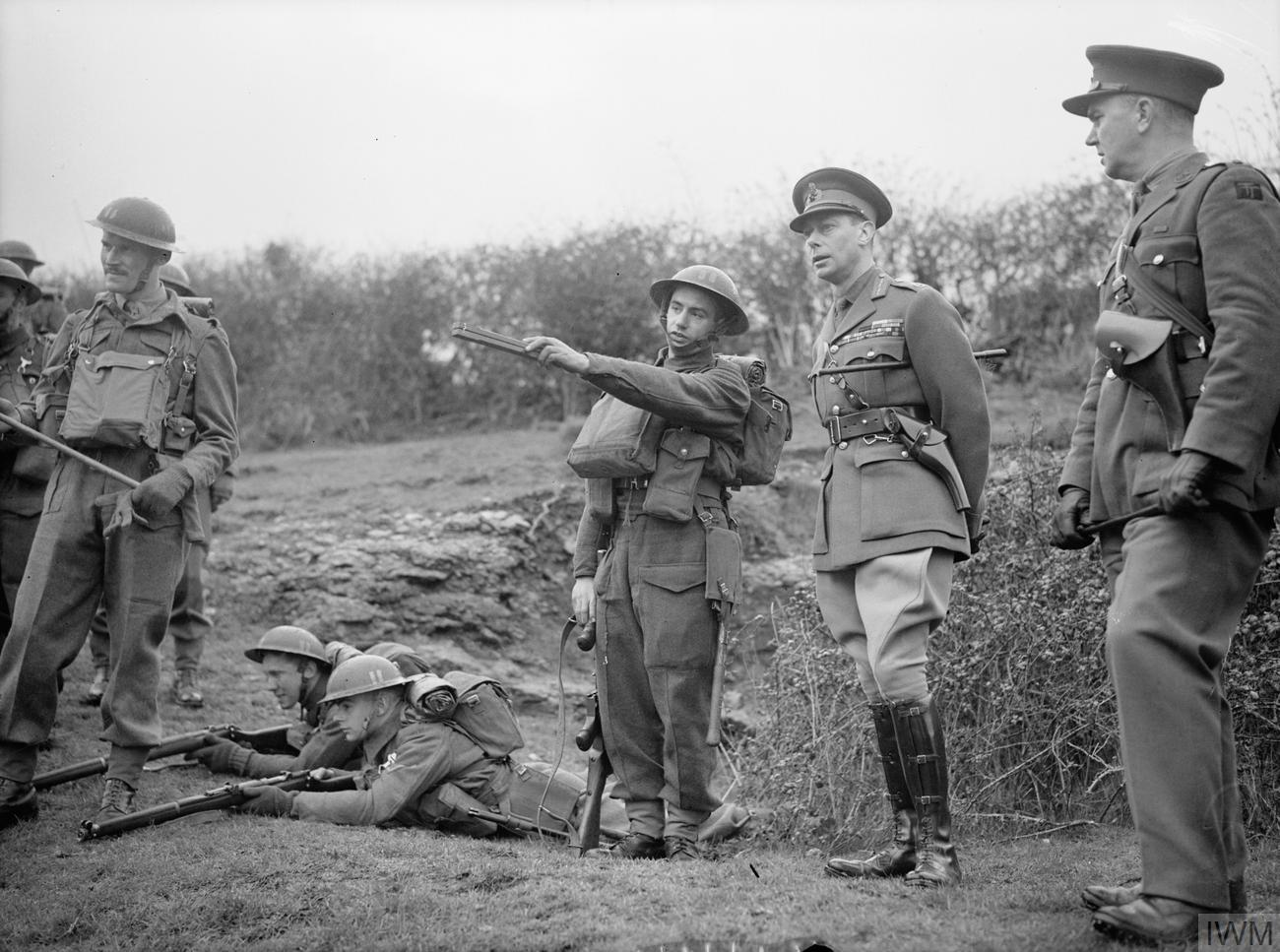
King George VI watches troops taking part in manoeuvres during a visit to the 50th Division in Southern Command, 2 April 1941.

While in Britain the division made good its losses with new recruits and convalescents, and was converted into a three brigade infantry division with the permanent addition, of the 69th Infantry Brigade group, at the end of June. This comprised the 5th East Yorkshire Regiment, 6th and 7th Green Howards with supporting artillery and engineers, from the now disbanded 23rd (Northumbrian) Division, which had been badly mauled in France. It became part of V Corps on anti-invasion duty, stationed initially in and to the West of Bournemouth, later on the North coast of Somerset, after having transferred, on 22 November, to VIII Corps.

The 50th Division was first informed of an overseas move in September 1940 to North Africa, and embarkation leave was given over Christmas. After intensive exercises on the moors of Somerset and Devon, another grant of embarkation leave was given in March 1941, and on 22 April the division HQ and 150th Brigade Group sailed from Liverpool. (Note: The convoy consisted of the Canadian Pacific liners RMS Empress of Asia and RMS Empress of Russia, HMS Repulse, 14 destroyers and an armed merchantmen. The stokers of the Empress of Asia deserted at Cape Town, and the troops had to stoke the ship through the heat of the Red Sea.) The remainder of the division, now commanded by Major-General William Ramsden, sailed from Glasgow on 23 May. (Note: The convoy consisted of the troopships SS Duchess of Richmond and MV Georgic (at least) HMS Exeter, an aircraft carrier, and anti-aircraft cruiser and nine destroyers.) While in the North Atlantic the majority of the escorts of the Glasgow convoy were diverted away to search for the Bismarck leaving only the cruiser HMS Exeter as the convoy's escort.

== Mediterranean and the Middle East ==
In June the division landed at Port Tewfik, where the 150th Brigade and Division H.Q. was immediately sent to plan defences around Alamein. The rest of the division was sent to Cyprus, where it constructed defences on the island, especially around the airport and city of Nicosia. Reunited in July, the division continued its work in the island's pleasant surroundings, leaving in November, relieved by the 5th Indian Infantry Division. Landing in Haifa, the 150th Brigade was stripped of its vehicles and the other two brigades travelled on to Iraq, crossing the Syrian Desert to Baghdad, then beyond Kirkuk, building defences on the crossings of Great Zab and Kazir rivers. In December the 69th Brigade was sent to Baalbek in Syria to relieve the 6th Australian Division which was returning to Australia. In February 1942 the 69th and 151st Brigades were recalled to Egypt.

== North Africa ==
The 150th Brigade had returned to the Western Desert in November 1941. After training around Bir Thalata, it was ordered into Libya and saw action, capturing eight guns and a prisoner from the Afrika Korps. Directed to the Bir Hakeim position it erected wire, laid mines and dug trenches. Exchanging with the Free French in February 1942 it moved north, and rejoining the rest of the division took over a 25 miles (40 km) section of the Gazala Line from the 4th Indian Division. The Gazala Line was a series of defensive "boxes", protected by mine-fields and wire and with little showing above ground, each occupied by a brigade of infantry with attached artillery, engineers and a field ambulance. The brigades' B echelons, with stores and motor transport, were sited some miles to the rear. In the event of an Axis attack, these boxes were intended to pin down the attacking forces while the British 1st and 7th Armoured Divisions attacked them in turn. Close by to the north was the 1st South African Division, isolated to the south were the Free French. Other boxes were sited to the rear of the main line, such as the Knightsbridge Box.

Patrols began, with the aims of gathering intelligence and disrupting German and Italian operations. These ranged in size from two to three platoons of infantry and anti tank guns, to battalion sized formations containing most of the arms of the division. One such operation, Fullsize, launched at the end of March consisted of three columns and was commanded by Brigadier John Nichols, commander of the 151st Brigade, who would later command the 50th Division. This ranged up to 30 miles (48 km) from Gazala to raid Luftwaffe landing grounds, in order to distract them from a Malta bound convoy.

At the end of April the 150th Brigade was moved south to relieve the 201st Guards Motor Brigade in a large box with a perimeter of 20 miles (32 km), 6 miles (9.7 km) from 69th Brigade to the north and 10 miles (16 km) from the Free French to the south.

=== Battle of Gazala ===
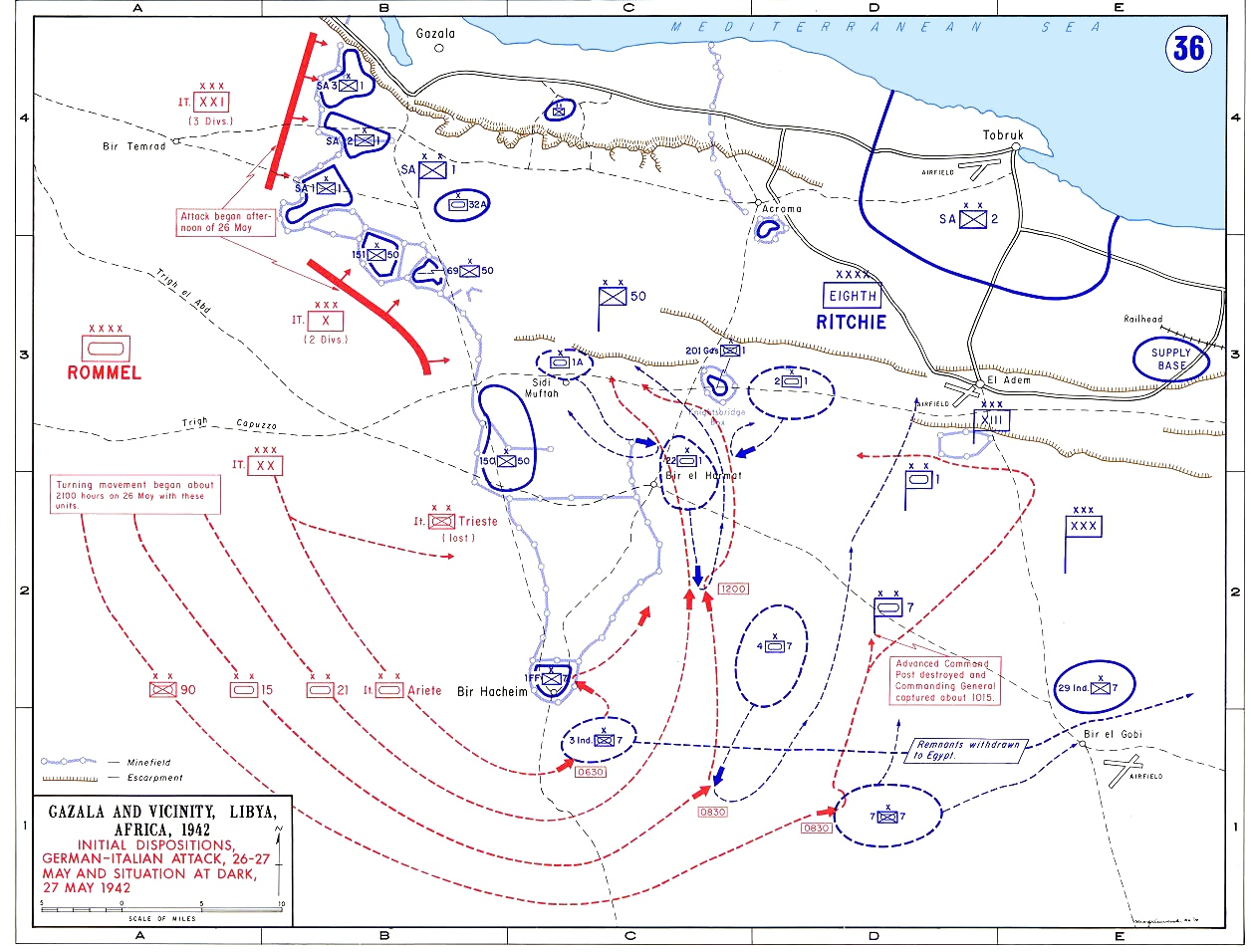
The Battle of Gazala in May 1942, in the vicinity of Tobruk.

By the middle of May the British were aware that Rommel intended to attack. On 26 May he launched a diversionary attack on the Gazala line, then the next day staged a wide sweeping movement around the left flank of the Gazala line at Bir Hakeim, then moved north behind it, while the Italians mounted diversionary attacks against the South Africans and 50th Division.

Intense fighting quickly developed behind the 150th Brigade box in an area known as The Cauldron, as four German and Italian armoured divisions fought and initially overran the British formations which were committed piecemeal to the battle. After two days, with the Free French holding out at Bir Hakeim, Rommel's supply situation was becoming desperate due to the long detour to the south, an increasing toll of tanks was being taken by the Desert Air Force (DAF). Some supplies reached Rommel through the weakly held mine fields north and south of the 150th Brigade box, but by 31 May the situation was again serious, such that General Fritz Bayerlein was considering surrender. Rommel had turned his attention to the 150th Brigade box as a means to shorten his lines of communication and began attacking it on 29 May from the rear, using parts of 15th Panzer, Trieste Motorised and 90th Light Divisions, supported by heavy bombing attacks. The box was gradually reduced over a stubborn defence, and it was overrun by noon on 1 June, with the capture of all three infantry battalions and attached artillery and engineers.

During this time the other brigades of the division, noting the flow of supplies in front of them, mounted vigorous patrols to disrupt and steal these supplies. Particularly prized was fresh water from the wells at Derna to supplement their own meagre ration, all other types of stores and weapons were taken as well as prisoners. (Note: On the Night of 6 June 220 Italians and some Germans were taken prisoner by one patrol from the 8th Battalion, D.L.I.) This commerce raiding continued until, after the withdrawal of the Free French on 10 June and the defeat of the remaining British armour on 13 June, the remaining Gazala boxes realised they were now almost cut off. On 14 June they received orders to withdraw.

==== Breakout ====
The coast road leading to the east could only hold one division while it was being held open by the remains of the British armour and the El Adem box, and this was allocated to the South Africans. The 50th Division was left with the alternatives of fighting east, through the German armoured formations or taking the long way around through the Italians to their front. Obliged to destroy all they could not take with them, the division formed mixed columns (infantry, artillery, engineers and supporting arms), which charged through bridgeheads formed by the 5th East Yorkshires and the 8th D.L.I. for their respective brigades and into the Italian lines. Leaving chaos and confusion in their wake, the columns headed further south around the routes the Germans took in their advance, then east and headed for Fort Maddelena on the Egyptian frontier.

The enemy in the bridgeheads were Italian stiffened by a few German gunners. They were very much taken by surprise. It was late at night before they realised that a whole division was passing straight through their lines. Some vehicles went up on mines, others were shot-up, but on the whole we had very few casualties and both attacking battalions did their jobs successfully. The infantry went in with the bayonet and the Italians departed, often leaving all their arms and equipment lying about in the trenches.

— Lt E H Moss, 50th Division Intelligence Officer

After having been posted behind the 69th Brigade box, and having seen the Italians alerted to the breakout, the 9th D.L.I., and a party from the 6th, took the coastal route . Attacked by German artillery and infantry and accidentally shelled by the South African's rearguard, the column fought through the Germans and even took prisoners. On 17 and 18 June the division was reassembled at Bir el Thalata.

=== Mersa Matruh ===
On 21 June Tobruk surrendered, and a new defensive line was made south of Mersa Matruh in similar brigade boxes to those at Gazala. In Mersa Martuh itself was the 10th Indian Infantry Division, south-east of the town, on an escarpment, was the 50th Division with a brigade of the 5th Indian Division south of them. The Germans attacked on 27 June and passed around the escarpment to the north and south. North of the 151st lay the coast road and the attack fell on the brigade and heavily on the 9th D.L.I. on the left flank. During the attack Private Adam Wakenshaw was to win a posthumous Victoria Cross (VC), the first of four to be awarded to members of the division, while manning an anti-tank gun. However, most of the battalion was overrun, (Note: Details of the rifle companies and the H.Q company escaped.) but the attack was not pressed further due to the Germans own heavy casualties. That night a large raid by the 6th and 8th D.L.I. and elements of the 5th Indian Division, was intended to disrupt German and Italian lines of communication south of the escarpment, but due to poor coordination succeeded in causing as much confusion to their own columns as to the enemy. The same night the 5th East Yorkshires was heavily engaged with the Germans. On the night of 28 June, with the division nearly surrounded, it was ordered to break out. Unlike the Gazala breakout, the battalion columns now faced German armour, and the ground was broken by steep-sided Wadis. The 8th D.L.I. was ambushed while driving out of a wadi and lost its D Company. The original orders had specified Fuka as the meeting point for the division, but this was in enemy hands, and some columns which had not been informed of this were captured.

The 50th Division had suffered over 9,000 casualties (Note: 8,000 casualties in Rissik.) since the start of the Gazala battle, lost much of its equipment and what remained was worn out. The division was sent into Mareopolis, south-west of Alexandria, to refit. The average strength of the remaining infantry battalions was 300 men (less than 50%), and the division artillery had only 30 guns (out of 72) and all other services had heavy losses. By mid-July the infantry had been reinforced to 400–500 men per battalion and training had begun.

=== Mitieriya Ridge ===
In late July the division, now commanded by Major-General John Nichols after Ramsden was promoted, was ordered to provide troops for an attack on Mitieriya Ridge, under the command of the 69th Brigade, the 5th East Yorkshires and 6th Green Howards (both reinforced by platoons from the 7th Green Howards) were joined by a composite D.L.I. battalion of three companies, one each from the battalions of 151st Brigade. The hasty plan called for the brigade to pass through a gap in the mine field and clear more mines to allow the 1st Armoured Division's 2nd Armoured Brigade to pass through during the night of 21–22 July. The 5th East Yorkshires and the composite D.L.I. battalion reached their objectives, the Germans having allowed them to pass through their lines. Surrounded, then shelled and mortared for two days, with the supporting armour unable to advance, they were overrun with only small numbers escaping.

=== Second Battle of El Alamein ===
In late July and August the division was part of the Northern Delta Force, together with the 26th Indian Infantry Brigade, the 1st Greek Brigade, the 2nd Free French Brigade and the Alexandria garrison. The division's artillery was loaned to XIII Corps as reinforcements. At the start of September the 151st Brigade was detached and placed under command of the 2nd New Zealand Division in the front line, and then with the 44th (Home Counties) Division later in the month, south of the Ruweisat Ridge. Here they patrolled no-man's land and engaged with patrols from the Italian 185th Infantry Division "Folgore" and Germans. On 10 October the remainder of the division entered the line reinforced with the 1st Greek Brigade, and deployed opposite the Deir el Munassib depression, Greeks to the north, the 151st Brigade in the centre and the 69th Brigade to the south.

On the night of 25 October, as part of the southern diversionary attacks, the 69th Brigade, 5th East Yorkshires and 6th Green Howards, advanced to clear the mine fields, and seize positions. After gaining nearly all of the first objectives, the attacking battalions came up against increasing numbers of anti-personnel mines, barbed wire and retaliatory mortar fire. After losing over 200 casualties, the battalions were withdrawn back to the front line. On the night of 28 October, the 151st Brigade was transferred north to join XXX Corps, and take part in Operation Supercharge.

==== Operation Supercharge ====
This operation began on the night of 31 October with an Australian attack keeping pressure on the Germans near the coast. Further south, timed for the early morning of 1 November, then delayed for 24 hours, the 151st Brigade with the 152nd Brigade, both under the command of the 2nd New Zealand Division, were to advance 4,000 yards to Tel el Aqqaqir on the Rahman Track, supported by tanks of 8th and 50th Royal Tank Regiments. Following them would be the 9th Armoured Brigade. The advance would be supported by a First World War style creeping barrage provided by 13 field regiments and two medium regiments of artillery. The 151st Brigade, supported by the 505th Field Company, Royal Engineers and the 149th Field Ambulance, was on the Northern edge of the advance, with the 28th (Māori) battalion providing the first half of their Northern flank, the second half would be formed by the 6th D.L.I performing a right wheel halfway through the advance. The infantry had a seven-mile march up to their starting lines during which time the objective were bombed by the DAF. Moving across the start line at 01:05hrs the infantry advanced into the smoke and dust of the barrage which reduced visibility to 50 yards.

The whole night to the east was broken by hundreds of gun flashes stabbing into the darkness. The shells whistled overhead to burst with a deafening crash in the target area, and from then, until the barrage closed about three hours later, the frightful shattering noise went on continually... Every twelve yards there was a shell hole.

— Col. Watson 6th D.L.I.

It was well organized. On each flank – on the battalion flanks – they had Bofors guns firing tracer every two or three minutes so that you could keep on line. The barrage was going for about two minutes then they'd drop two or three smoke bombs – they were a bloody nuisance... But when they dropped you knew the barrage was lifting. You just moved in.

— Pte Jackson Browne, 8th D.L.I.

In the advance through the German trenches and gun lines, some had been stunned by the bombardment, others fought back, with all three battalions coming under fire. Lines through the mines were cleared behind the advance, and by dawn, having reached their objective the infantry dug in, and were in place to witness the destruction of the 9th Armoured Brigade as it charged dug in German guns. Relieved in the early hours of 3 November, the brigade had suffered almost 400 casualties and taken more than 400 prisoners.

In the south, the remainder of the division, reinforced with the 2nd Free French Brigade, was tasked with clearing the mine fields between the Ruweiiat Ridge and the Rahman Track and capturing the defences around a point called 'Fortress A'. On 7 November the division was ordered to form a mobile brigade column and strike West. With all division vehicles given to the 69th Brigade and reinforced with anti-tank guns the column ambushed defensive posts and collected several thousand Italian prisoners, including the HQ of the Brescia Division. The 151st Brigade rejoined the division on 12 November.

The division now went into reserve as part of X Corps, and was grouped around El Adem on the Gazala battlefield where it received new anti-tank and anti-aircraft regiments and commenced intensive training. Various formations of the division were detached, transport platoons to carry supplies forward from Tobruk, the engineers to improve the docks and roads around Sirte and the anti-aircraft regiment to protect newly captured airfields. The division, still with only two infantry brigades, returned to the front line, where it joined Leese's XXX Corps, in mid-March 1943, when the Eighth Army reached the Mareth Line in Tunisia. (Note: The division's machine gun battalion (the 2nd Cheshires) and the anti-tank regiment (102nd) had been in action at the Battle of Medenine)

=== Mareth Line ===
Operation Pugilist, the attack against the Mareth Line was planned for the night of 19–20 March 1943. The Mareth Line was made up of a series of fortified positions, consisting of a number of pillboxes surrounded by wire and trenches, just behind the bank of the Wadi Zigzaou, backed up by a second line of such positions on a ridge to the rear. The 69th Brigade had taken the approaches to the Wadi on preceding nights, they were to attack a position called 'the Bastion' in front of the main line while the 151st Brigade supported by the 50th Royal Tank Regiment attacked the line proper to their right. The infantry were to be equipped with short wooden scaling ladders to climb the banks of the Wadi. None of the infantry battalions had regained their full strength, and opposing them were the Italian Young Fascist and the German 164th Light Divisions. It was planned that the 4th Indian Division would then pass through and continue the attack, while the 2nd New Zealand Division made a 'left hook'.

The attack began on the night of 20—21 March, on the left, Lieutenant Colonel Derek Anthony Seagrim, Commanding Officer (C.O.) of the 7th Green Howards, was awarded the V.C. in clearing two machine gun posts on 'the Bastion' which briefly held up the advance, the battalion took 200 prisoners and advanced across the Wadi. On the right the 151st Brigade took the front line positions in heavy fighting, but by dawn only four tanks had managed to cross the Wadi. The next day (21 March) reinforced by the 5th East Yorkshires, the brigade advanced and took three positions on the ridge and took several hundred Italian prisoners. More tanks had crossed over but most of them were armed only with the increasingly ineffective 2-pounder gun. The passage of these tanks had damaged the Wadi crossing and only a few anti-tank guns could be moved across. On 22 March, with the DAF grounded by rain, the Germans counterattacked with the 15th Panzer Division with supporting artillery and infantry.

By evening a bloody and desperate battle was being fought out west of the Wadi Zigzaou, and slowly but surely the infantry were being driven back to the Wadi edge, until by midnight except for the East Yorkshire Regiment holding out in [a fortified position on the bank of the Wadi] there was no depth whatever in the bridgehead. Though tremendous casualties had been inflicted by the supporting artillery ... they had failed to stop the enemy attack. Later even this support flagged as wireless sets with the forward troops were gradually knocked out or failed due to exhausted batteries. The men of the 6th, 8th and 9th DLI were inextricably mixed up, many without commanders, all hungry, tired and desperately short of ammunition. The whole area was lit up by the twenty seven derelict burning Valentine tanks of the 50th RTR fought to a standstill by superior enemy armour.

— Capt Ewart Clay, GSO3, 50th Division

The 151st Brigade were withdrawn that night, the 5th East Yorkshires on the night of 23/24 March. The 6th D.L.I had started the battle with only 300 men, and was now reduced to 65 uninjured, and the other battalions were in a similar state. The 2nd New Zealand Division's flanking attack began on 26 March and was to force an Axis withdrawal.

=== Wadi Akarit ===
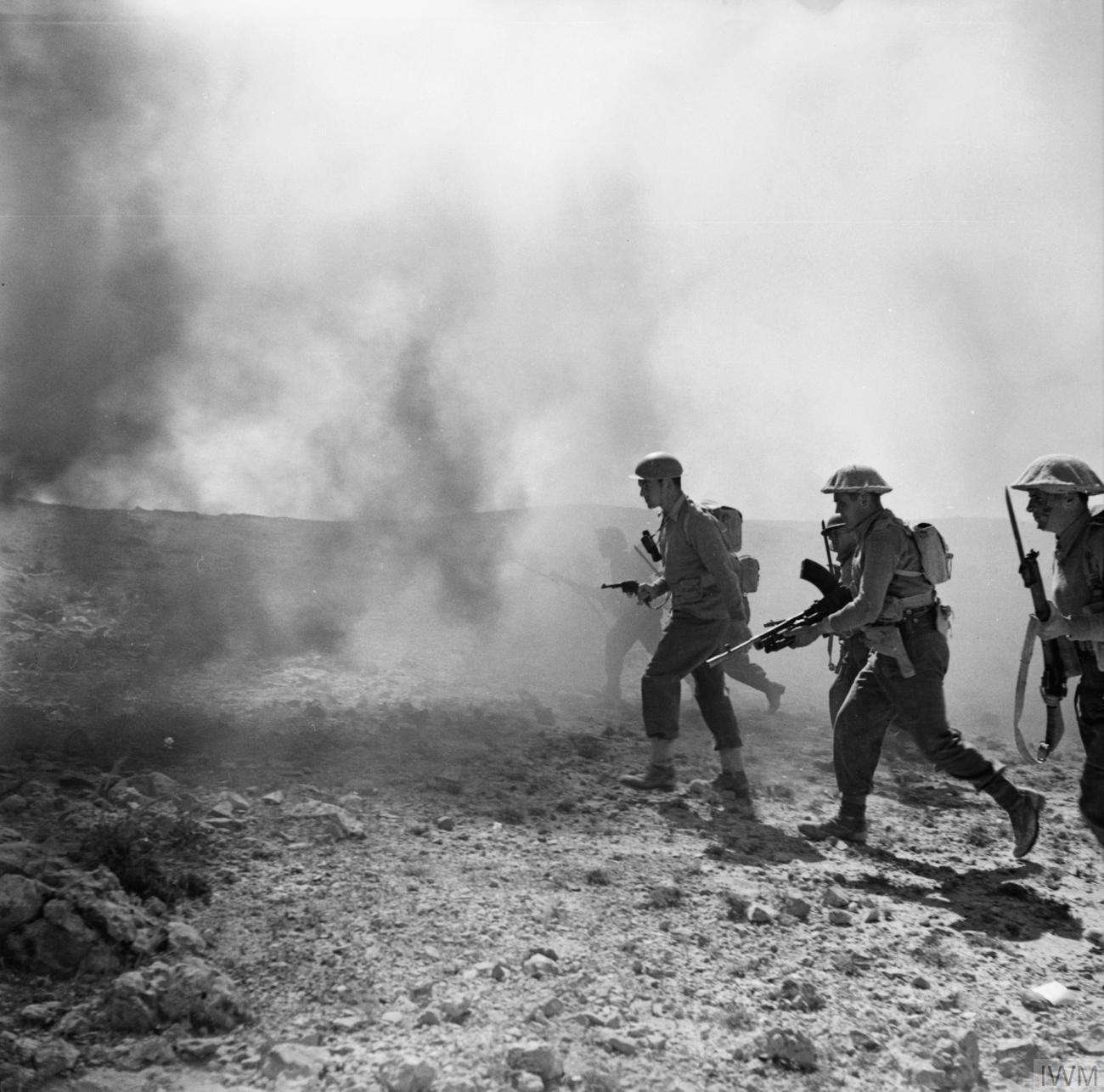
Men of the 7th Battalion, Green Howards, stage a re-enactment of the storming of Point 85 during the Gabes Gap battles, 11 April 1943.

For the next several days the division was employed in tidying the battle-field and burying the dead. On 2 April the division was told to supply a brigade for the coming battle at the next line at Wadi Akarit, which runs from the sea to impassable salt marshes of the Chott el Fejej, while the Germans were distracted by the advance of Lieutenant General George S. Patton's U.S. II Corps to the west. The 69th Brigade was sent forward with the division machine gunners and a squadron of tanks from the 3rd County of London Yeomanry (Sharpshooters), but they were not to be supported by the divisional artillery as all available transport was being used to move Eighth Army supplies. Fire support was to come from the 51st (Highland) Division's artillery, the infantry of which were to attack on their right, while the 4th Indian Division attacked on their left. In the early morning of 6 April, the attack achieved its early objectives but then came under heavy fire which killed Lieutenant Colonel Seagrim, who had won the V.C. only recently. The 5th East Yorkshires' leading company suffered over 70% casualties, and during this attack Private Eric Anderson won a posthumous V.C., killed while attending to the wounded on the battlefield. The 6th Green Howards now passed through the first wave and also took casualties

He was no sooner on his feet than a single shot rang out and Coughlan...dropped dead in an instant. ... then my rage was up ... Angrily, I grabbed poor Coughlan's machine gun ... When we were about ten yards away we had reached the top of the slit trench and we killed any of the survivors, five of them cowering in the bottom of the trench. It was no time for pussy footing: we were consumed with rage and had to kill them to pay for our fallen pal. We were so intoxicated, we could not hold back, given the chance they would have killed us.

— Pte Bill Cheall 6th Green Howards

By 11:00 the battle was over, the tanks of the Yeomanry having got past the anti-tank ditch, and four hours later the 8th Armoured Brigade pushed on past the Wadi. The brigade had overrun parts of the Italian La Spezia Division.

The Eighth Army's attack north along the eastern coast of Tunisia, and the First Army's advance from the west, led eventually to the surrender of Axis forces in North Africa, on 13 May 1943, with almost 250,000 men taken prisoner, a number equal to that at Stalingrad on the Eastern Front earlier in the year. On 19 April, the division, now commanded by Major-General Sidney Kirkman (formerly the Commander, Royal Artillery (CRA) of the Eighth Army) after Nichols was sacked by Eighth Army commander Bernard Montgomery, was relieved by the 56th (London) Infantry Division and withdrawn from the front line, and on 24 April the 50th Division was ordered back to Alexandria by road. The division arrived on 11 May with all of the vehicles it had started out with some 2,000 miles previously, even though some had to be towed.

== Sicily ==
Map of the Allied landings in Sicily on 10 July 1943.

The 50th Division was joined in the Nile Delta by the 168th (London) Infantry Brigade (1st London Irish Rifles, 1st London Scottish, 10th Royal Berkshire Regiment), which had been detached from its parent formation, the 56th Division, but was completely inexperienced. There, on the Great Bitter Lake and on the Gulf of Aqaba they trained in amphibious landing techniques for the Allied invasion of Sicily (codenamed Operation Husky).

The invasion, planned for 10 July, would land the United States Seventh Army to operate on the Western sector, and the British Eighth Army to operate in the Eastern sector, and had as its objectives the port of Syracuse and the airfields inland. An airborne operation was to attempt to capture the bridges and waterways behind Syracuse. The division was to land on a one brigade front (151st Brigade) south of Cap Murro Di Porco with the 5th Division to their right (north). High winds scattered both seaborne and airborne landings, (Note: B Company of 6th D.L.I. landed one and a half hours late and 3000 yards from the target beach, they occupied Avola railway station and met up with a company from the 1st Battalion, K.O.Y.L.I. (from the 15th Brigade of the 5th Division) who were six miles from where they should have been and some American paratroopers who were 12 miles adrift.) but were able to concentrate and advance. The landing of the 69th Brigade later in the day was also disrupted, 168th Brigade was scheduled to land on D+3. Over the next few days the division lost most of its motor transport, bombed by the Luftwaffe while still on board ship. Forced to march, the division was allocated the minor inland road north and urged forward by the GOC, Major-General Kirkman, fought the German Battlegroup Schmalz and the Italian Napoli Division. On 13 July contact was established with the 51st (Highland) Division at Palazzolo.

=== Primosole bridge ===
Operation Fustian was intended to swiftly capture the bridges along the coast of the Catanian plain by coup de main using No. 3 Commando and the 1st Parachute Brigade of the 1st Airborne Division, they would then be relieved by troops of the 50th Division. On the night of 13–14 July the British Commandos seized the bridge of Ponti di Malati North of Lentini, and the British paratroopers dropped around Primisole bridge, a key bridge on the Sicilian coast south of Catania. High winds and lack of landing craft frustrated swift troop concentration in both cases, with only 30 out of 125 planes dropping on the Drop Zone at Primosole. Early on 14 July, the 69th Brigade fought the Germans and Italians around Lentini, allowing the 151st Brigade, supported by tanks of the 44th Royal Tank Regiment, to make a 25-mile forced march to the bridge. The few paratroopers on the bridge were forced off it by lack of ammunition and newly dispatched German paratroopers of the 3rd Parachute Regiment, part of the 1st Parachute Division, only two hours before 9th Battalion D.L.I. arrived. Attacking in the early hours of 15 July, the battalion was forced back over the river after fierce hand-to-hand fighting in densely planted vineyards, with the supporting tanks being engaged by 88mm guns. An attack by the 8th Battalion D.L.I. was delayed, allowing them to learn of a ford upstream of the bridge from one of the paratroopers. Before dawn on 16 July two companies of the battalion achieved surprise and established themselves across the Catania road some 200 yards north of the bridge, but in doing so lost all their means to summon the rest of the battalion. Communication was restored only when a War Office observer riding a bicycle crossed the bridge to 'observe' the battle and was dispatched back by the C.O. to bring the rest of the battalion forward. The arrival of the remaining two companies started a fierce battle in the vineyard, and during the day the battalion fought off a number of counter-attacks, but was slowly pushed back. Early on 17 July, supported by division and XIII Corps artillery, the 6th and 9th D.L.I. crossed the river in the face of machine gun fire and gradually established themselves on the northern shore of the river. By dawn the bridgehead was firmly established and the arrival across the bridge of Sherman tanks from the 3rd County of London Yeomanry on the Northern Shore brought about the German surrender. The battle had cost the 151st Brigade over 500 killed, wounded and missing, but around 300 Germans were dead and 155 had been made prisoner.

=== The end in Sicily ===
While the 69th Brigade mopped up around Lentini, the 151st Brigade rested south of the bridge, and the inexperienced 168th Brigade was sent into its first battle at Catania airfield on the night of 17—18 July. They faced veteran German paratroopers of the 4th Parachute Regiment and Gruppe Schmalz dug-in in woods and an anti-tank ditch. Almost everything went wrong, reconnaissance was faulty, surprise was lost, the advance was caught by enfilade fire and some units were caught by their own artillery fire. The brigade was forced to withdraw. Directed by enemy observers in these positions, long range artillery destroyed the Primisole bridge but left two bailey bridges intact. The 50th Division remained in these positions for the next two weeks.

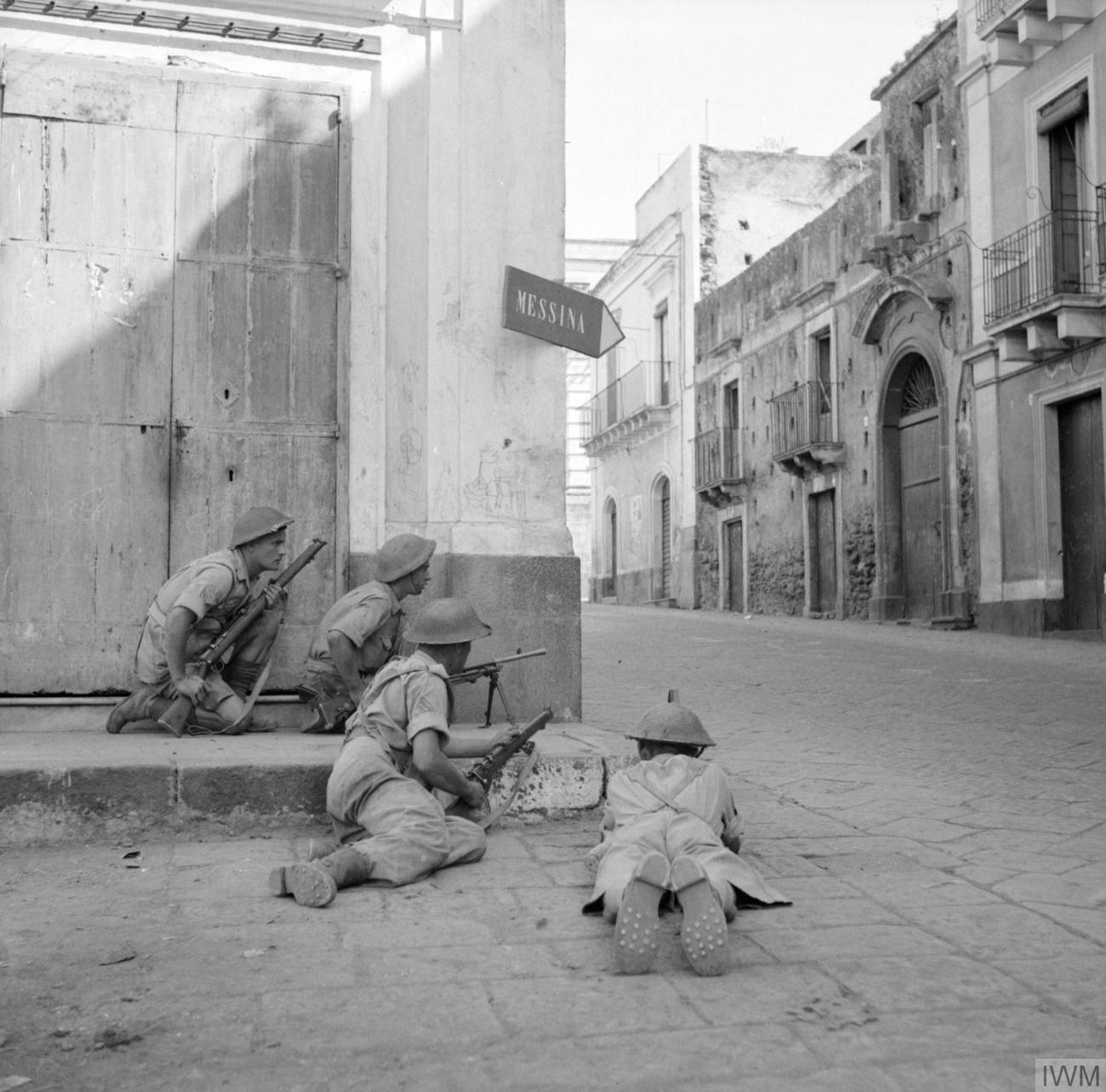
Men of the 9th Battalion, Durham Light Infantry take cover on a street corner in Acireale, Sicily, 8 August 1943.

On 4 August the Germans blew up ammunition dumps on Catania airfield and withdrew, and on 5 August the 6th and 9th D.L.I. entered Catania. The remainder of the advance was through territory ideal for ambush, with terraced vineyards and high stone walls resulting in many casualties. With the end of fighting on 17 August, the division was rested and absorbed reinforcements. On 10 October the 168th Brigade returned to the 56th Division, then involved in the early stages of the Italian Campaign, and was permanently replaced by the 231st Brigade, which also fought in Sicily. The 50th Division learned it was to return to Britain, as it was chosen by Montgomery, the Eighth Army commander, along with the 7th Armoured and the 51st (Highland) Infantry Divisions, to be among the veteran divisions to take part in the campaign in North-West Europe.

During the campaign in Sicily, the 50th Division had lost 426 killed, 1,132 wounded and 545 missing; it had taken almost 9,000 prisoners, mostly Italian, and had earned 68 bravery awards.

=== Salerno mutiny ===
On 16 September 1943 some 600 men from the 50th and 51st Divisions, convalescents from the North African Campaign, took part in the Salerno mutiny when they were assigned to be replacements for other British divisions taking part in the Allied invasion of Italy. Part of a group of about 1,500 men, mostly new reinforcements which had sailed from Tripoli, the veterans understood that they were to rejoin their units in Sicily. Once aboard ship, they were told that they were being taken to Salerno, there to join the British 46th Infantry Division. Many of the soldiers felt they had been deliberately misled and refusing postings to unfamiliar units. They were addressed by the X Corps GOC, Lieutenant-General Richard McCreery, who admitted that a mistake had been made and promised that they would rejoin their old units once Salerno was secure. The men were also warned of the consequences of mutiny in wartime. Of the three hundred men left, 108 decided to follow orders, leaving a hard core of 192. They were all charged with mutiny under the Army Act, the largest number of men accused at any one time in all of British military history. The accused were shipped to Algeria, where the courts-martial opened towards the end of October. All were found guilty and three sergeants were sentenced to death. The sentences were subsequently suspended, though the men faced constant harassment for the rest of their military careers.

The division left Sicily in mid October.

== North-West Europe ==
=== Training and Reinforcement ===
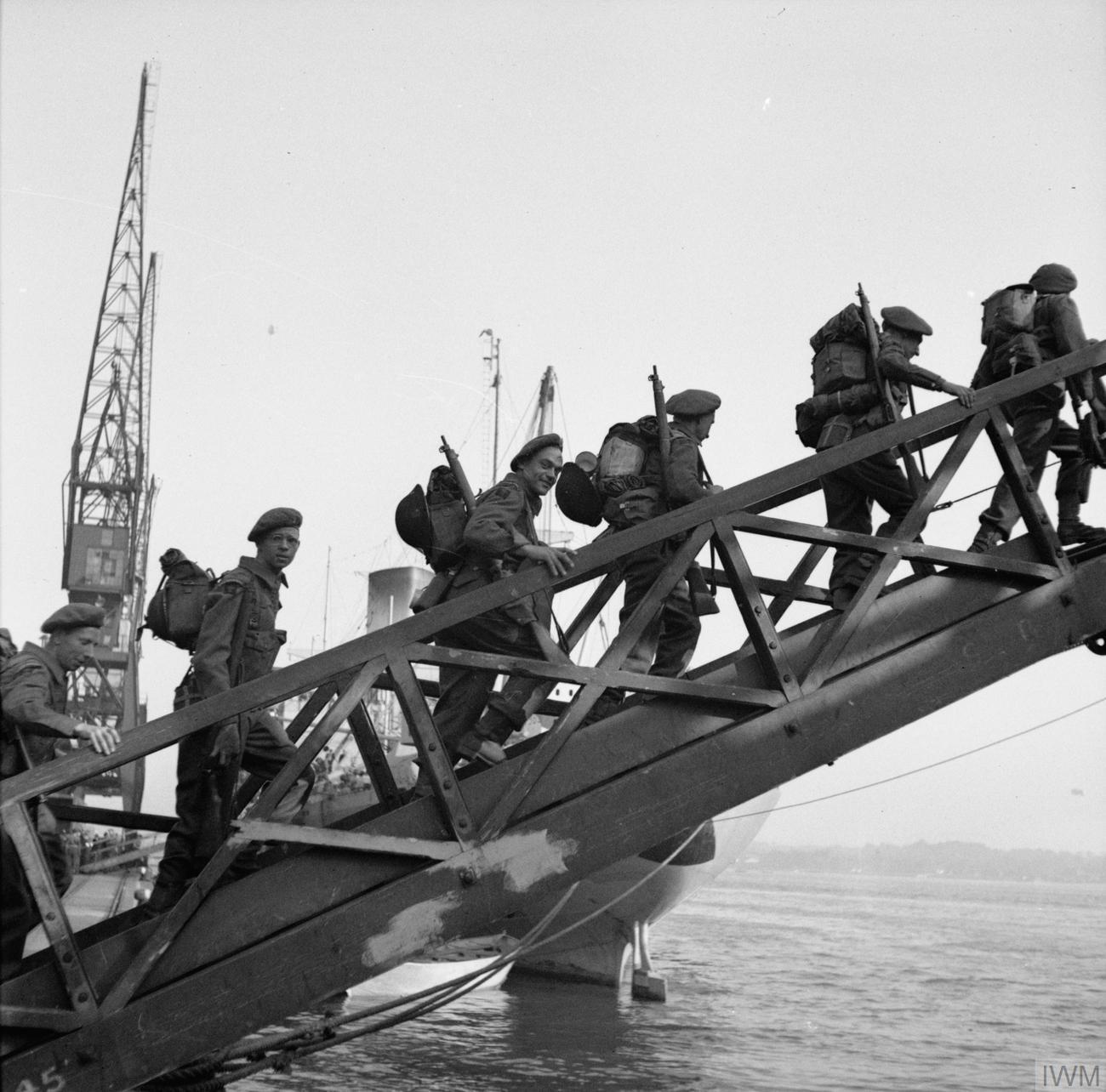
Troops from the 6th or 7th Battalion, Green Howards embarking onto the LSI 'SS Empire Lance' at Southampton, 29 May 1944.

The 50th Division arrived back in Britain at Liverpool Docks in early November 1943:

On the way home we was told to remove all our insignia as no one was to know we was coming, the first thing we saw when we entered Liverpool Docks was a big banner proclaiming 'Welcome Home 50th Division'.

— Sgt Max Hearst 5th East Yorkshire Regiment

After two weeks leave the division began to train for the invasion, and the news that it was to be an assault division was not greeted well by the other ranks. On 19 January 1944 the GOC, Major-General Kirkman, had been promoted to command XIII Corps on the Italian Front and was replaced by Major-General Douglas Graham, a highly experienced and competent soldier who had commanded a brigade in North Africa and a division in Italy before returning to England after receiving an injury. The 50th Division was now part of XXX Corps, part of Lieutenant-General Sir Miles Dempsey's British Second Army. For its tasks on D-Day the division was considerably reinforced with an additional infantry brigade (the 56th), an armoured Brigade (the 8th), a Royal Marine Commando (the 47th), two artillery regiments (and batteries from four others) and additional engineers and other supporting arms, including two beach groups (the 9th and 10th) to organise the landing area (and a third, the 36th, in reserve); this brought the total strength of the division to around 38,000 men. The 69th and 231st Brigades were chosen for the assault and were given specialist training with the specialist armour around Inveraray and later, on the south coast. The 50th Division was loaded aboard its ships by the evening of 3 June and had to wait out the 24-hour postponement afloat. The division's GOC, Major-General Douglas Graham, sent a message around this time:

'The time is at hand to strike − to break the Western Wall and into the Continent of Europe. To you, officers and men of the 50th (Northumbrian) Division, has been given the great honour of being in the vanguard of this mighty blow for freedom.'

— Maj-Gen Douglas Graham, GOC 50th (Northumbrian) Infantry Division

=== D-Day ===
==== Objectives ====
The assault brigades were to land on the eastern edge of Gold, the codename for the area between the fortified villages of Le Hammel and La Rivière. Follow on brigades were to widen and deepen the bridgehead to the south and south-west, securing Arromanches, the future site of the British Mulberry harbour, capturing Bayeux and securing the Caen-Bayeux road (Route National 13). The Commandos were to capture Port-en-Bessin from the rear. By the end of the day the bridgehead was planned to be 10–12 miles wide and seven miles deep in places, with a link up with the U.S. 1st Infantry Division landing at Omaha to the west and the 3rd Canadian Division landing to the east on Juno. Facing them were the German 716th Static Infantry Division, and elements of the 1st Battalion of the German 352nd Infantry Division.

==== The Plan ====
H-Hour for 50th Division's landing was 0725 hours, supporting the assaulting troops were the DD tanks of the 4th/7th Royal Dragoon Guards (for the 69th Brigade) and the Sherwood Rangers Yeomanry (for the 231st Brigade), these were to land at H-5 minutes. At H hour the first of the specialist armour and sappers from the Beach Groups were to land (9th Beach Group for 69th Brigade, 10th Beach Group for the 231st) and begin clearing obstacles and reducing strong points. The infantry would begin to land at H+7, two companies from each battalion, from east to west; 69th Brigade with 5th East Yorkshires on King red beach and 6th Green Howards on King green beach, 231st Brigade with 1st Dorsets on Jig red, 1st Hampshires on Jig green beaches, reinforced at H+20 with the remainder of the battalion. Additional Beach Group troops were to land at H+25 and H+30, and self propelled artillery at H+60 (86th (Hertfordshire Yeomanry) Field Regiment for the 69th Brigade and 147th (Essex Yeomanry) Field Regiment for the 231st Brigade), these guns were to fire from the landing craft in support of the landing. The follow on brigades would begin landing at H+2 1/2 hours.

==== The Assault ====
The 50th Division took off from Southampton and on 6 June 1944, 7:25, made landfall on Gold Beach, alongside the 8th Armoured Brigade, No. 47 (Royal Marine) Commando, 56th Infantry Brigade.

Universal Carrier of 50th Division wades ashore D-Day 6 June 1944.

The landing craft were deployed 7 miles (11 km) from the beach, a shorter run than the Americans (12 miles (19 km)), still due to the weather many of the troops were sea-sick. Rather than risk the DD-tanks with their limited free-board in the rough seas, they were landed directly onto the beaches with or slightly behind the assault infantry. Prior to this the beach group engineers had landed (280th Company for the 69th Brigade and 73rd Company for the 231st, both with supporting armour) and had begun to reduce the beach obstacles and defences. The assault battalions of the 69th brigade landed either side of La Rivière, the East Yorkshires blown to the east of their intended landing, attacking La Rivière from the rear by 10:00. To the west the Green Howards were initially caught in enfilade fire from La Rivière, but by 10:00 were 1 mile (1.6 km) inland on the Meuvaines ridge. During this advance Company Sergeant-Major Stanley Hollis of the 6th Green Howards was in the first of the actions that were to win him the VC, the only one to be won on D-Day. The 7th Green Howards, landing at H+45 minutes, captured the bridge at Creuilly by 15:00.

To the west the assault battalions of the 231st brigade landed east of Le Hammel, the Hampshires close to Le Hammel, the Dorsets further east. The pre-landing bombardment had missed the strong points in the village which were staffed by the tougher German 352nd Division. This caused heavy casualties among the Hampshires, who like the Green Howards, were caught in enfilade, while the Dorsets were off the beach in an hour, it was not until 15:00 that the last strong point in Le Hammel was reduced by an AVRE.

47 Commando were landed at 10:00, while the Hampshires were still fighting for Le Hammel, three of their landing craft were sunk by obstacles obscured by the rising tide. They conducted a fighting advance inland but did not take Port-en-Bessin until the early morning of 8 June. At 11:00 the 151st brigade began to land, following the 69th brigade, the 56th brigade landed at east of its intended beach to avoid the fire from the strong point at Le Hammel. By nightfall the division held a beach head 6 miles (9.7 km) deep by 6 miles (9.7 km) wide, contact had been made with the Canadians, and patrols from the 56th Brigade had entered Bayeux, but the division was short of the Bayeux—Caen road.

During D-Day, in addition to Stanley Hollis' V.C., the men of the division won 32 Military Medals, three Distinguished Conduct Medals, 15 Military Crosses and five Distinguished Service Orders (one a bar). The division suffered 400 casualties while securing their beachhead, 174 of them from the 1st Hampshires. By midnight on 6 June, 24,970 men had landed at Gold.

=== Normandy ===
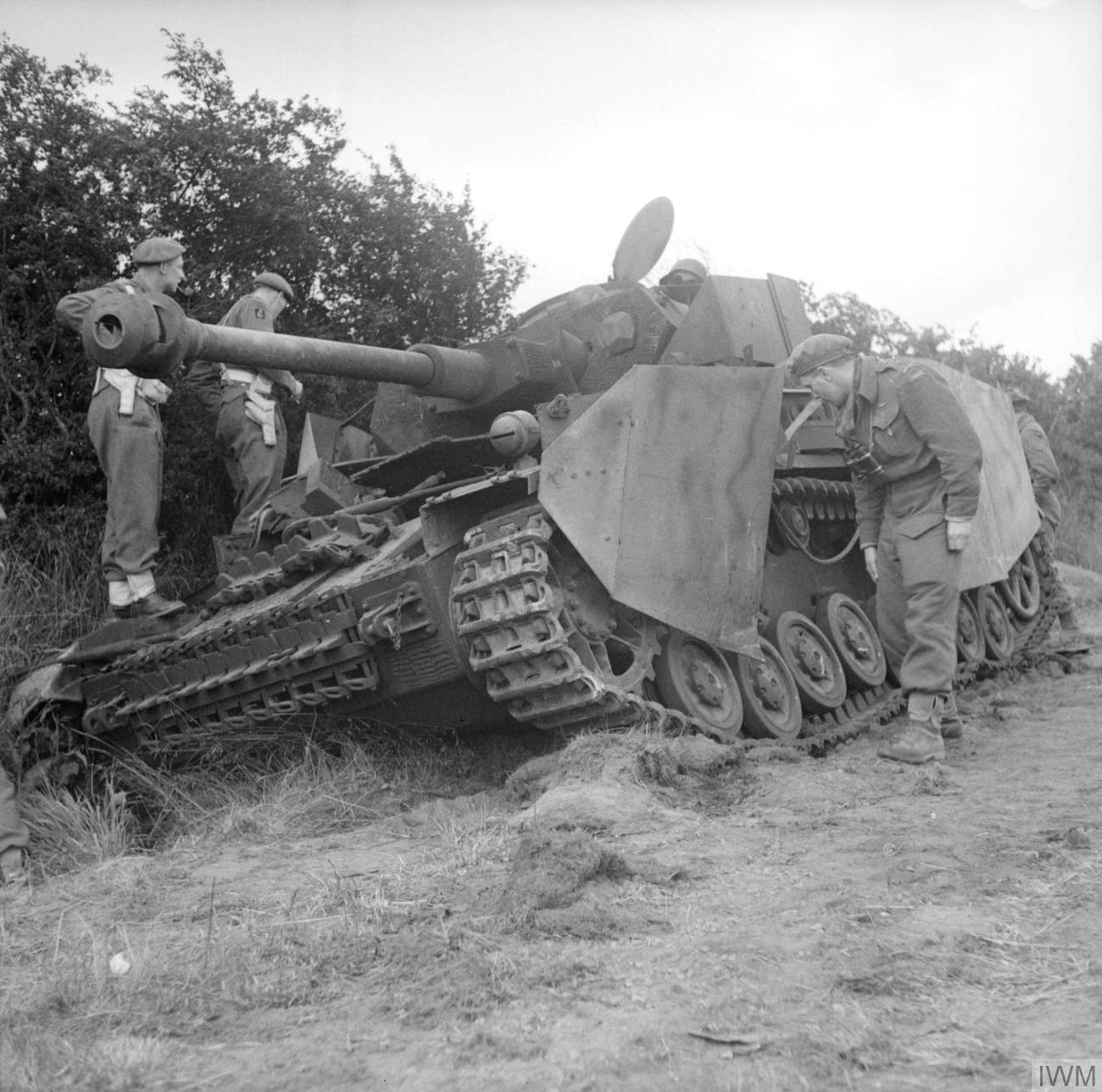
Officers inspect a German Mk IV tank knocked out by men of the Durham Light Infantry, 11 June 1944.

Operation Perch began on 7 June and was the attempt to capture Caen after the direct attack on D-day failed. The plan called for the 7th Armoured Division, supported by the 50th Division to strike south to capture Tilly-sur-Seulles, following which the 7th Armoured Division would capture Villers-Bocage and Evrecy. On 7 June, the 50th Division occupied Bayeux and advanced 3 miles (4.8 km) south. On 8 June a column from the division started south over the Caen–Bayeux railway into the Bocage. (Note: 8th Armoured Brigade, 1st Dorsets (motorised), 147th (S.P.) Field Rgt, 61st Reconnaissance Rgt, machine gunners and engineers.) Advancing 6,000 yards (5,500 m) to the bridges between Tilly and Saint-Pierre (~1 mile (1.6 km) to the east), they were joined by the 8th D.L.I. but had placed themselves in a salient facing the Panzer Lehr Division and the SS Hitlerjugend Division. Saint-Pierre was captured after close-quarters fighting by 8 D.L.I. and 24th Lancers on 9 June. Counter-attacked on 10 June, they were for a time surrounded. This counter-attack blunted the advance to Villers-Bocage that day and the 69th Brigade attack on Cristot. The 8th D.L.I was finally withdrawn on 12 June after losing 212 officers and men in the struggle. During this time the remainder of the division had fought forward to hold a line (either side of the 7th Armoured Division) between La Belle Epine and Point 103 (~1 mile (1.6 km)) to the north-east of Saint Pierre.

Along the beaches and on their fringes was strewn the wreckage of the German defences and our landing craft and tanks, rusting memorials to the first encounters of the Normandy campaign. On the roads between the beaches and the British front lines, there crawled and stopped and started again, endless streams of lorries, tanks, armoured cars and jeeps. The sea was rough, the sun shone. The little roads disintegrated into dust. Every journey a nightmare of traffic jams, dust, heat and engine fumes.

— Capt. E Clay GSO3 50th Division

On 12 June, the 7th Armoured Division was side-stepped to the west to head south and take Villers-Bocage from the west, getting behind the Panzer Lehr Division facing 50th Division. This resulted in the Battle of Villers-Bocage, and the withdrawal of 7th Armoured from the area on 15 June. The 50th Division attacked on the flank of Tilly-sur-Seulles, up to and along the Tilly–Balleroy road, with 151st Brigade taking Verrières and half of the town of Lingèvres and the 231st Brigade taking La Senaudière.

We are going in to assault. The [6th] Durhams go in like mad with the fixed bayonets into farm buildings. There are two 75s, three SP guns, a half track and seven Spandau positions dug into a sunken lane. Casualties are so heavy after the battle that two composite companies have to be formed from the whole battalion. But what magnificent troops these Durhams are. It was sheer guts that got them into Verrières.

— Capt Stephan Perry, FOO 86th Field Rgt R.A.

After its hard fighting around Cristot, the 69th Brigade had been relieved by the 49th Division and was rested for two days.

==== Stalemate ====
The area of the division's Normandy battles.

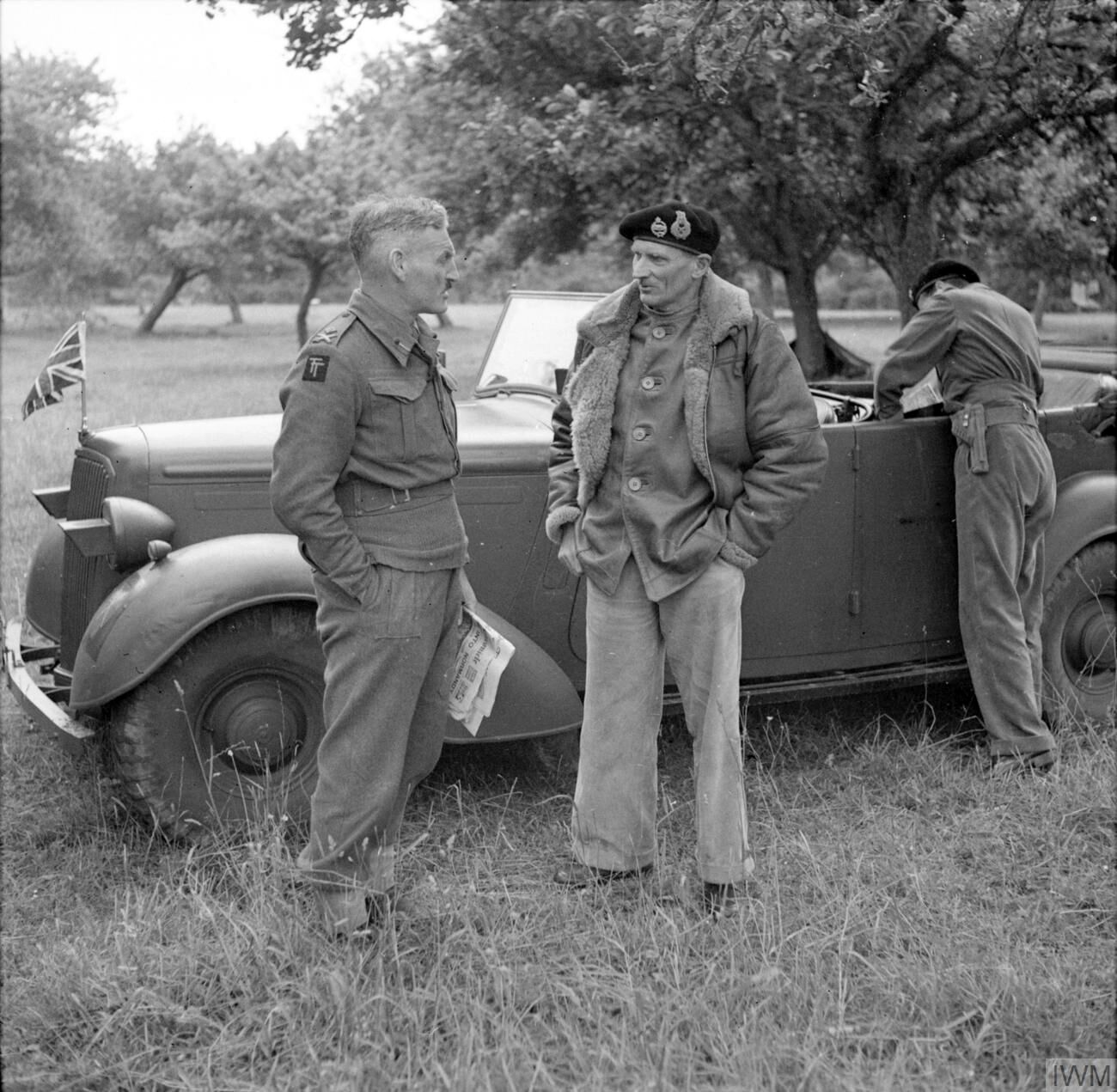
General Sir Bernard Montgomery in conversation with Major General Douglas Graham, GOC 50th (Northumbrian) Infantry Division, pictured here in Normandy, 20 June 1944.

By 19 June, the division, and the equally exhausted Panzer Lehr settled into a lull. On 16 June the 69th had advanced against stiff resistance to Longraye, about halfway to its goal of a road to the south and on 18 June the division had finally taken Tilly with the 2nd Essex (56th Brigade). (Note: The brigade had left the division on 15 June and was now an independent brigade under orders of XXX Corps.) Along with the 6th D.L.I. and tanks of the 24th Lancers, the 2nd Essex was preceded by a rolling barrage, described as "The perfect cooperation of artillery, tanks and infantry really showed what could be done". On 19 June two attempts to take Hottot (1 mile (1.6 km) south of Tilly) by the 231st Brigade (1st Hampshires then the 2nd Devons) failed, both time being forced out of the ruined village by armour.
The division was now arranged with 231st Brigade north of Hottot, 151st Brigade around Tilly and 69th Brigade south of La Belle Epine. This stalemate still included patrolling, sniping and harnessing mortar fire from both sides. An additional source of discomfort was the large number of dead cattle in the area and the resulting stench, any attempt to deal with this attracting German fire. The division was thus on the sidelines for Operation Epsom at the end of June.

The next advance was an attack was by 231st brigade against Hottot once again on 11 July, after 56th Brigade had been repulsed three days earlier. The Devons and the Hampshires both reached Hottot with the help of a rolling barrage, AVREs, flail tanks and the mortars and machine guns of the Cheshires, but were counter-attacked by Panzer IVs and Panthers and accidentally rocketed by Typhoons. They were forced to retire at night fall. The Hampshires alone had 120 casualties, including 43 dead. On 18 July, Panzer Lehr abandoned Hottot, since D-Day the division had suffered 4,476 casualties, of which 673 were dead.

==== Advance to the Falaise Pocket ====
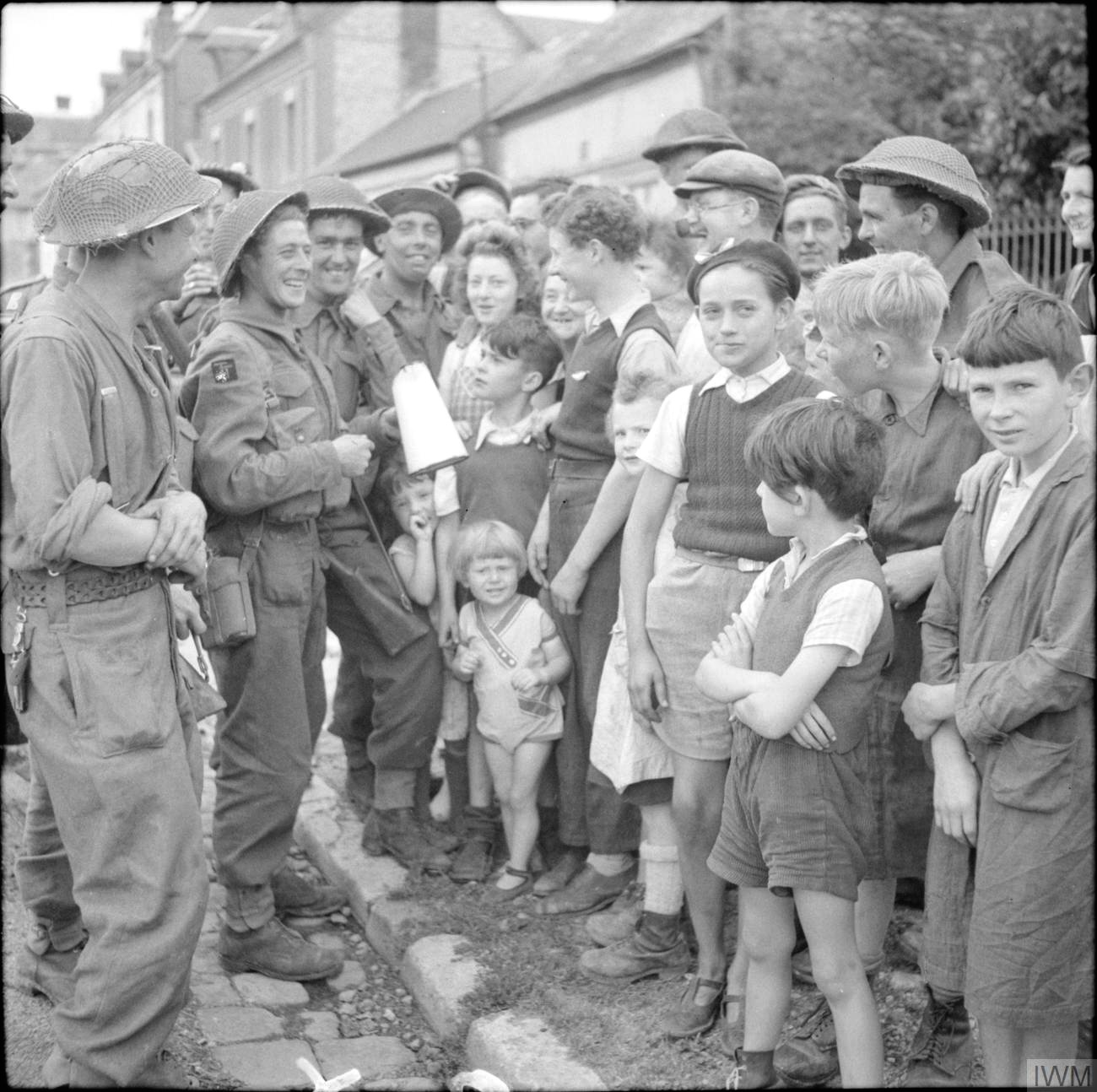
Members of the Green Howards (of either the 6th or 7th Battalions) talking to French civilians, 23 August 1944.

Timed to support the American break out to the west (Operation Cobra), VIII Corps and XXX Corps were to attack south. 50th Division was to advance towards Villers-Bocage with the 43rd Division on its right and the 59th Division on its left. On 30 July the 231st and 56th Brigades took a ridge of high ground (Anctoville) approximately halfway to Villers-Bocage against slackening opposition. On 2 August 69th Brigade advanced, facing small arms fire only, to Tracy-Bocage just west of Villers-Bocage, capturing a regimental commander and his HQ of the 326th Division, two days later a patrol from the Hampshires entered the ruined and booby-trapped village and saw the wreckage of the armoured clash that had taken place there nearly two months earlier. On 5 August the division was taken out of the line for the first time since D-Day and given three days rest.

Returning from its rest after the Germans had launched Operation Lüttich, the division was tasked with the advance to Condé-sur-Noireau some 13 miles (21 km) from its starting point (Le Plessis-Grimout, captured by the 43rd Division on the night of 7 August) thus preventing the Germans from putting their full strength against the Americans. On 9 August the 151st and 69th Brigade attacked in turn supported by tanks of the 13th/18th Hussars against stiffening resistance to end the day short of Saint-Pierre-la-Vieille. Over the next two days the 231st Brigade gained ground to the west and south of Saint-Pierre, and after taking hill to the south-east of the village the 151st Brigade was rested for several days. On the night of 12/13 August 7th Green Howards entered Saint-Pierre, this broke the German resistance in this area and Condé was entered the next day, and the reduction of the Falaise Pocket began. The commander of XXX Corps, Brian Horrocks praised the division in a letter to its GOC

I cannot give you higher praise than by saying that the most experienced battle fighting Division in the British Army has once more lived up to its high reputation.

The 50th Division was considered to have performed very well during the Normandy campaign, not suffering the initial problems of the two other veteran divisions. (Note: The new commander of the 7th Armoured in Normandy said, Two of the three divisions that came back from Italy at the end of 1943, the 7th Armoured and 51st Highland, were extremely 'swollen headed'. They were a law unto themselves: they thought they need only obey those orders that suited them. Before the battles of Caumont I had been warned to look out for transport of the 7th Armoured on the road – their march discipline was non-existent. Both...deserved the criticism they received... — Maj-Gen Gerald Lloyd-Verney 7th Armoured Division.) This may have been due to the higher turnover of personnel before D-Day; however, the division still suffered the same problems of battle fatigue, desertion and soldiers going AWL as the other veteran divisions, but it did not affect the division's battle readiness. It was noted that in Normandy,

...that many veterans are running out of courage. Most men have a finite amount of this commodity and it can get used up. The Germans had no such problem. All deserters are shot. Thus everybody stayed in the firing line. The average infantryman has fought in six major attacks without being hit, he knows that he won't last another six. ... Not nice to think that the best that can happen is to be wounded – get a 'Blighty'.

— Lt G Picot, 1st Hampshires.

=== Breakout ===
The division passed through the wreckage of the Falaise Pocket and by 22 August had passed Argenten. It now took up position on the left flank of XXX Corps advance, behind 11th Armoured Division, mopping up bypassed Germans. On one occasion near Beauvais a major, lance corporal and a private of the 2nd Cheshires with three members of the FFI took 500 Germans prisoner. Other small actions were fought at Picquigny and Oudenarde. On 29 August it crossed the Seine behind the 43rd Division, and on 2 September 231st Brigade entered Brussels behind the Guards Armoured Division; the brigade took part in the ceremonial liberation parades. After the capture of Antwerp 231st Brigade garrisoned that city, while 151st Brigade garrisoned Brussels.

=== The Low Countries ===
==== Geel ====
On 7 September the division was reassembled to continue XXX Corps drive toward the Dutch border. The Corps was to force a crossing across the Albert Canal, and the division was tasked to attack towards Geel, which lay in an angle between the Albert and the Bocholt–Herentals Canals, while the Guards Armoured crossed at Beringen to the south east. In the early morning of 8 September, 6 Green Howards crossed the canal unopposed using a small number of Goatley boats as a ferry, taking over three hours to do so. With the rest of 69th Brigade, they captured the Geel road crossing of the canal and its blown bridge by the end of 10 September. On the evening of 8 September, 151st Brigade crossed the canal to the south east, the 8th D.L.I. taking casualties until supported by the heavier weapons of the 2nd Cheshires and beating off a counter-attack that night. The next day, supported by the division's reconnaissance regiment, the 6th D.L.I. pushed forward towards Geel. The next day (10 September) with the arrival of 9th D.L.I. and tanks of the Sherwood Rangers, the brigade advanced on Geel in the face of resistance which began when the Germans attacked as the 6th D.L.I. was starting off. In spite of this the 6th D.L.I. reached Geel, expelling the Germans house by house while the other two battalions fought off additional German attacks between Geel and the canal. Another counter-attack that evening cut off some units of the 6th D.L.I. and forced the rest back to the southern parts of Geel and hard pressed the other battalions on the flanks throughout the next day. The brigade learned that its opponents included parachute troops and Luftwaffe Field Battalions containing some poorly trained but fanatical young troops. On 12 September the order for the 50th to withdraw from the Geel bridgehead was made. Later that day the two brigades were relieved by the 15th Division, who on 13 September entered Geel unopposed, the Germans having fled.

==== Operation Market Garden ====
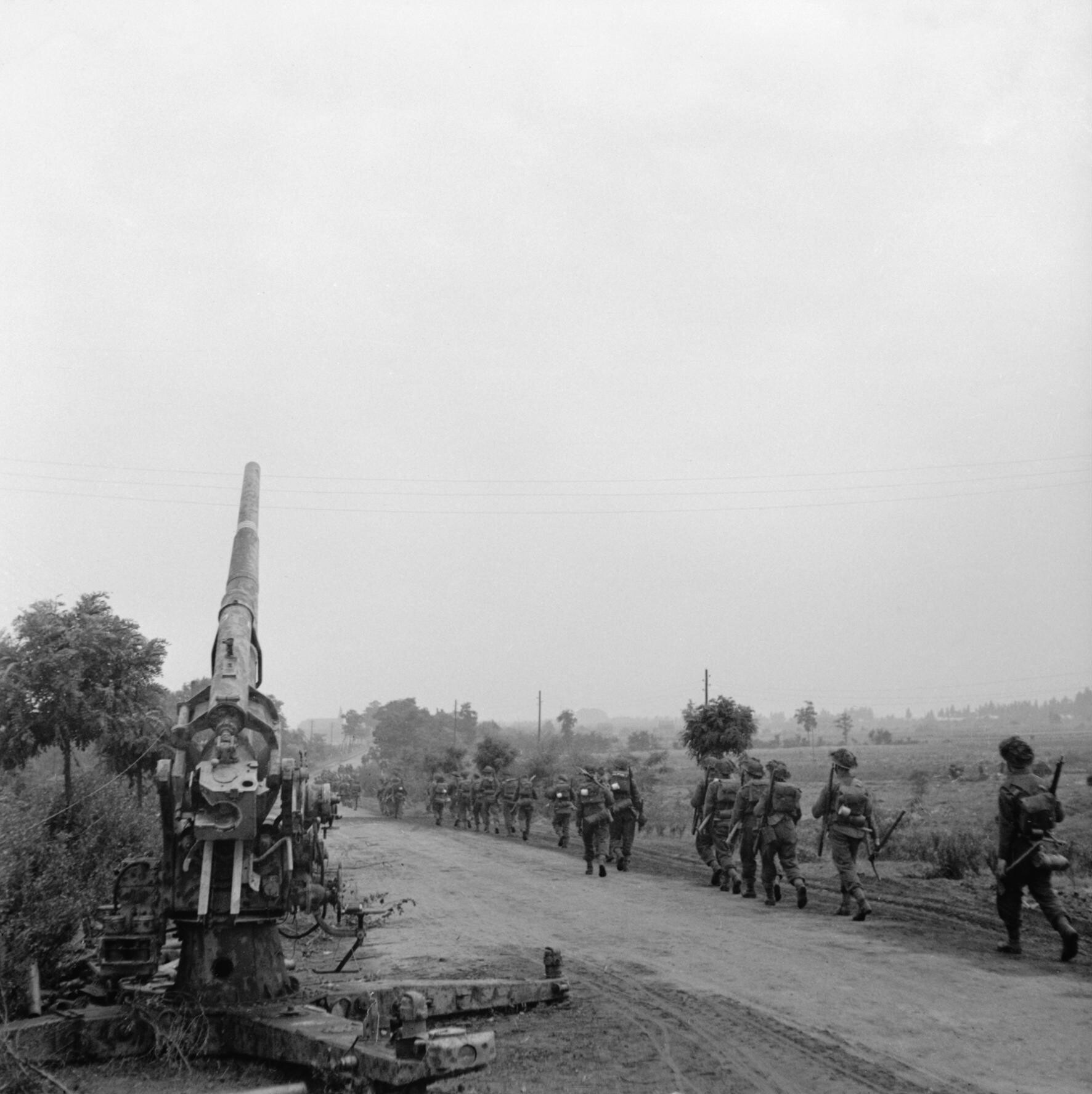
Infantry of 50th (Northumbrian) Division moving up past a knocked-out German 88mm gun near 'Joe's Bridge' over the Meuse-Escaut Canal in Belgium, 16 September 1944.

After three days reorganisation in the Pael area the division was deployed in the bridgehead over the Escaut (Bocholt-Herentals) canal, part of the ground component of Market Garden. They were to follow the Guards Armoured and the 43rd Divisions in the advance as Corps reserve. At 13:30 on 17 September, the division's field artillery and the mortars of the 2nd Cheshires took part in the opening barrage. The ground advance began at 14:30, and later in the day as the Guards reached Valkenswaard, the 231st Brigade were called up to clear woods on the left of the Guards' advance, hunting 'bazooka' teams. The following day the 2nd Devons took over Valkenswaard, the Battalion C.O. becoming town governor, and 9th D.L.I. repelled a counter-attack on the Escaut bridgehead.

Following the capture of Nijmegen the 69th Brigade, and 124th Field Regiment were pushed forwards and reached its area on the evening of 21 September. The next day the Germans began to attempt to cut the supply rout of the advance and attacked the road and with two battalions of infantry and a regiment of tanks near Uden, 8 miles (13 km) south of the bridge at Grave. This left the 5th East Yorkshires to the north of the cut and the remainder of the brigade to the south. The next day, the Germans attempted to strengthen their grip on the road by attacking Veghel, farther south. The American infantry, British tanks and artillery, working in an improvised but close co-operation, drove off the enemy with heavy losses. This allowed the brigade to rejoin and push on to Nijmegen, where they moved into the bridgehead over the Waal and come under command of the Guards Armoured Division.

We crossed the bridge and took over from the Yanks... When we approached the bridge there were a lot of dead American paras laid out. Here we met the German storm-troopers, you know the death or glory boys... We dug in both sides and held the position for a number of days. Frogmen came up the river to blow the bridge but they were spotted in time and shot on the water.
I was sat in a trench having a drink when a plane came over, I said "look the poor buggers on fire!" That was my first sight of a jet fighter.

— Sgt Max Hearst, 5th East Yorkshires

Due to the road congestion and the Germans attempts to cut the road, 69th Brigade were forced to eat captured German rations, the jam tasted like rubber, the margarine was rancid and the regimental medical officers confirmed the meat was bad.

The remainder of 50th Division were now tasked with keep the road open between Uden and Veghel. On 23 September the road was temporarily cut and one of the 9th D.L.I.s dispatch riders led the Corps commander across the gap along back roads. Reinforced with the 131st Brigade, the division together with the Americans fought for the next two days keeping the road open, and on 26 September the German attempts ended.
Meanwhile, 69th Brigade in Nijmegen was given the task of capturing Bemmel, a village north of the river. The 5th East Yorkshires achieved this after hard fighting on 24 and 25 September but suffered heavy artillery fire for days. The next day the 6th Green Howards were ordered to occupy Haalderen, but the infantry were overlooked by German observers and ran into severe opposition from concealed tanks, and failed to capture their objective. The 7th Green Howards on their left made further progress, and the fighting for Haalderen continued the next day.

==== The Nijmegen Salient ====
By this time (27 September) the airborne troops farther north at Arnhem had been withdrawn. The Germans regrouped and assaulted the new salient and on 30 September 69th Brigade supported by 13th/18th Hussars, (Note: Now under 43rd Division orders together with 5th Guards Armoured Brigade.) faced the first assault. The next day seventy tanks and the equivalent of an infantry division attacked the brigade, the intensity of their defence can be judged by the fact that 124th Field Regiment fired a total of 12,500 25-pound shells during the action and 'B' Company of 2nd Cheshires fired 95,000 rounds of medium machine-gun fire.

The brigade was relieved by the rest of the 50th Division which continued the attack around Haalderen (151st Brigade) and straightening the line between there and Bemmel (231st Brigade). The division was now tasked with guarding bridgehead north of Nijmegen called the Island, and for nearly two months static warfare was the norm, patrolling and mortaring. The forward troops rotated regularly with frequent leave to Brussels, Antwerp and Eindhoven, the D.L.I. regimental band brought from their depot at Brancepeth provided music for concerts and dances with the locals. The casualties in the battles on the island in early October had been severe: almost 900 including 12 officers and 111 other ranks killed in action, 30 officers and 611 other ranks wounded and another 114 missing, in total since D-Day 50th Division had suffered of 488 officers and 6,932 ORs casualties, but had also assimilated 358 officers and 8,019 ORs.

On 29 November the division was relieved and pulled back into Belgium.

== Return to England ==
Earlier in November, Montgomery had made a speech to the division's officers in a cinema in Bourg Leopold to the effect that the 50th Division would return to England as 50th Infantry (Reserve) Division, a training division. Veterans who had served three and a half years or more overseas would be repatriated to Britain under the Python scheme or given generous leave (LILOP, Leave in lieu of Python). Three other categories of men were drawn up, the more recent infantry reinforcements were to be posted to other rifle battalions, men who required retraining as infantry and others who could perform garrison duties.

Most of the infantry battalions were reduced to cadre strength of 12 officers and 109 men (the 9th D.L.I. and 2nd Devons were reinforced and joined 131st Infantry Brigade of the 7th Armoured Division in exchange for the 1/6th and 1/7th Battalions Queen's Royal Regiment (West Surrey)). The 74th Field Regiment R.A was transferred to the 49th Division, the 90th to 21st Army Group control, the 102nd Anti-Tank Regiment transferred to the 15th Division. The remains of the division returned to Britain on 14 December to train new recruits and converted rear echelon personnel.

In August 1945 the division headquarters relinquished control of its units, was sent to Norway and converted into H.Q. British Land Forces Norway for the latter stages of Operation Doomsday.

== Post-war ==
The Territorial Army was reformed on 1 January 1947. Recruiting was slow, however the 151st Brigade (now composed of the 4th and 7th Royal Northumberland Fusiliers and the 8th D.L.I.), together with 6th D.L.I. and 17th (9th D.L.I.) Parachute Regiment were able to mount a summer camp that year (even so the 7th RNF could only muster 71 officers and men). In 1961 the division became a district headquarters as 50th (Northumbrian) Division/District, and by 1966 it was headquartered at Kirklevington Hall, Yarm, Yorkshire. The division's second-to-last commander, Major General Keith-Jones, wrote the foreword to a divisional history pamphlet from Kirklevington Hall in June 1966. The division was disbanded on the reduction of the TA into the Territorial and Army Volunteer Reserve on 1 April 1967, when many individual TA units lost their identities. The district headquarters itself formed the core of the structure for the creation of North East District under HQ United Kingdom Land Forces in 1972.

== General officers commanding ==
The division had the following commanders:

Appointed	General officer commanding
February 1935	Major-General William N. Herbert
February 1939	Major-General Giffard Le Q. Martel
December 1940	Major-General William H. Ramsden
July 1942	Major-General John S. Nichols
April 1943	Major-General Sidney C. Kirkman
January 1944	Major-General Douglas A.H. Graham
1945	Major-General Robert F.B. Naylor
August 1946	Major-General John B. Churcher
1 January 1947	Major-General John Y. Whitfield
January 1948	Major-General Charles F. Loewen
July 1950	Major-General Lashmer G. Whistler
March 1951	Major-General Horatius Murray
August 1953	Major-General Cyril H. Colquhoun
September 1956	Major-General William H. Hulton-Harrop
May 1959	Major-General Lord Thurlow
May 1962	Major-General Antony Read
March 1964	Major-General Richard Keith-Jones
July 1966	Major-General Derek Horsford

== Order of battle ==
50th (Northumbrian) Infantry Division (France, 1940)

25th Infantry Brigade (9-18 May, 19–21 May 1940, from BEF GHQ)

- 1/7th Battalion, Queen's Royal Regiment (West Surrey)
- 1st Battalion, Royal Irish Fusiliers
- 2nd Battalion, Essex Regiment
- Brigade Anti-Tank Company

150th Infantry Brigade

- 4th Battalion, East Yorkshire Regiment
- 4th Battalion, Green Howards
- 5th Battalion, Green Howards
- Brigade Anti-Tank Company

151st Infantry Brigade

- 6th Battalion, Durham Light Infantry
- 8th Battalion, Durham Light Infantry
- 9th Battalion, Durham Light Infantry
- Brigade Anti-Tank Company

Divisional Troops

- 50th Divisional artillery, Royal Artillery
  - 72nd (Northumbrian) Field Regiment
  - 74th (Northumbrian) Field Regiment
  - 92nd Field Regiment (from 9 May 1940, from 5th Division)
  - 65th (Norfolk & Suffolk) Anti-Tank Regiment
- 50th Divisional Engineers, Royal Engineers
  - 232nd (Northumbrian) Field Company
  - 505th Field Company
  - 235th (Northumbrian) Field Park Company
  - 242nd Field Company (from 19 May 1940, from BEF GHQ)
- 50th (Northumbrian) Divisional Signals, Royal Corps of Signals
- Royal Army Service Corps
  - 522nd (Ammunition), 523rd (Petrol) and 524th (Supply) Companies
  - 11th, 12th Motor Transport Companies
- Royal Army Medical Corps
  - 149th, 150th Field Ambulances
- 4th Battalion, Royal Northumberland Fusiliers

Frank Force (Arras, 1940)

Left Column

- 4th Royal Tank Regiment
- 6th Battalion, Durham Light Infantry
- 368th Battery, 92nd Field Regiment, Royal Artillery
- 206th Anti-Tank Battery, 52nd Anti-Tank Regiment, Royal Artillery
- Platoon from 151st Infantry Brigade Anti-Tank Company
- Motor cycle Company and Scout car Platoon from 4th Battalion, Royal Northumberland Fusiliers

Right Column

- 7th Royal Tank Regiment
- 8th Battalion, Durham Light Infantry
- 365th Battery, 92nd Field Regiment, Royal Artillery
- 260th Anti-Tank Battery, 65th Anti-Tank Regiment, Royal Artillery
- Platoon from 151st Infantry Brigade Anti-Tank Company
- Motor cycle Platoon from 4th Battalion, Royal Northumberland Fusiliers

Reserve (following the right column)

- 9th Battalion, Durham Light Infantry
- one battery Anti Tank guns
- Motor cycle Company from 4th Battalion, Royal Northumberland Fusiliers
- sapper detail

50th (Northumbrian) Infantry Division (North Africa, 1942–43)

69th Infantry Brigade (joined 1 July 1940)

- 5th Battalion, East Yorkshire Regiment
- 6th Battalion, Green Howards
- 7th Battalion, Green Howards

150th Infantry Brigade (captured at Gazala, 1 June 1942)

- 4th Battalion, East Yorkshire Regiment
- 4th Battalion, Green Howards
- 5th Battalion, Green Howards

151st Infantry Brigade

- 6th Battalion, Durham Light Infantry
- 8th Battalion, Durham Light Infantry
- 9th Battalion, Durham Light Infantry

2nd Free French Brigade (attached)

- 5th March Battalion
- 11 March Battalion
- 2nd Free French Engineer Company
- 21st, 23rd North African Anti-tank batteries
- 2nd Free French Field Ambulance

1st Greek Infantry Brigade(attached)

- 1st Greek Infantry Battalion
- 2nd Greek Infantry Battalion
- 3rd Greek Infantry Battalion
- 1st Greek Artillery Battalion
- 1st Greek Machine-Gun Company
- 1st Greek Engineer Company
- 1st Greek Field Ambulance

5th Indian Infantry Brigade (20—24 March 1943)

7th Indian Infantry Brigade (20—24 March 1943)

201st Guards Motor Brigade (14—22 April 1943)

Divisional Troops

- 50th Divisional artillery, Royal Artillery
  - 72nd Field Regiment (captured at Gazala, 1 June 1942)
  - 74th (Northumbrian) Field Regiment
  - 111th (Bolton) Field Regiment (joined 15 October, left 21 November 1942)
  - 124th Field Regiment (joined 22 June 1940)
  - 65th (8th London) Field Regiment (joined 19 November 1942, left 22 April 1943)
  - 102nd (Northumberland Hussars) Anti-Tank Regiment, Royal Artillery (joined 8 October 1942)
  - 34th Light Anti-Aircraft Regiment, Royal Artillery (joined 18 October, left 6 November 1942)
  - 25th Light Anti-Aircraft Regiment, Royal Artillery (joined 16 December 1942)
- 50th Divisional engineers, Royal Engineers
  - 232nd (Northumbrian) Field Company (captured at Gazala, 1 June 1942)
  - 233rd (Northumbrian) Field Company (joined 23 June 1940)
  - 505th Field Company
  - 235th (Northumbrian) Field Park Company
- 50th Division Signals, Royal Corps of Signals
- 2nd Battalion, Cheshire Regiment (machine gun battalion; joined 1 February 1941)
- Divisional Royal Army Service Corps
- Divisional Royal Army Medical Corps
- Intelligence Corps
  - 19 Field Security Section

50th (Northumbrian) Infantry Division (Sicily, 1943)

69th Infantry Brigade

- 5th Battalion, East Yorkshire Regiment
- 6th Battalion, Green Howards
- 7th Battalion, Green Howards

151st Infantry Brigade

- 6th Battalion, Durham Light Infantry
- 8th Battalion, Durham Light Infantry
- 9th Battalion, Durham Light Infantry

168th (London) Infantry Brigade (joined 27 April, left 10 October 1943)

- 1st Battalion, London Irish Rifles
- 1st Battalion, London Scottish
- 10th Battalion, Royal Berkshire Regiment

Divisional Troops

- 50th Divisional artillery, Royal Artillery
  - 74th (Northumbrian) Field Regiment
  - 90th (City of London) Field Regiment, Royal Artillery (joined 27 April 1943)
  - 124th Field Regiment
  - 102nd (Northumberland Hussars) Anti-Tank Regiment
  - 25th Light Anti-Aircraft Regiment
  - 98th Field Regiment (Surrey & Sussex Yeomanry, Queen Mary's) (attached for the invasion, and used M7 Priests)
- 50th Divisional engineers, Royal Engineers
  - 233rd (Northumbrian) Field Company
  - 501st Field Company, Royal Engineers (joined 27 April, left 10 October 1943, attached 168 Bde)
  - 505th Field Company, Royal Engineers
  - 235th (Northumbrian) Field Park Company
  - 50th Division Postal Unit, Royal Engineers
- 50th Division Signals, Royal Corps of Signals
- Royal Army Service Corps
  - 522nd (Ammunition), 523rd (Petrol) and 524th (Supply) Companies
- Royal Army Medical Corps
  - 149th, 186th and 200th Field Ambulances
  - 47th and 48th Field Dressing Stations
- Intelligence Corps
  - 19 Field Security Section
- 2nd Battalion, Cheshire Regiment
- 44th Royal Tank Regiment (attached for invasion)
- 'A' Squadron, Royal Dragoons (Armoured Car unit, attached for invasion)
- No. 34 Beach Brick (attached for invasion)

50th (Northumbrian) Infantry Division (North West Europe, 1944)

69th Infantry Brigade (reorganised as a Reserve Infantry Brigade, and returned to the UK December 1944)

- 5th Battalion, East Yorkshire Regiment
- 6th Battalion, Green Howards
- 7th Battalion, Green Howards

151st Infantry Brigade (reorganised as a Reserve Infantry Brigade, and returned to the UK December 1944)

- 6th Battalion, Durham Light Infantry
- 8th Battalion, Durham Light Infantry
- 9th Battalion, Durham Light Infantry (left 30 November 1944, joined 131st Brigade, 7th Armoured Division)
- 1/7th Battalion, Queen's Royal Regiment (West Surrey) (joined 4 December 1944)

231st Infantry Brigade (joined 13 August 1943, reorganised as a Reserve Infantry Brigade and returned to the UK December 1944)

- 2nd Battalion, Devonshire Regiment (left 30 November 1944, joined 131st Brigade, 7th Armoured Division)
- 1st Battalion, Dorsetshire Regiment
- 1st Battalion, Hampshire Regiment
- 1/6th Battalion, Queen's Royal Regiment (West Surrey) (joined 4 December 1944)

56th Independent Infantry Brigade (joined 4 April—10 June, 12—15 June 1944)

- 2nd Battalion, South Wales Borderers
- 2nd Battalion, Gloucestershire Regiment
- 2nd Battalion, Essex Regiment

32nd Infantry Brigade (Guards) (2—7 October 1944)

Divisional Troops

- 50th Divisional artillery, Royal Artillery
  - 74th (Northumbrian) Field Regiment
  - 90th (City of London) Field Regiment
  - 124th Field Regiment
  - 102nd (Northumberland Hussars) Anti-Tank Regiment
  - 25th Light Anti-Aircraft Regiment (left 30 November 1944, joined 53rd (Welsh) Infantry Division)
- 50th Divisional engineers, Royal Engineers
  - 233rd (Northumbrian) Field Company
  - 295th Field Company – (joined 23 September 1943)
  - 505th Field Company
  - 235th (Northumbrian) Field Park Company
  - 15th Bridging Platoon
  - 50th Division Postal Unit, Royal Engineers
- 50th Division Signal Regiment, Royal Corps of Signals
- Royal Army Service Corps
  - 356th General Transport, 508th, 522nd Infantry Brigade Companies
  - 524th Division Troops Company
- Royal Army Medical Corps
  - 149th, 186th and 200th Field Ambulances
  - 47th and 48th Field Dressing Stations
- Intelligence Corps
  - 19 Field Security Section
- 61st Reconnaissance Regiment, Reconnaissance Corps
- 2nd Battalion, Cheshire Regiment

Attached to the division for the assault phase of Operation Overlord:

- Royal Armoured Corps
  - Westminster Dragoons
  - Two Troops, 141st Royal Tank Regiment
- Royal Artillery
  - 86th (East Anglian) (Hertfordshire Yeomanry) Field Regiment, Royal Artillery
  - 147th (Essex Yeomanry) Regiment, Royal Horse Artillery
  - Batteries from 73rd Anti-Tank, 93rd, 120th Light Anti-Aircraft and 113th Heavy Anti-Aircraft Regiments
- Royal Engineers
  - 6th Assault Regiment, Royal Engineers
- Royal Army Medical Corps
  - 203rd Field Ambulance
  - 168th Light Field Ambulance
- Royal Marines
  - 1st Royal Marine Armoured Support Regiment
  - No. 47 (Royal Marine) Commando
- 104 Beach Sub-Area HQ
  - 9 and 10 Beach Groups

50th (Northumbrian) Infantry Division (Cold War)

The order of battle of the division in 1947 was as follows:

50th (Northumbrian) Infantry Division Headquarters, Newcastle upon Tyne

146th (West Riding) Infantry Brigade

- HQ 146th Infantry Brigade & Signal Section, Royal Signals
- 5th Battalion, West Yorkshire Regiment, York
- 7th Battalion, Duke of Wellington's Regiment, Milnsbridge
- 4th Battalion, King's Own Yorkshire Light Infantry, Wakefield
- 5th Battalion, King's Own Yorkshire Light Infantry, Wakefield
- The Hallamshire Battalion, Sheffield

149th (Northumberland) Infantry Brigade

- HQ 149th Infantry Brigade & Signal Section, Royal Signals
- 4th Battalion, Royal Northumberland Fusiliers, Hexham
- 7th Battalion, Royal Northumberland Fusiliers, Alnwick
- 8th Battalion, Durham Light Infantry, Durham

151st Infantry Brigade

- HQ 150th Infantry Brigade & Signal Section, Royal Signals
- 4th Battalion, East Yorkshire Regiment, Kingston upon Hull
- 4th Battalion, Green Howards, Northallerton
- 6th Battalion, Durham Light Infantry, Bishop Auckland

Division Troops

- 50th (Northumbrian) Divisional Signal Company, Royal Engineer, Darlington
- Northumberland Hussars, Newcastle upon Tyne, divisional reconnaissance
- 43rd (6th (City) Battalion, The Royal Northumberland Fusiliers) Royal Tank Regiment, Newcastle upon Tyne, divisional armoured unit
- 50th Divisional Royal Army Service Corps, Kingston upon Hull
- 50th Divisional Royal Army Ordnance Corps
- 50th Divisional Royal Electrical and Mechanical Engineers
- Royal Artillery
  - Commander Royal Artillery, Newcastle upon Tyne
  - CRA Headquarters
  - 271st (West Riding) Field Regiment, Sheffield
  - 272nd (Northumbrian) Field Regiment, Newcastle upon Tyne
  - 274th (Northumbrian) Field Regiment, South Shields
  - 631st (Green Howards) Anti-Tank Regiment, Royal Artillery, Scarborough
  - 588th (Royal Northumberland Fusiliers) Light Anti-Aircraft Regiment, Walker on Tyne (left 1959)
- Royal Engineers
  - Commander Royal Engineers, Newcastle upon Tyne
  - CRE Headquarters
  - 103rd Field Engineer Regiment, Newcastle upon Tyne
  - 50th Divisional Field Park

439 and 463 Light AD Regiments joined the divisional artillery from 1961; 623 LAA Regiment 1950 which then became 323 LAA Regiment, which stayed from 1950 to 1961 when it was absorbed into 271 Field Regiment.

== See also ==
- List of British divisions in World War II
- British Army Order of Battle (September 1939)
- British VCs of World War 2
- Monuments to Courage
- The Register of the Victoria Cross
