= Torteval =

Torteval may refer to:

- Torteval, Guernsey, one of the ten parishes of Guernsey
- Torteval-Quesnay, a former commune in the Calvados department in the Normandy region in northwestern France
