= Anctoville =

- Part of Aurseulles
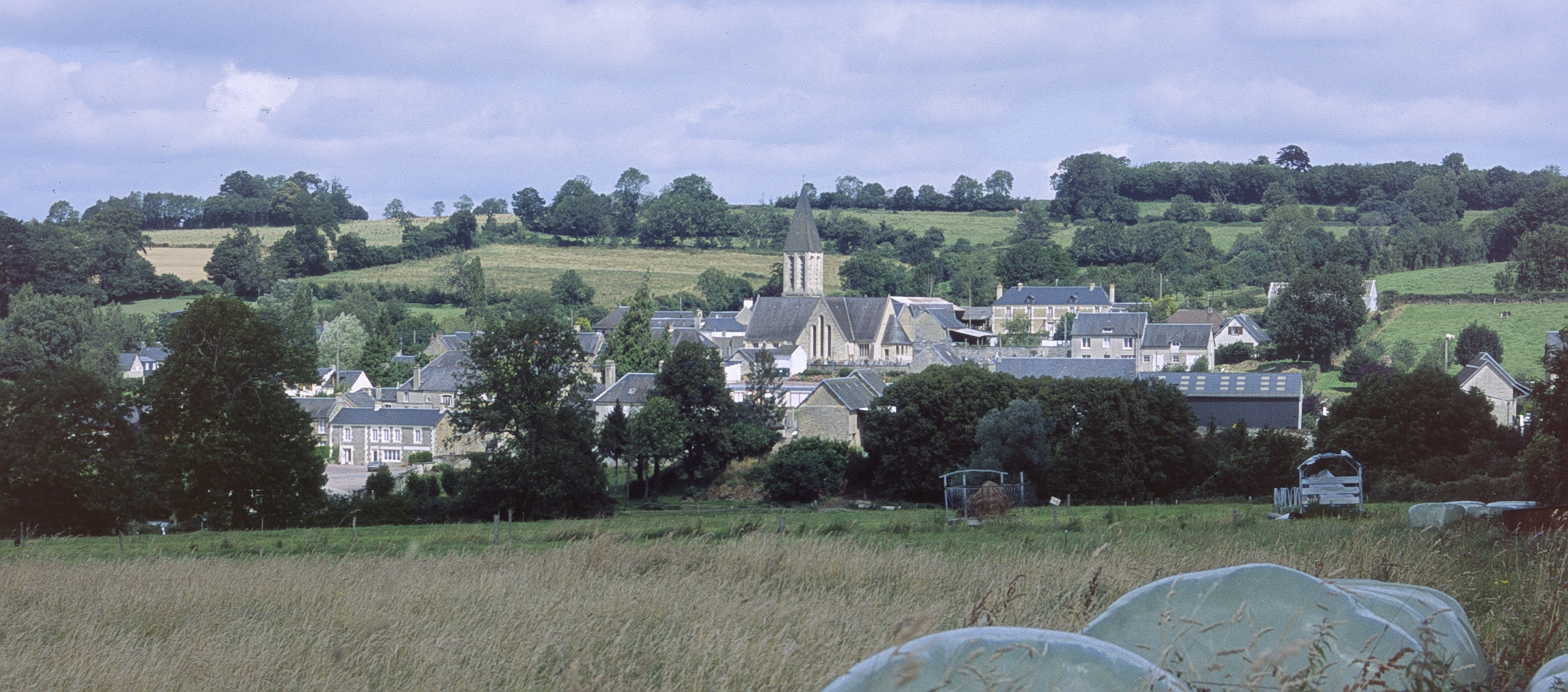
- Location of Anctoville
- Location within France Location within Normandy
- Coordinates: 49°06′22″N 0°42′20″W
- Country: France
- Region: Normandy
- Department: Calvados
- Arrondissement: Bayeux
- Canton: Les Monts d'Aunay
- Commune: Aurseulles
- Area^{1}: 17.48 km^{2} (6.75 sq mi)
- Elevation: 90 m (300 ft)
- Highest elevation: 158 m (518 ft)
- Lowest elevation: 62 m (203 ft)
- Population (2019): 1,081
  - Density: 61.84/km^{2} (160.2/sq mi)
- Time zone: UTC+01:00 (CET)
  - Summer (DST): UTC+02:00 (CEST)
- Postal code: 14240
- ^{1} French Land Register data, which excludes lakes, ponds, glaciers > 1 km^{2} (0.386 sq mi or 247 acres) and river estuaries.

Anctoville (French pronunciation: [ɑ̃ktɔvil]) is a former commune in the Calvados department in the Normandy region of north-western France. On 1 January 2017, it was merged into the new commune called Aurseulles.

== Geography ==
Anctoville is located some 30 km south-west of Caen and 5 km north-west of Villers-Bocage in the Bessin area of the Seulles valley. It can be accessed by the D67 road from Saint-Germain-d'Ectot in the north passing through the village and continuing south-east to Villers-Bocage. The D92 road also passes through the length of the commune and the village from south-west to north-east. In the north-east of the commune, the D33 road from Longraye in the north passes through and continues south-east to Villers-Bocage. Finally, in the north-east is also the D173A road connecting the D92 and the D67. The commune consists entirely of farmland except for two small areas of forest in the north.

The Ruisseau des Landes forms a part of the northern border. Le Candon stream passes through the commune flowing towards the north-east and forming part of the northern border of the commune. Le Seulles stream forms part of the southern border before flowing just south of the village then continuing north-east to form most of the eastern border joining Le Candon at the northern tip of the commune. The Ruisseau David forms the south-eastern border and flows north to join Le Seulles. Le Gallichon stream also forms part of the southern border before joining Le Seulles in the south.

== History ==
The name Anctoville comes from Asketillville, meaning "Anquetil farm" (Anquetovillethen laterAnctoville). Cf. Ancretteville-sur-Mer.

The former name of Anctoville was Coisnières or Cornières until 1616. Olivier Foulognes, the King's butler, bought the Lordship of Cornières and obtained a change of name. This fief became part of the Bailiwick of Briquessart. The oldest document showing the Parish of Coisnières dates back to the 12th century. It was a charter of confirmation of goods given by Henry, King of England and Duke of Normandy, at Lessay.

In June 1944, during the Battle of Villers-Bocage, Orbois castle housed the headquarters of the German armoured division Panzer Lehr commanded by Fritz Bayerlein. Anctoville was liberated on 1 August 1944 by the British 61st Reconnaissance Battalion. These events inspired a scenario in the video game Call of Duty 2 on the Xbox 360.

In 1973, Anctoville (population 394 in 1968) merged with Feuguerolles-sur-Seulles (with 70 inhabitants to the east of the territory), Orbois (120 inhabitants in the north), and Sermentot (182 inhabitants in the north-east). The communes retained the status of Associated communes of France.

== Administration ==
List of Successive Mayors

From	To	Name	Party	Position
?	2001	Albert Marie		
2001	2017	Gérard Leguay		Farmer

The council was composed of fifteen members:

- seven representing Anctoville,
- two representing the associated commune of Feuguerolles-sur-Seulles and one delegated mayor
- two representatives of Orbois and one delegated mayor
- four representatives of Sermentot and one delegated mayor

The mayor was assisted by two deputies.

== Demography ==
The inhabitants of the commune are known as Anctovillais or Anctovillaises in French. Anctoville itself had 1,210 inhabitants in 1806. The four communes that merged in 1973 had a total of 2,608 inhabitants in 1836 (1,173 in Anctoville, 299 in Feuguerolles-sur-Seulles, 233 in Orbois, and 903 in Sermentot).

Historical population

Year	Pop.	±% p.a.
1793	1,134	—
1800	910	−3.09%
1806	1,210	+4.86%
1821	1,167	−0.24%
1831	1,173	+0.05%
1836	1,173	+0.00%
1841	1,112	−1.06%
1846	1,043	−1.27%
1851	1,047	+0.08%
1856	998	−0.95%
1861	920	−1.61%
1866	931	+0.24%
1872	848	−1.54%
1876	830	−0.53%
1881	775	−1.36%
1886	721	−1.43%
1891	758	+1.01%
1896	713	−1.22%

Year	Pop.	±% p.a.
1901	723	+0.28%
1906	714	−0.25%
1911	742	+0.77%
1921	595	−2.18%
1926	574	−0.72%
1931	563	−0.39%
1936	500	−2.35%
1946	511	+0.22%
1954	432	−2.08%
1962	430	−0.06%
1968	394	−1.45%
1975	751	+9.65%
1982	817	+1.21%
1990	850	+0.50%
1999	905	+0.70%
2007	1,034	+1.68%
2012	1,076	+0.80%
2019	1,081	+0.07%

Source: EHESS and INSEE

== Economy ==
The commune has an essentially agriculture-oriented economy. At the communal inventory of 1998, it had 46 farms, 28 of which were of a professional standard classified by INSEE, for an area of 1,848 hectares used. There were 68 farms in 1988. The main production is the raising of cattle for milk and meat. Arable land is used for forage and grain crops.

== Culture and heritage ==
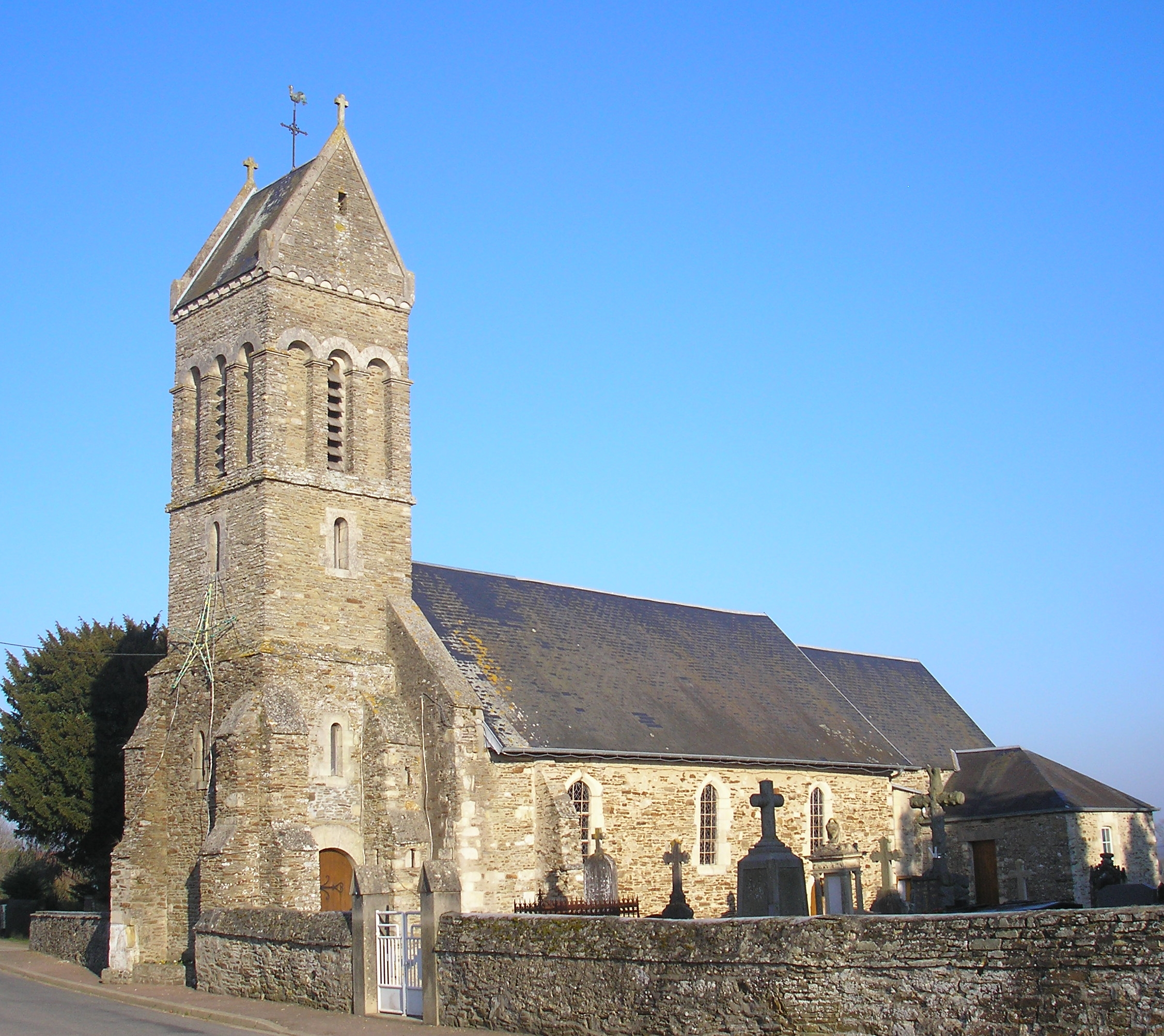
Saint Peter's Church at Feuguerolles.

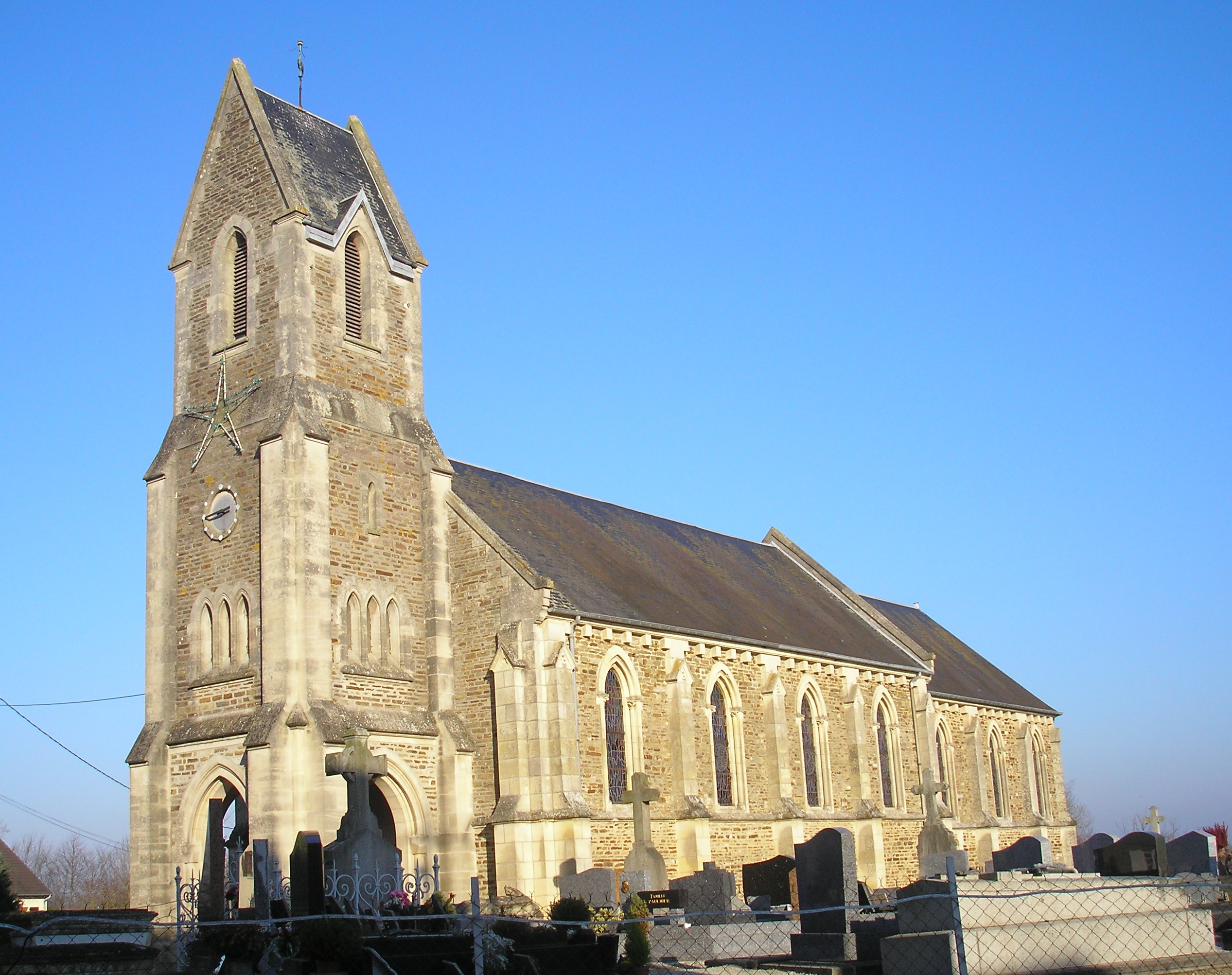
Church of Saint-Aubin at Sermentot.

=== Civil heritage ===
- The Orphanage Pierre Rayer was founded in 1883. This establishment occupied a castle from the 18th century with buildings from the 19th century. It has become a children's home of a social nature

=== Religious heritage ===
- The Church of Saint Peter (12th-17th century) at Feuguerolles
- The Church of Saint-Aubin (12th-17th century) at Sermentot
- The Church of Saint Peter (Roman era and 14th century) at Orbois houses a Statue: Madonna and Child (15th century) which is classified as an historical object
- The Church of Saint Nicolas (1956) at Anctoville is registered as an historical monument

== Notable people linked to the commune ==
- Marie Rayer, daughter of Dr. Pierre François Olive Rayer and wife of Marquis Stanislas d'Escayrac de Lauture, bequeathed her estate to the commune to create an orphanage
- Jean-Claude Hallais (born 1948), horse driver, winner of the Prix d'Amerique in 1992, based his team in Anctoville

== See also ==
- Communes of the Calvados department
- Anctoville-sur-Boscq
