= Aurseulles =

- Commune
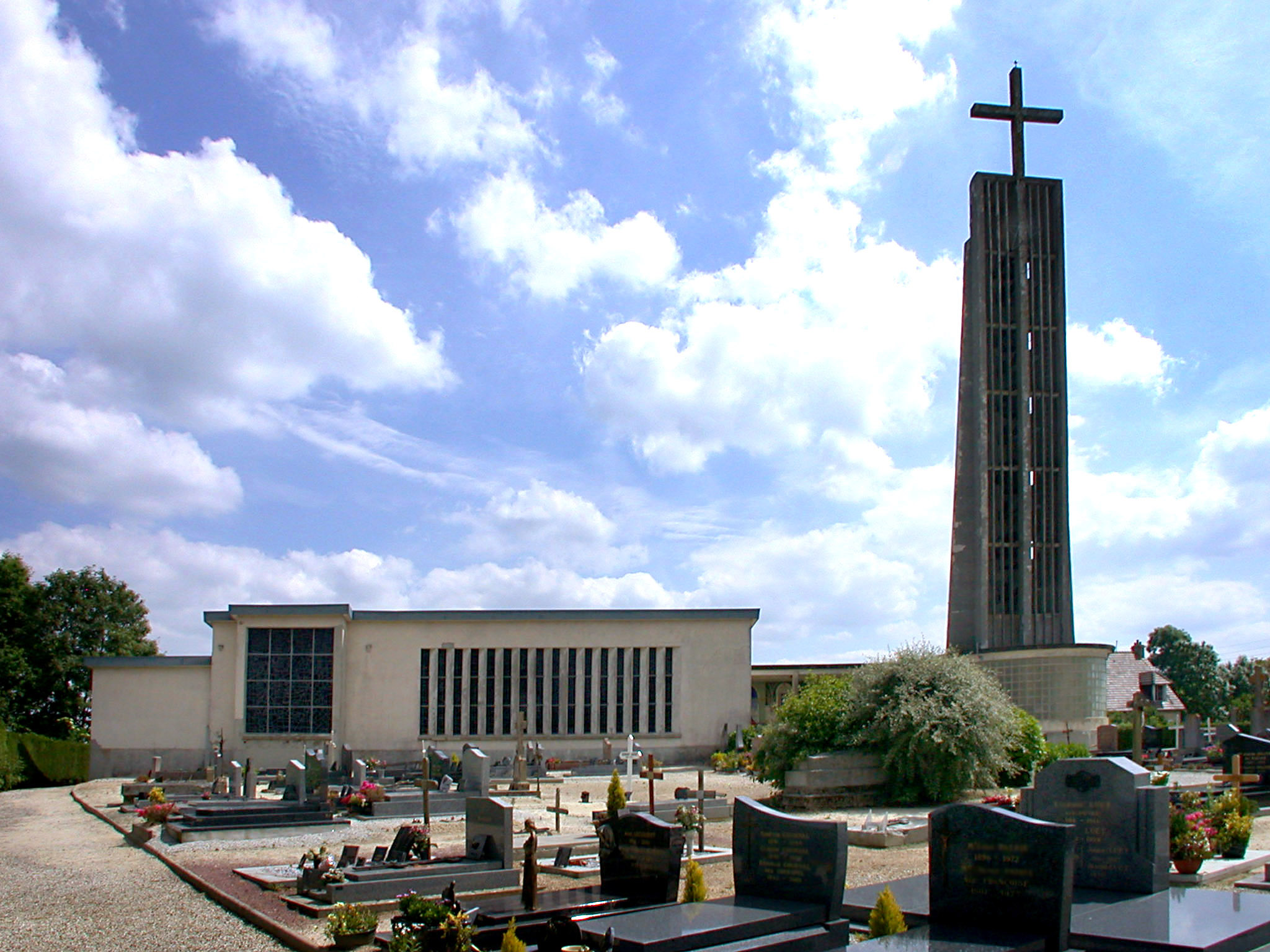
- The church in Ectot
- Location of Aurseulles
- Location within France Location within Normandy
- Coordinates: 49°06′18″N 0°42′25″W
- Country: France
- Region: Normandy
- Department: Calvados
- Arrondissement: Vire
- Canton: Les Monts d'Aunay
- Intercommunality: Pré-Bocage Intercom

Government
  - Mayor (2020–2026): Gérard Leguay
- Area^{1}: 46.00 km^{2} (17.76 sq mi)
- Population (2023): 1,896
  - Density: 41.22/km^{2} (106.8/sq mi)
- Time zone: UTC+01:00 (CET)
  - Summer (DST): UTC+02:00 (CEST)
- INSEE/Postal code: 14581 /14240, 14250
- ^{1} French Land Register data, which excludes lakes, ponds, glaciers > 1 km^{2} (0.386 sq mi or 247 acres) and river estuaries.

Aurseulles (French pronunciation: [ɔʁsœl]) is a commune in the Calvados department and Normandy region of north-western France. It was established on 1 January 2017 by the merger of the former communes of Anctoville, Longraye, Saint-Germain-d'Ectot and Torteval-Quesnay. The commune has its administrative offices in Anctoville.

== See also ==
- Communes of the Calvados department
