= Torteval-Quesnay =

- Part of Aurseulles
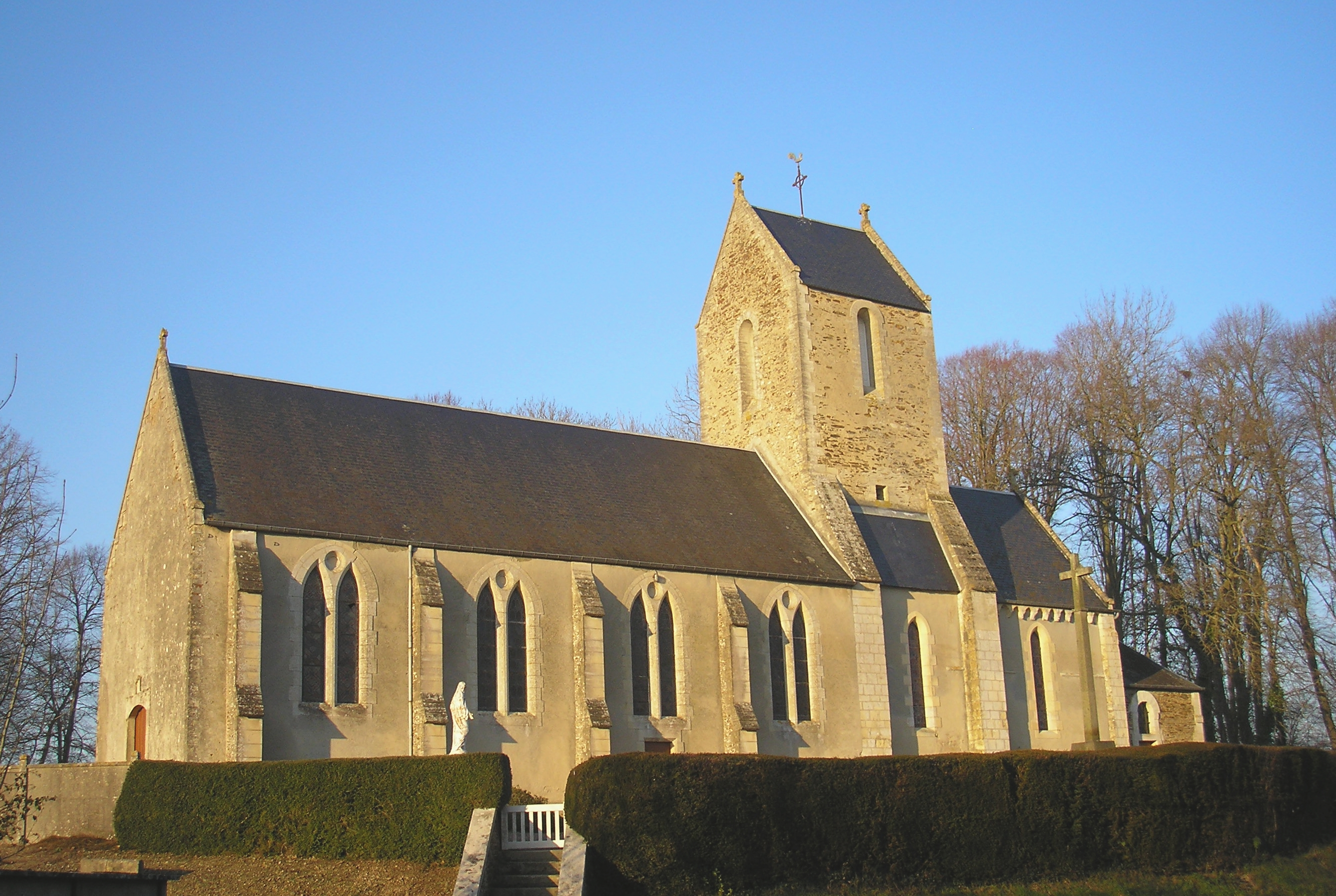
- Location of Torteval-Quesnay
- Location within France Location within Normandy
- Coordinates: 49°08′16″N 0°43′47″W
- Country: France
- Region: Normandy
- Department: Calvados
- Arrondissement: Bayeux
- Canton: Les Monts d'Aunay
- Commune: Aurseulles
- Area^{1}: 16.96 km^{2} (6.55 sq mi)
- Elevation: 100 m (330 ft)
- Highest elevation: 160 m (520 ft)
- Lowest elevation: 68 m (223 ft)
- Population (2023): 336
  - Density: 19.8/km^{2} (51.3/sq mi)
- Time zone: UTC+01:00 (CET)
  - Summer (DST): UTC+02:00 (CEST)
- Postal code: 14240
- ^{1} French Land Register data, which excludes lakes, ponds, glaciers > 1 km^{2} (0.386 sq mi or 247 acres) and river estuaries.

Torteval-Quesnay (French pronunciation: [tɔʁtəval kɛnɛ]) is a former commune in the Calvados department in the Normandy region in northwestern France. On 1 January 2017, it was merged into the new commune Aurseulles.

== See also ==
- Communes of the Calvados department
