= Saint-Germain-d'Ectot =

- Part of Aurseulles
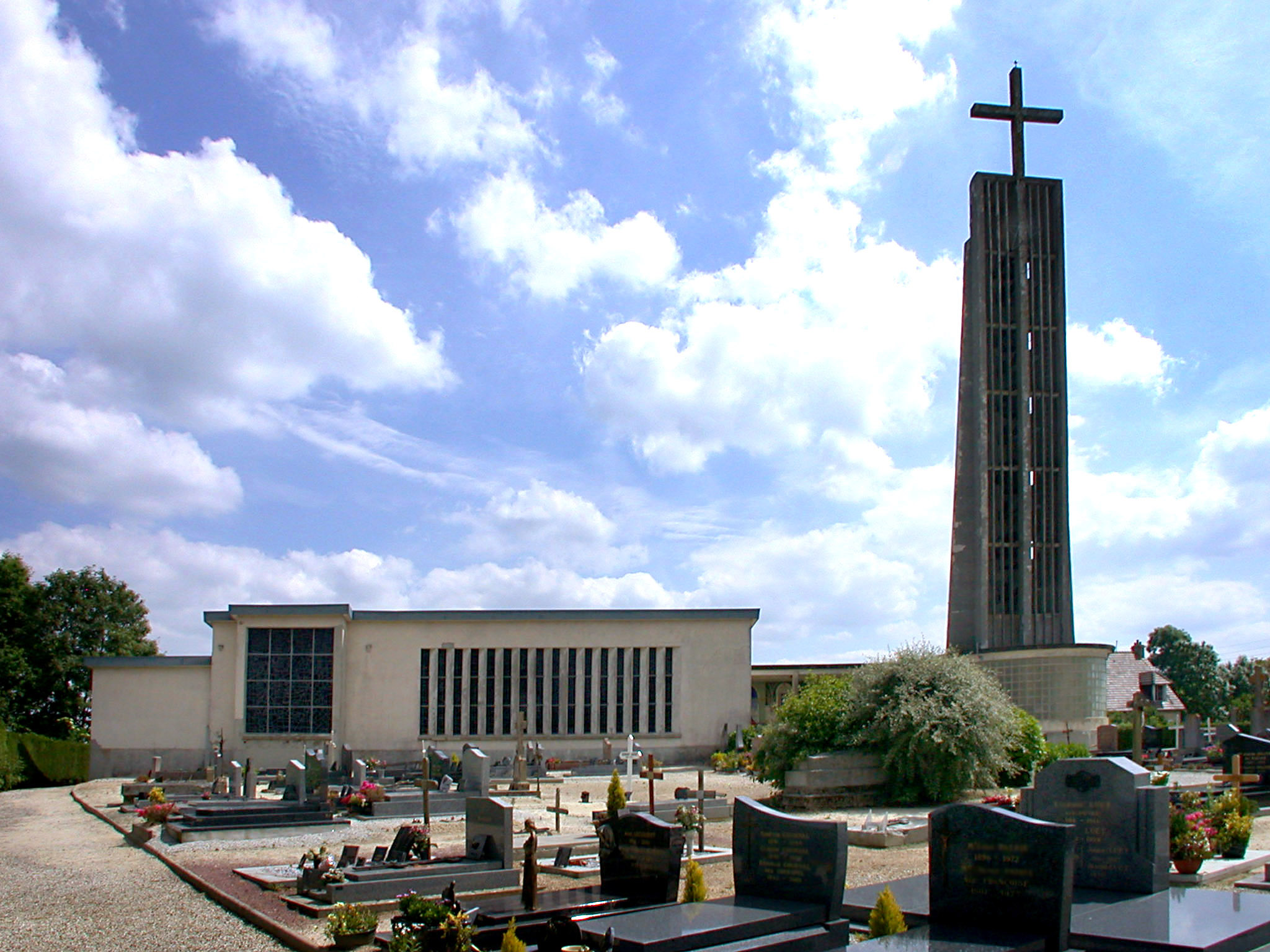
- Location of Saint-Germain-d'Ectot
- Location within France Location within Normandy
- Coordinates: 49°07′27″N 0°43′00″W
- Country: France
- Region: Normandy
- Department: Calvados
- Arrondissement: Bayeux
- Canton: Les Monts d'Aunay
- Commune: Aurseulles
- Area^{1}: 4.97 km^{2} (1.92 sq mi)
- Elevation: 141 m (463 ft)
- Highest elevation: 168 m (551 ft)
- Lowest elevation: 101 m (331 ft)
- Population (2023): 311
  - Density: 62.6/km^{2} (162/sq mi)
- Time zone: UTC+01:00 (CET)
  - Summer (DST): UTC+02:00 (CEST)
- Postal code: 14240
- ^{1} French Land Register data, which excludes lakes, ponds, glaciers > 1 km^{2} (0.386 sq mi or 247 acres) and river estuaries.

Saint-Germain-d'Ectot (French pronunciation: [sɛ̃ ʒɛʁmɛ̃ dɛkto]) is a former commune in the Calvados in the Normandy region in northwestern France. On 1 January 2017, it was merged into the new commune Aurseulles.

== See also ==
- Communes of the Calvados department
