= Longraye =

- Part of Aurseulles
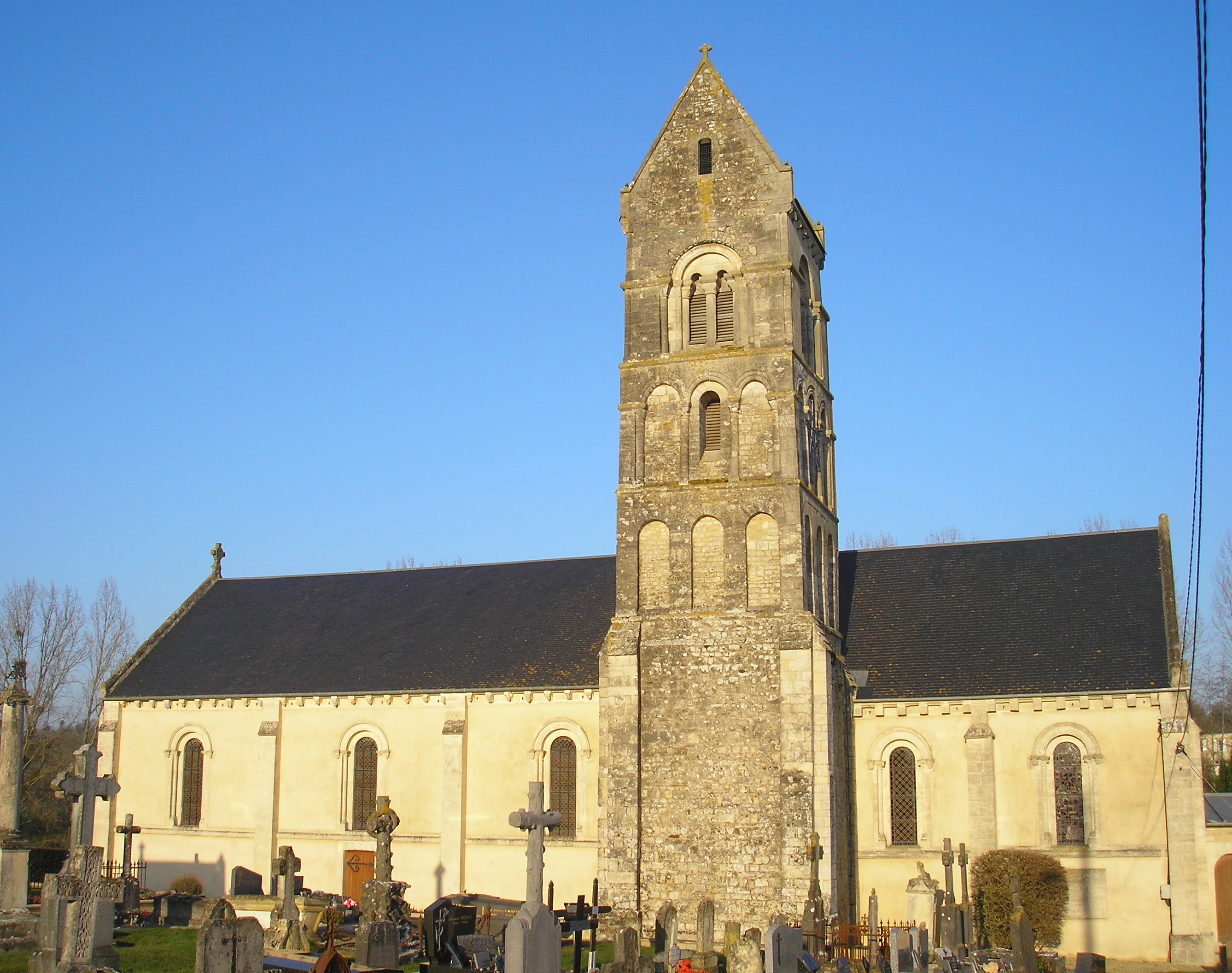
- Location of Longraye
- Location within France Location within Normandy
- Coordinates: 49°09′27″N 0°41′54″W
- Country: France
- Region: Normandy
- Department: Calvados
- Arrondissement: Bayeux
- Canton: Les Monts d'Aunay
- Commune: Aurseulles
- Area^{1}: 6.59 km^{2} (2.54 sq mi)
- Elevation: 133 m (436 ft)
- Highest elevation: 138 m (453 ft)
- Lowest elevation: 68 m (223 ft)
- Population (2023): 195
  - Density: 29.6/km^{2} (76.6/sq mi)
- Time zone: UTC+01:00 (CET)
  - Summer (DST): UTC+02:00 (CEST)
- Postal code: 14250
- ^{1} French Land Register data, which excludes lakes, ponds, glaciers > 1 km^{2} (0.386 sq mi or 247 acres) and river estuaries.

Longraye is a former commune in the Calvados department in the Normandy region in northwestern France. On 1 January 2017, it was merged into the new commune Aurseulles.

== See also ==
- Communes of the Calvados department
