= The Gambia Police Force =

Gambian national law enforcement agency

- Abbreviation: GPF

Agency overview
- Formed: 1965
- Preceding agencies: Gambia Constabulary; Gambia Regiment

Jurisdictional structure
- National agency (Operations jurisdiction): The Gambia
- Operations jurisdiction: The Gambia
- Area: 10,689 square kilometres (4,127 sq mi)
- Population: 1,882,450
- Legal jurisdiction: The Gambia
- Governing body: Minister of the Interior
- General nature: Civilian police

Operational structure
- Headquarters: GPF Headquarters, Ecowas Drive
- Sworn members: 5,000
- Elected officer responsible: Ebrima Mballow, Minister of the Interior
- Agency executive: Abdoulie Sanyang, Inspector General of Police

The Gambia Police Force is the primary independent domestic intelligence, security, and law enforcement agency in The Gambia. Under the Ministry of the Interior, the force is headed by an Inspector General of Police. The current size of the force is 5,000 uniformed and plain-clothed officers. The Gambia Police Force addresses corruption through a specialized unit focused on fraud and commercial crimes.

== History ==
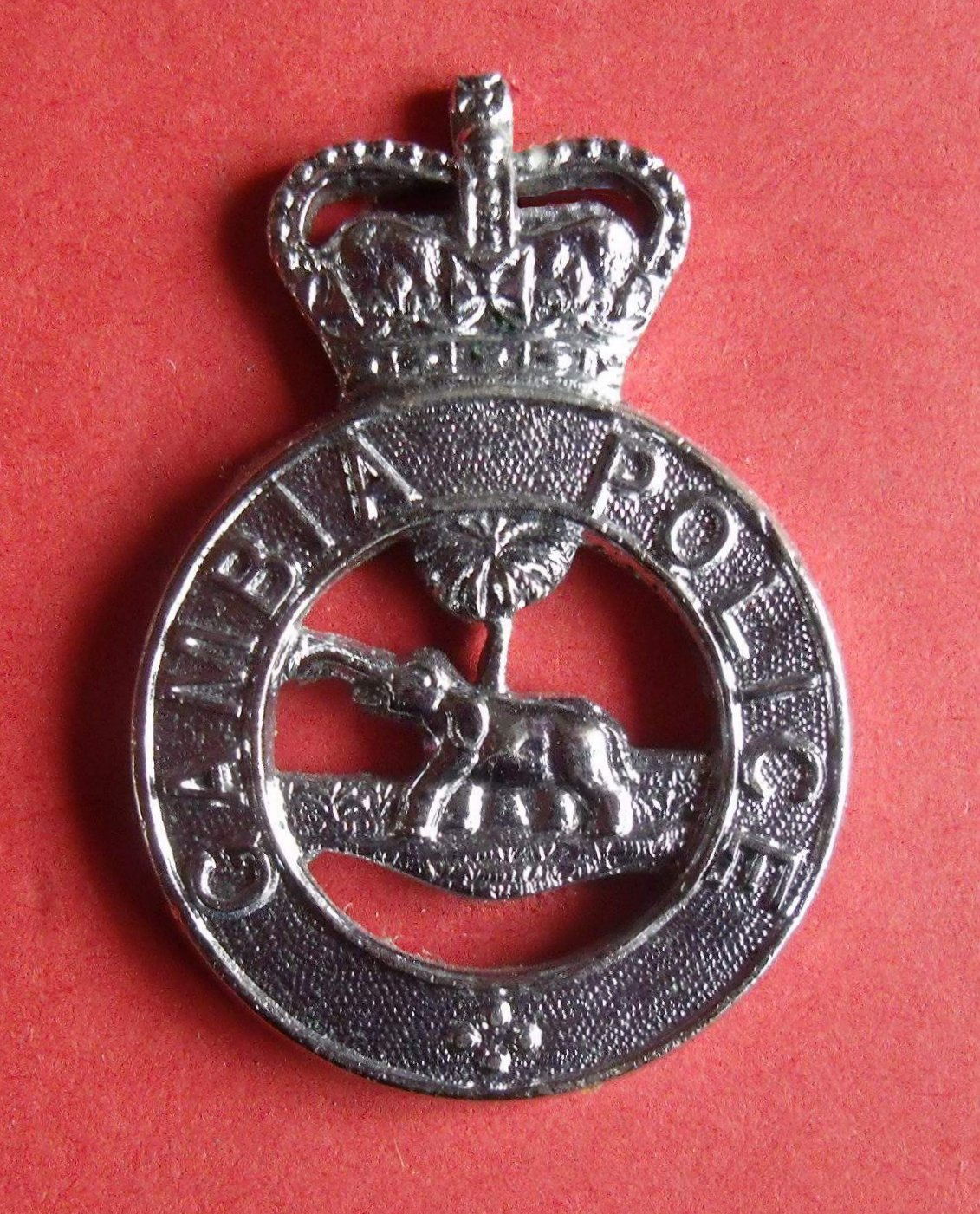
Colonial Gambian police cap badge.

The first police force in The Gambia was the Gambia River Police, formed in 1855. Before this, security in the small colonial enclaves was provided by British troops and a small local militia, drawn from traders, freed slaves, and other settlers. The River Police's role was to control smuggling, enforce taxation, and prevent insurgencies. The local militia aided 10 men and was further reinforced in 1866 by the establishment of the paramilitary Gambia Constabulary. Initially formed with 40 constables, this was increased to 100 in 1870. At this point, all imperial troops were withdrawn from the colony, and policing was left to the Constabulary and local militia.

A Frontier Police force was founded in 1895. The establishment of the West African Frontier Force in 1900 led to the creation of the Gambia Company in 1901, which also contributed to maintaining the colony's security. In the Protectorate, security was the responsibility of the district chief. In 1909, the British issued an ordinance granting the chiefs the power to appoint 'badge messengers', who were authorised to maintain law and order and had the same authority as the colony's police. Francis has noted how "Although Gambians staffed the lower level of the force, to the local population, the police and security services, limited as they were, represented an essentially foreign presence."

At independence in 1965, the Constabulary and Frontier Police merged to create The Gambia Police Force. Following the disbandment of the Gambia Regiment in 1958, the police assumed all defence responsibilities. A 200-man paramilitary force, the Gambia Field Force, which was part of the police after 1958, maintained responsibility for internal security.

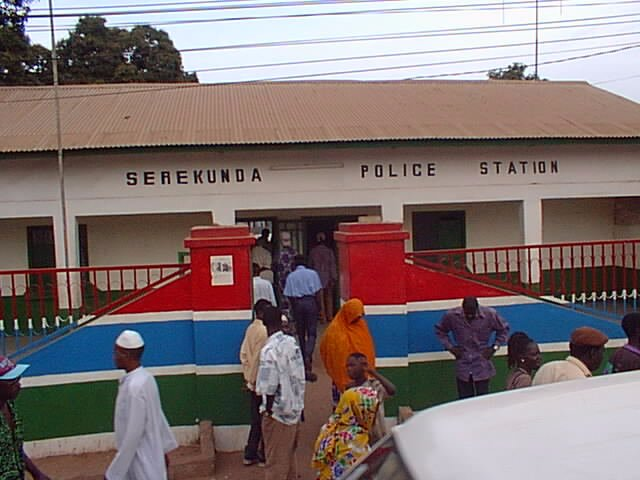
Serekunda Police Station.

== Operations ==
The GPF has a Sea Police Patrol Unit as well as a small Air Force, which is not yet operational.

== Training ==
The GPF operates the Gambia Police Force Peacekeeping Center (GPFPC), which collaborates with the Peace Operations Training Institute (POTI) to train peacekeepers.

== International cooperation ==
The Gambia Police Force has been a member of Interpol since 6 October 1986. The Interpol National Central Bureau (NCB) for The Gambia is located in the GPF headquarters in Banjul. It is headed by a Commissioner, who is assisted by an Assistant Superintendent of Police. Responsibilities of the NCB in The Gambia include human trafficking, terrorism, financial crime, fugitives, stolen works of art, and others.

== List of Inspectors General ==
Name	Previous role	Entered office	Left office
Ensa Badjie	The Inspector General of Police	2008	2 March 2010
Yankuba Sonko	The Inspector General of Police	2 March 2010	27 November 2014
Benjamin Wilson	The Inspector General of Police	27 November 2014	13 July 2015
Yankuba Sonko	The Inspector General of Police	13 July 2015	22 June 2017
Landing Kinteh	The Inspector General of Police	22 June 2017	21 June 2018
Momour Jobe	The Inspector General of Police	9 July 2018	13 March 2021
Abdoulie Sanyang	The Inspector General of Police	8 April 2021	
Seedy SM Touray	The Inspector General of Police	15 March 2024	Current
