= Antony Read =

British Army general

General Sir Antony Read GCB CBE DSO MC
- Born: 10 September 1913; London, England
- Died: 22 September 2000 (aged 87)
- Military career
- Allegiance: United Kingdom
- Branch: British Army
- Service years: 1934–1974
- Rank: General
- Service number: 62631
- Unit: Oxfordshire and Buckinghamshire Light Infantry
- Commands: Royal College of Defence Studies; Western Command; 50th (Northumbrian) Division/District; 3rd Infantry Brigade; 1st Battalion, Oxfordshire and Buckinghamshire Light Infantry; 1 Gambia Regiment
- Conflicts: Second World War; Cyprus Emergency
- Awards: Knight Grand Cross of the Order of the Bath; Commander of the Order of the British Empire; Companion of the Distinguished Service Order; Military Cross

General Sir John Antony Jervis Read, GCB, CBE, DSO, MC (10 September 1913 – 22 September 2000) was a senior British Army officer who served as Quartermaster-General to the Forces from 1969 to 1973. He was awarded the Military Cross (MC) for gallantry during the campaign against the Italian Army in East Africa in 1941, and appointed a Companion of the Distinguished Service Order (DSO) for his leadership and gallantry whilst in command of 1 Gambia Regiment in Burma in March 1945, during the Second World War.

== Military career ==
Born on 10 September 1913 in London, and educated at Sandroyd School and Winchester College, Read attended the Royal Military College, Sandhurst, from where he was commissioned into the Oxfordshire and Buckinghamshire Light Infantry of the British Army on 1 February 1934. He was seconded to the Gold Coast Regiment, part of the Royal West African Frontier Force, in 1936.

He saw active service in the Second World War and was awarded the Military Cross (MC) during the campaign against the Italians in East Africa in 1941. He became commanding officer (CO) of the Reconnaissance Regiment of the 81st (West Africa) Division in 1943. In 1944 he took command of 1 Gambia Regiment that was deployed to the Arakan in Burma: he was appointed a Companion of the Distinguished Service Order (DSO) for his service in Burma in March 1945.

Read became Deputy Assistant Military Secretary at the War Office in 1947 and a Company commander at the Royal Military Academy Sandhurst in 1949. He served as Assistant Adjutant and Quartermaster General at 11 Armoured Division from 1953. Read became Commanding Officer of the 1st Oxfordshire and Buckinghamshire Light Infantry at Osnabrück in 1955. The Regiment then deployed to Cyprus for a tour from 1956 to 1959.

In 1957 Read was promoted to brigadier and took over command of 3rd Infantry Brigade in Cyprus. In 1959 he was appointed Commandant of the School of Infantry at Warminster and in 1962 he became General Officer Commanding 50th (Northumbrian) Division/District of the Territorial Army. In 1964 he was appointed Vice-Quartermaster General at the Ministry of Defence and in 1966 he became General Officer Commanding-in-Chief of Western Command. Read was appointed Quartermaster General in 1969 and served to 1973. He was Commandant of the Royal College of Defence Studies in 1973.

Read was Colonel Commandant of the Light Division from 1968 to 1973. He was also ADC General to the Queen from 1971 to 1973.

Read was appointed a Companion of the Order of the Bath in 1965, a Knight Commander of the Order of the Bath in 1967 and a Knight Grand Cross of the Order of the Bath in 1972. He was also awarded an Officer of the Order of the British Empire in 1957 and a Commander of the Order of the British Empire in 1959.

== Retirement ==
Read was Governor of the Royal Hospital Chelsea from 1975 to 1981. He lived in Caversfield, near Bicester in Oxfordshire where Oxfordshire (RGJ) Battalion Army Cadet Force located and named their Cadet Training Center 'Read House' in his honour.

Read married Sheila Morris in 1947 with whom he was to have three daughters. Read died on 22 September 2000.

Military offices
Preceded by Charles Harington	Commandant of the School of Infantry; 1959–1962	Succeeded by Basil Eugster
Preceded by Lord Thurlow	GOC 50th (Northumbrian) Division/District; 1962–1964	Succeeded by Richard Keith-Jones
Preceded by Sir Richard Craddock	GOC-in-C Western Command; 1966–1969	Succeeded by Sir Napier Crookenden
Preceded by Sir Alan Jolly	Quartermaster-General to the Forces; 1969–1973	Succeeded by Sir William Jackson
Preceded by Sir Mervyn Butler	Commandant of the Royal College of Defence Studies; 1973–1974	Succeeded by Sir John Barraclough
Honorary titles
Preceded by Sir Charles Jones	Governor, Royal Hospital Chelsea; 1975–1981	Succeeded by Sir Robert Ford
