= Kyari Magumeri =

Nigerian soldier

Honourable Captain Chari Maigumeri MM BEM
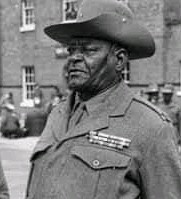
- Born: Kyari Magumeri; 1897; Magumeri, Bornu (today in Borno State, Nigeria)
- Died: 1972 (aged 74–75)
- Military career
- Allegiance: German Empire (1913–1917); United Kingdom (1917–1953)
- Branch: Imperial German Army; British Army
- Service years: 1913–1953
- Rank: Regimental sergeant major
- Service number: 10473
- Unit: 3rd Battalion Nigeria Regiment
- Conflicts: First World War; Kamerun campaign; Second World War; Abyssinian campaign; Burma campaign
- Awards: Iron Cross (2nd class); Military Medal; British Empire Medal

Kyari Magumeri MM BEM, also known as Chari Maigumeri, was a Nigerian soldier who fought in both World Wars. During the Great War, Magumeri served in the German Army. He received an Iron Cross medal but was later captured in Garua. After his release, he joined the Nigerian regiment and fought on the British side. He retired in 1953 and was given the honorary title of Captain.

== Life ==
Maigumeri was born in Bornu (today in Borno State, Nigeria) in 1897.

In 1913, Maigumeri crossed the border to German Kamerun and joined the Imperial German Army to fight against Britain during World War I. In 1915, he was awarded the Iron Cross (2nd class) medal for his efforts in fighting through a British ambush upon the death of his German officer.

During the Second Battle of Garua, Maigumeri was captured by the British army and taken to a prisoner of war camp. Upon his release in 1917, he offered to join the Nigeria Regiment. He was accepted by the British and after training, he was posted to the 3rd Battalion. He was given the rank of sergeant in 1920 and Company sergeant major in 1924. Just before the Aba Women’s Riot in 1929, he was given the rank of Regimental sergeant major.

During World War II, Maigumeri was posted to East Africa and then North Africa. He saw the capture of Mogadishu and fought through the Abyssinian campaign. At the end of this campaign, he was awarded the Military Medal.

After the defeat of Italy, Maigumeri's battalion was posted to Sierra Leone where he met other Nigerian recruits such as General Johnson Aguiyi-Ironsi. When his battalion was merged with the 81st and 82nd (West Africa) Division, he followed them to the Burma Campaign. In 1945, after the end of the war, he represented the 3rd Battalion in a victory parade in London and was awarded the British Empire Medal. He retired on 10 August 1953 as an honorary Captain in the Nigeria regiment. He was the first non-commissioned officer to be given the rank of Captaincy in British West Africa.
