= The Gambia in World War II =

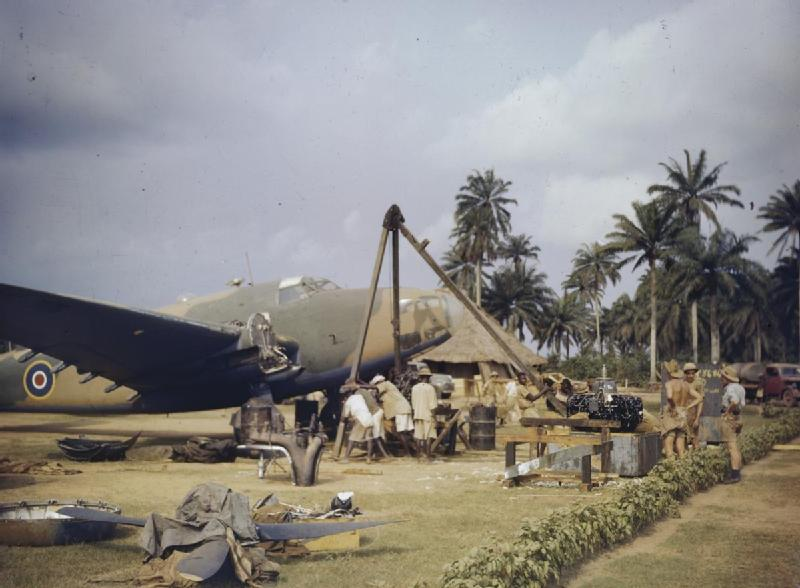
A Lockheed Hudson at RAF Yundum.

During the Second World War (1939–1945), the Gambia was part of the British Empire as the Gambia Colony and Protectorate. At the outbreak of war between the United Kingdom and Nazi Germany in September 1939, the Gambia was home to the Gambia Company of the Royal West African Frontier Force (RWAFF).

== Risk of invasion ==
After the Fall of France in 1940, the Gambia's neighbour Senegal aligned with the pro-German Vichy France regime. In September 1940, the Allies attempted but failed to capture Senegal in the Battle of Dakar. The failure of this increased the risk of an Axis invasion of the Gambia. In 1941, Lord Lloyd, the Secretary of State for the Colonies, asked for General Staff to draw up an Appreciation on Africa. In February 1941, this was completed and sent to Lloyd and Anthony Eden, the Secretary of State for Foreign Affairs. It made an assessment on the defence of British possessions in Africa, and stated that "The Gambia is not one of our essential possessions, and its capture by an enemy would not materially harm our prestige." The report noted that its proximity to Dakar made it "particularly vulnerable to attack by Vichy" and called for plans to be drawn up in the event of an attack, including an evacuation scheme.

Dudley Pound, the First Sea Lord, partially objected to the assessment of the Gambia's importance. In a letter dated 3 March 1941, he wrote: "While this may be strictly true, Bathurst is of some naval value as a fuelling point for naval vessels of low endurance which cannot reach Freetown, and the Admiralty is erecting oil fuel stores there." The Chiefs of Staff Committee approved a report by the Joint Planning Staff on the evacuation of the Gambia at a meeting on 22 March 1941.

== Home front ==
=== Home defence ===
The Gambia Local Defence Volunteers were founded in the war. It was later renamed as the Gambia Home Guard. The Gambia Naval Volunteer Force, part of the Royal Naval Volunteer Reserve (RNVR), was raised in 1935. In March 1938, it had six officers - five lieutenants, and Lieutenant Commander Alexander Skinner, the commanding officer.

=== Domestic politics ===
On 13 November 1941, members of the Bathurst Advisor Town Council (BATC) voted for Edward Francis Small to be appointed to the Legislative Council to replace the late W. D. Carrol. Small served from 1 January 1942, becoming the first Gambian member elected to the Legislative Council.

=== Governance ===
At the outbreak of World War II in September 1939, Thomas Southorn was the Governor of the Gambia, having been appointed to the role in October 1936. In March 1942, Hilary Blood was appointed as Governor and continued to serve until March 1947.

=== Economy ===
In 1940, the British passed the Colonial Development and Welfare Act 1940, which provided funding to research efforts in the colonies. In July 1941, a commission of inquiry was launched to investigate the wages of manual labourers in the Gambia. It was decided that a minimum wage for workers in Bathurst should be set. Also, during the war, a full income tax was established in the Gambia along with other West African British territories. Kenneth Blackburne, then Colonial Secretary, published a report in 1943 that assessed the long-term and immediate economic needs of The Gambia. It examined how best to use post-war funds from the Colonial Development and Welfare Act. Many of its recommendations were ignored, but it served as a blueprint for development from 1945 to 1950.

== Domestic military presence ==
=== RAF Bathurst ===
RAF Bathurst was formed in March 1941. It initially included three bases of operation, at Half-Die, Jeswang, and Yundum. A detachment from the anti-submarine No. 95 Squadron RAF was based at Bathurst from March 1941 to March 1943, before relocating wholly to Bathurst and remaining there until 30 June 1945. No. 95 Squadron was created to operate Short Sunderland flying boat patrol bombers. The biggest threat that the Squadron faced were Vichy French fighter aircraft based in Senegal, so in July 1941 it formed a Hawker Hurricane fighter wing.

In October 1941, this fighter wing became No. 128 Squadron RAF. A detachment of this Squadron was based in Jeswang from October 1941 to March 1943.

Other units based at RAF Bathurst include No. 228 Squadron RAF, from 28 August to 26 October 1941, and a detachment from No. 270 Squadron RAF from November 1942 to July 1943.

On 11 November 1943, a Royal Air Force Volunteer Reserve (RAFVR) Catalina IB with the callsign FP122 crashed in the river while coming in to land at RAF Bathurst. All five crewmembers were killed.

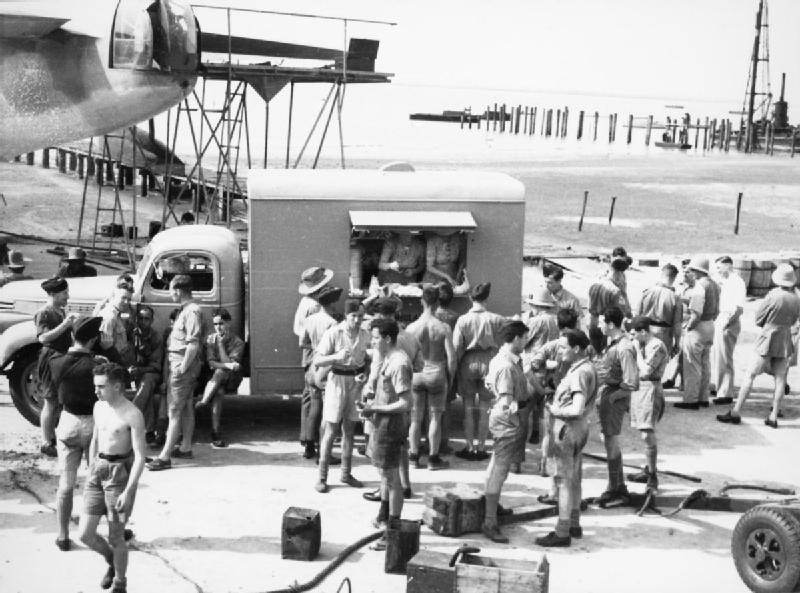
RAF personnel at RAF Bathurst.

=== RAF Yundum ===
RAF Yundum was primarily home to No. 200 Squadron RAF. It was also home to No. 82 Squadron, No. 128 Squadron, No. 541 Squadron, the HQ of No. 295 Wing, and No. 54 Staging Post. The airfield is now Banjul International Airport.

=== Medical aid and hospitals ===
The Gambia was home to a number of military hospitals during the Second World War. 55 British General Hospital was stationed in Bathurst from April 1941 to May 1942, 40 British General Hospital was stationed there from May 1942 to May 1943, and 55 British General Hospital was again stationed in Bathurst from January 1945 to January 1946. A Red Cross Committee was also founded in the Gambia in order to assist British soldiers detained in French West Africa.

== Gambia Regiment ==
The Gambia Regiment was formed out of the Gambia Company of the Royal West African Frontier Force (RWAFF) in 1940. Originally at battalion strength, in 1941 a second battalion was also raised. The 1st Battalion served in the Burma Campaign from 1944 to 1945.

== 1943 visit of Franklin D. Roosevelt ==
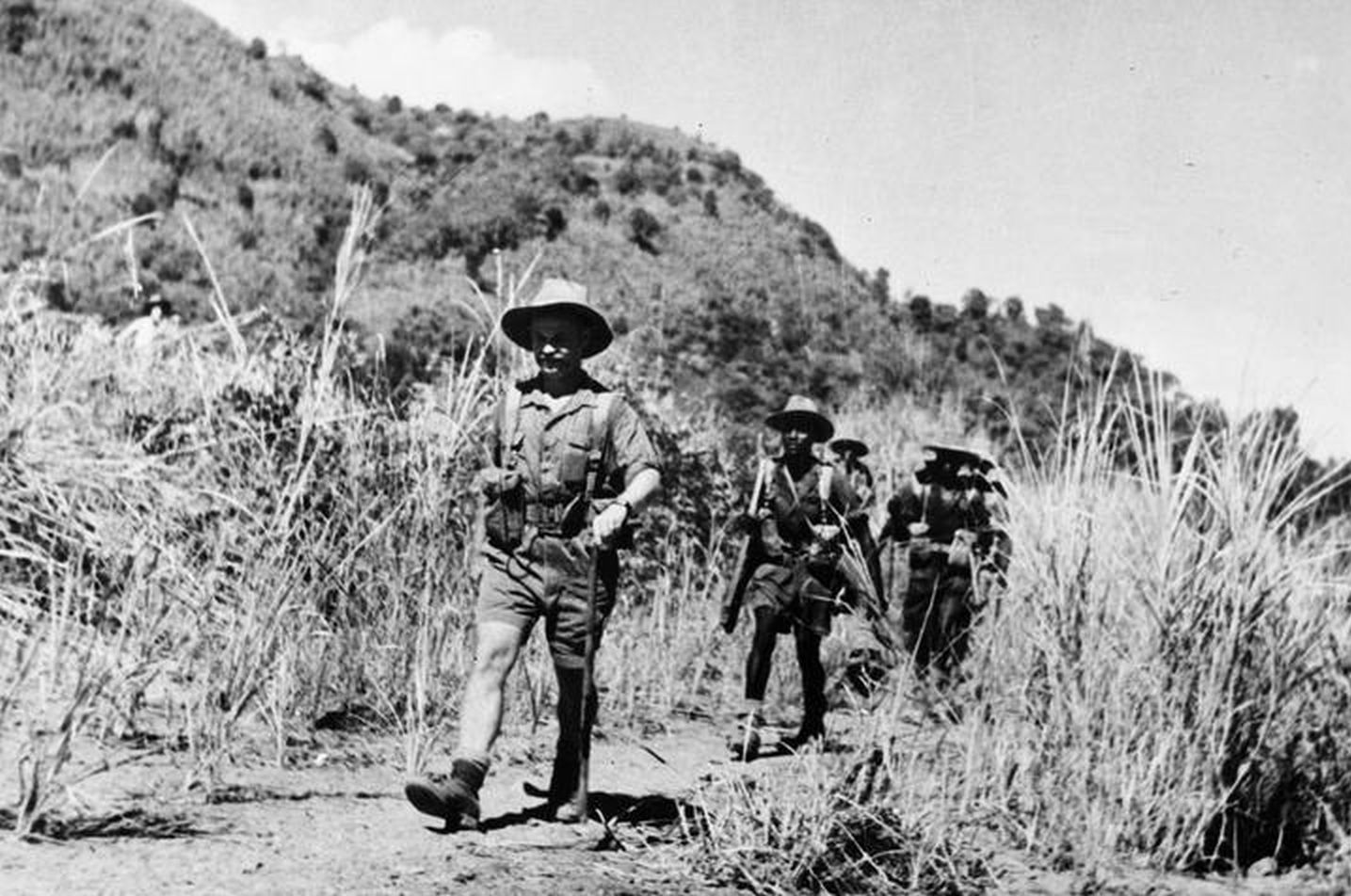
Soldiers of the Gambia Regiment on patrol in Burma, 1945.

Franklin D. Roosevelt, the President of the United States, visited the Gambia in 1943. He was appalled by the poverty he encountered in Bathurst and the experience contributed to his growing antipathy towards the British Empire.

== Connection to HMS Gambia ==
The Colony-class light cruiser HMS Gambia, which saw active service during World War II, took its name from the colony. It maintained a connection with the Gambia throughout its service, and on 28 May 1943, called at Bathurst when it was en route to Cape Town.

== Legacy ==
The Gambia is also home to Fajara War Cemetery, now maintained by the Commonwealth War Graves Commission, which contains 203 Commonwealth burials from World War II, four of which are unidentified.
