= Gambia Constabulary =

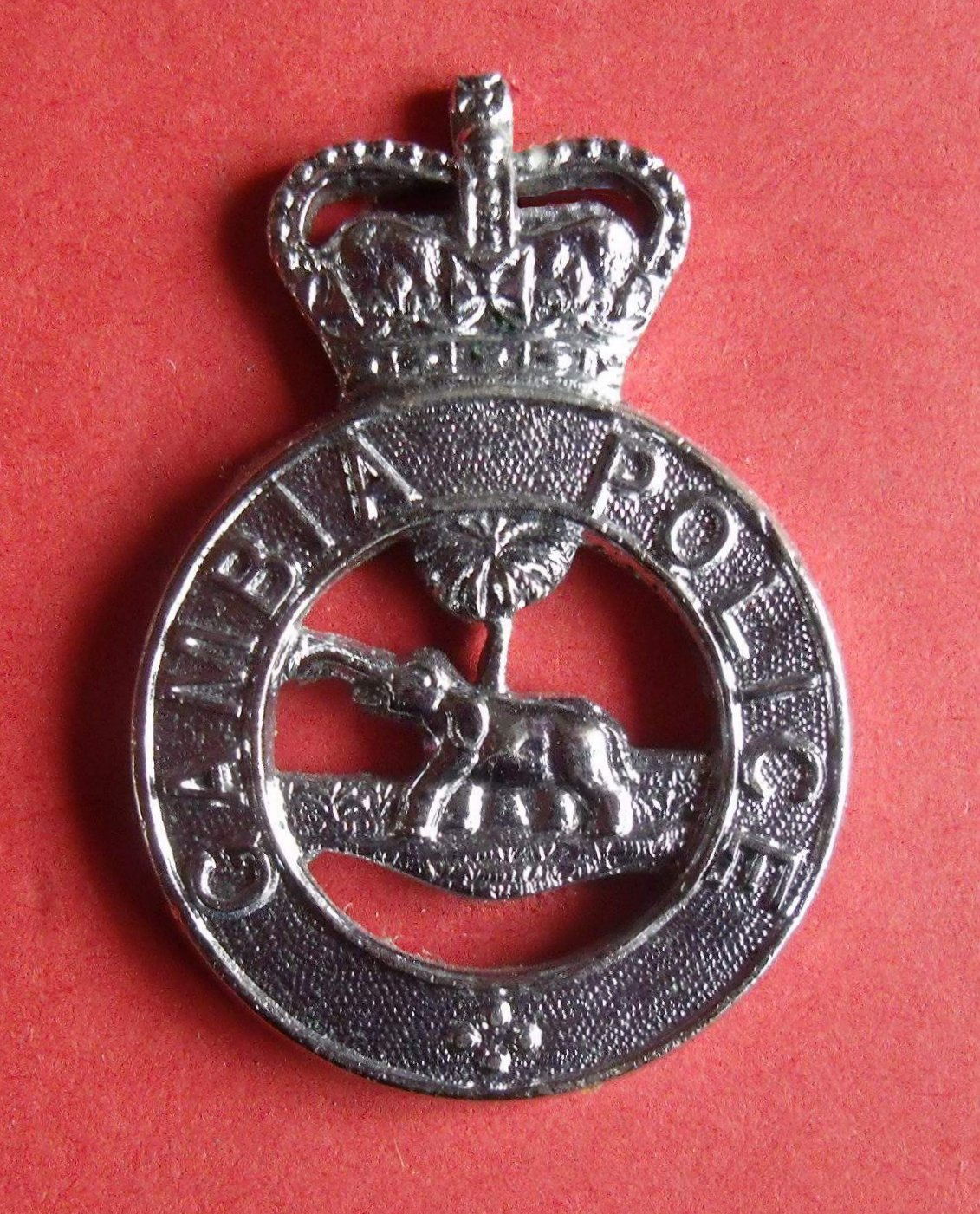
- Cap badge, pre-independence.
- Common name: Gambia Police

Agency overview
- Formed: 1866
- Preceding agency: Gambia River Police
- Dissolved: 1965
- Superseding agency: Gambia Police Force

Jurisdictional structure
- Operations jurisdiction: The Gambia

Operational structure
- Headquarters: Bathurst, The Gambia
- Police constables: 40–1000

The Gambia Constabulary, also known as the Gambia Police, was the colonial police force of The Gambia, in existence from 1866 to 1965. The constabulary has been described as paramilitary, and the colonial authorities themselves described it as "semi-military". The constabulary for a period also had responsibility for firefighting during the colonial reign.

== History ==
The first police force in The Gambia was the Gambia River Police, formed in 1855. Prior to this, security in the small colonial enclaves was provided by British troops and a small local militia, drawn from traders, freed slaves, and other settlers. The River Police's role was to control smuggling, enforce taxation, and prevent insurgencies. Its 10 men were aided by the local militia, and were further reinforced in 1866 by the establishment of the paramilitary Gambia Constabulary. Initially formed with 40 constables, this was increased to 100 in 1870. At this point, all imperial troops were withdrawn from the colony and policing was left to the Constabulary and local militia.

In February 1895, a complementary police force, the Gambia Frontier Police, was formed. In November that year, they became very riotous and assaulted members of the Constabulary. A civilian was shot dead by them while he was at his morning prayers. The police then entered Bathurst with loaded rifles, causing great alarm among the populace. The citizens proceeded to approach the Administrator en masse to demand their expulsion. The authorities relented and the force was shipped abroad before being disbanded in Sierra Leone.

The establishment of the West African Frontier Force in 1900 led to the creation of the Gambia Company in 1901, which also aided in maintaining the colony's security. In the Protectorate, security was the responsibility of the district chief.

In 1909, the British issued an ordinance granting the chiefs to appoint 'badge messengers', who were allowed to keep the peace and had all the same authority of the colony police. Francis has noted how "Although Gambians staffed the lower level of the force, to the local population, the police and security services, limited as they were, represented an essentially foreign presence."

== Organisation ==
In 1905, the constabulary was headed by a Superintendent who was assisted by an Assistant Superintendent. Under them were 80 non-commissioned officers, 68 of whom were posted in Bathurst and the other 12 were posted across the Protectorate. The constabulary also had a band, trained by a European bandmaster.

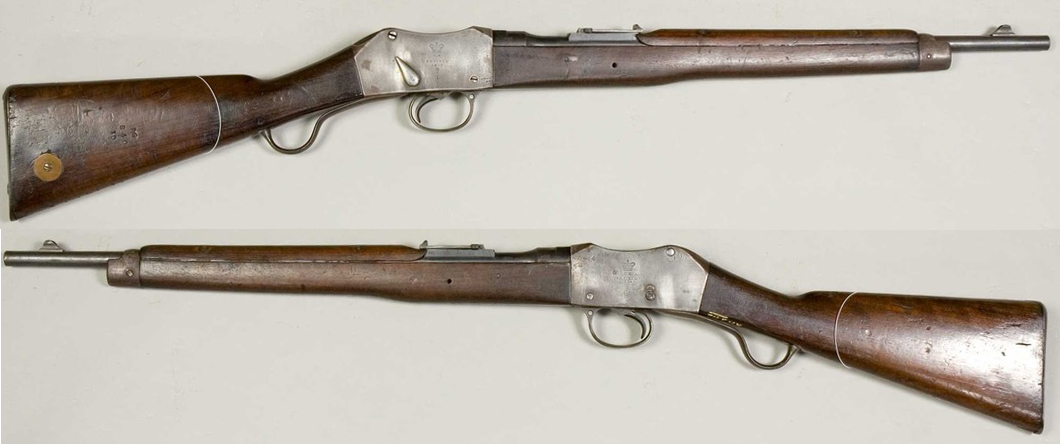
Martini-Enfield carbines, which were used by the constabulary at the beginning of the 20th century.

== Equipment ==
As part of their firefighting responsibilities, the constabulary had a 30-man Merryweather manual fire engine. In 1905, the constabulary was equipped with Martini–Enfield carbines, and had three seven-pounder RML guns.
