= Adunni =

Nigerian Given Name

Àdùnní
- Gender: Female
- Language: Yoruba

Origin
- Language: Nigerian
- Meaning: One who is pleasant to have
- Region of origin: Southwest

Àdùnní // is a Yoruba female given name that means "one who is pleasant to have". Àdùnní is an Orúkọ Oríkì (panegyrics), which, in the Yoruba language, are used to evoke desired virtues and characteristics.

== Notable people bearing the name ==
- Adunni Ade, Nigerian American actress and model
- Adunni Oluwole (1905–1957), Nigerian pre-independence politician and human rights activist
- Adunni Bankole, Nigerian Businesswoman
