= No. 270 Squadron RAF =

Defunct flying squadron of the Royal Air Force

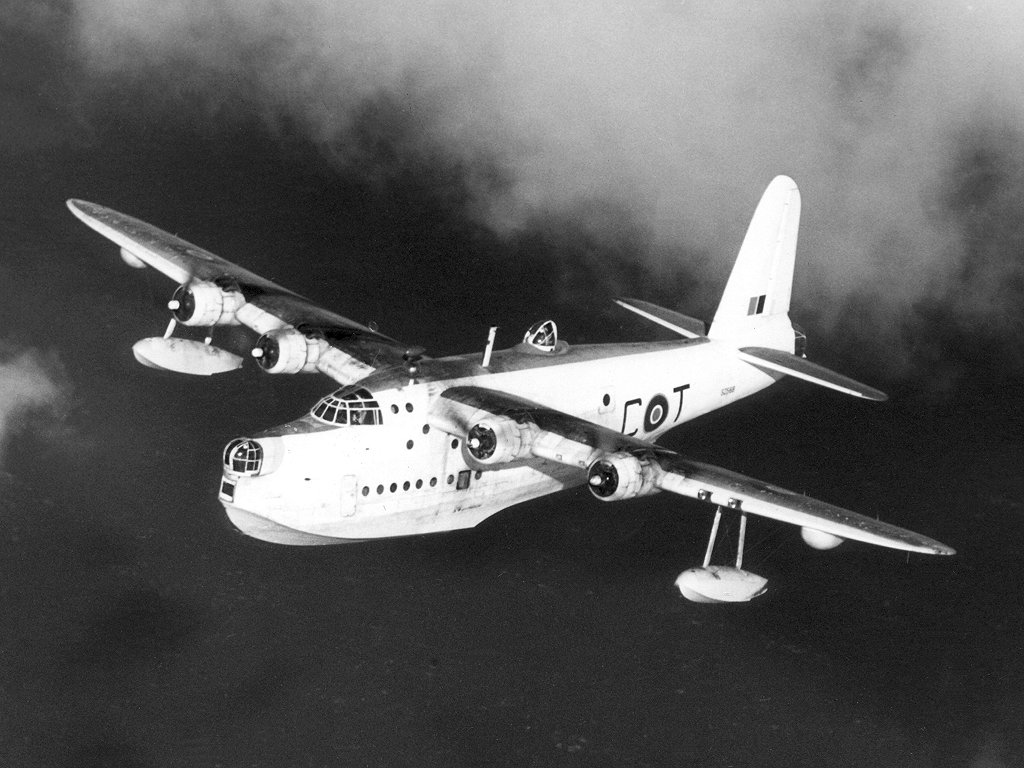
- Short Sunderland
- Active: 6 October 1918 - 15 September 1919; 12 November 1942 – 30 June 1945
- Country: United Kingdom
- Branch: Royal Air Force
- Type: Flying squadron
- Role: Maritime patrol and anti-submarine warfare
- Part of: West Africa Command

No. 270 Squadron RAF was a Royal Air Force squadron which disbanded at the end of June 1945. It operated both in the First and Second World War, mainly as an anti-shipping and anti-submarine squadron. It initially formed during October 1918 lasting around eleven months and disbanded in September 1919, merging into No. 269 Sqn. It reformed in November 1942.

== First World War ==
No. 270 Squadron was formed at RAF Alexandria in Egypt from three flights (354, 355 and 356), on 6 October 1918. (Nos 354, 355 & 356 (Flying Boat) Flights were planned to be formed at Alexandria, on 6 October 1918. Seaplane Squadron, Alexandria was a designation for the merging of 354, 355, and 356 Coastal Patrol Flights prior to becoming 270 Squadron) It was equipped with floatplanes and flying boats, operating with Felixstowe F.3, Sopwith Baby and Short Type 184. The main role was coastal reconnaissance which it continued to do until it was disbanded on 15 September 1919 when it was absorbed into 269 Squadron.

== Second World War ==
The squadron was re-formed on 12 November 1942 at RAF Jui, in Sierra Leone, with Consolidated Catalina IB an American flying boat and amphibious aircraft. It flew sorties into the mid-Atlantic off West Africa on anti-submarine patrols, sinking a U-boat in January 1943. It was also tasked with finding ships trying to break the blockade on Vichy France ports. The squadron had detachments at RAF Bathurst, in the Gambia, and Fisherman's Lake, in western Liberia.

In July 1943 the squadron moved to Lagos, in Nigeria, to be based at RAF Apapa and at the end of that year it re-equipped with the four-engined Short Sunderland flying boat patrol bomber. The squadron operated detachments at RAF Jui, Abidjan and Libreville. No. 270 Squadron was disbanded, after the war in the Atlantic had ended, on 30 June 1945 at Apapa, Nigeria.

== Aircraft operated ==
Dates	Aircraft	Variant	Notes
1918	Short 184		Single-engined torpedo seaplane
1918	Felixstowe F.3		Twin-engined reconnaissance flying boat
1918	Sopwith Baby		Single-engined seaplane
1942–1944	Consolidated Catalina	IB	Twin-engined flying boat
1943–1945	Short Sunderland	III	Four-engined flying boat
