= Laminu Njitiya =

19th-century Bornu aristocrat

Laminu Njitiya (died 1871) was a 19th-century Shuwa Arab aristocrat who served as an influential adviser to Umar Kura bin Muhammad al-Kanemi, the Shehu of Bornu. He was often described as the most powerful figure in Bornu during the second reign of Umar (1854 to 1881).

Initially a highway bandit, Laminu became a follower of influential courtiers of the Shehu, including Mallam Tirab, and later his son, al-Hajj Bashir. As the chief assistant of Bashir, he was infamous for carrying out the dirty work of his master, which he did with ruthless efficiency. After Bashir's death in 1853, Laminu became Umar's closest adviser. This position granted him considerable influence and wealth in Bornu. He was known for his competence as an administrator and is remembered as the greatest 19th-century fief-holder in Magumeri.

== Early life ==
Laminu Njitiya was of mixed Shuwa Arab and Kanembu descent. He began his career as a highwayman in Magumeri, a fief of Mallam Tirab, an influential adviser to Muhammad al-Kanemi, the Shehu of Bornu. Njitiya eventually abandoned banditry to follow Mallam Tirab and quickly rose through the ranks of Tirab's large following. After Mallam Tirab's death in 1846, his son al-Hajj Bashir succeeded him on the Shehu's council, inheriting Tirab's influence and followers, including Njitiya.

== Wakil of al-Hajj Bashir ==
Laminu became the most trusted companion of al-Hajj Bashir, who appointed him as Wakil (chief assistant). Bashir frequently relied on Laminu for executing his dirty work, which he performed with "complete loyalty and ruthless efficiency." Dr Heinrich Barth, a German explorer who visited Bornu in the 1850s, described Laminu as the "shameless left hand of the Vizier," condemning him for his "hard-heartedness and total want of gentle feelings."

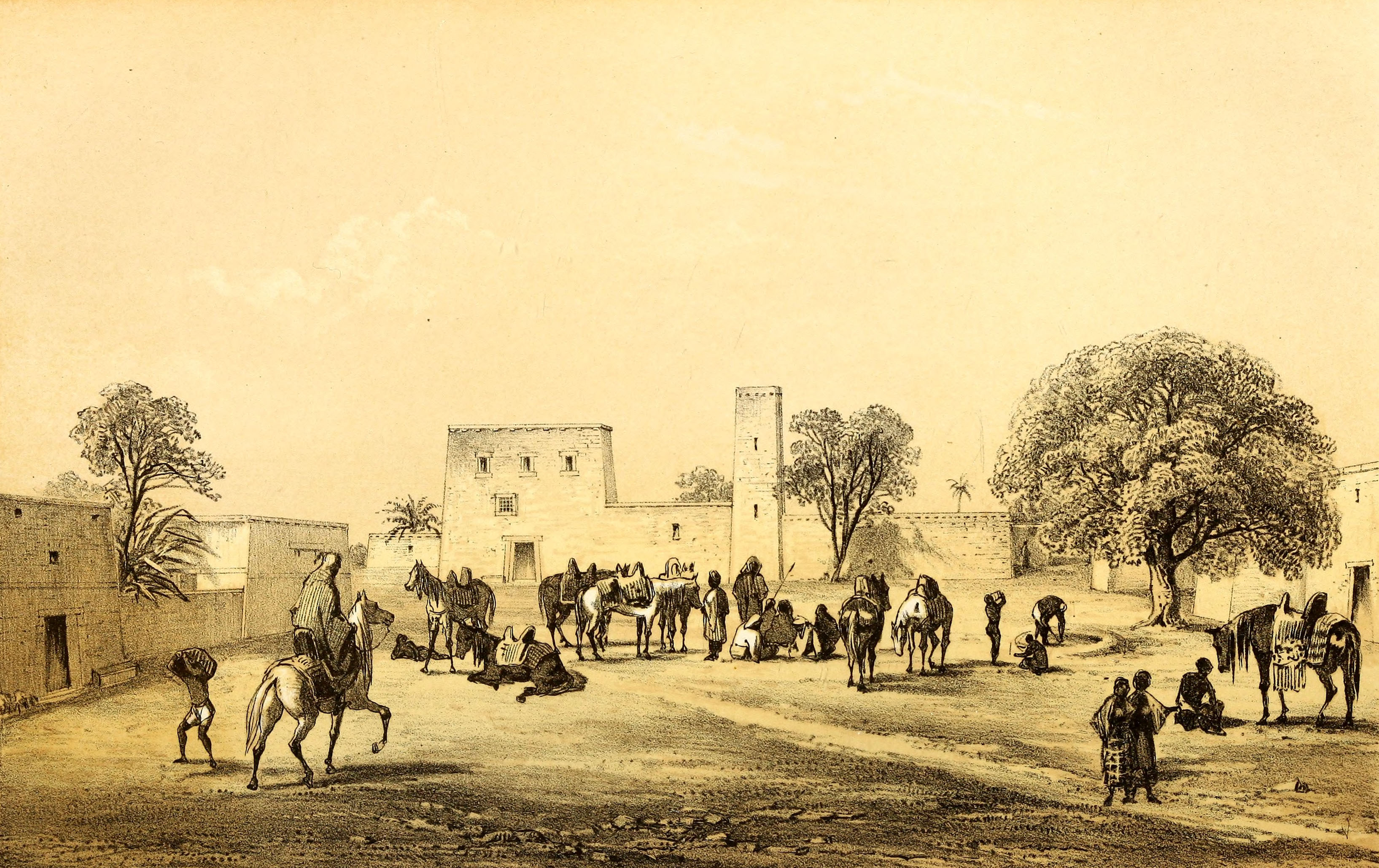
The palace of the Shehu in Kukawa (1857)

Bashir became a very influential member of Shehu Umar's council, eventually assuming the role of Waziri (Vizier). Shehu Umar's dependence on Bashir granted him immense power, which drew animosity from the other courtiers, particularly Abdurrahman, Umar's brother, who wanted to become Shehu. This tension led to open conflict in November 1853, forcing the Shehu to impose a curfew in Kukawa, Bornu's capital. Laminu was tasked with enforcing it, leading a contingent of the Waziri's slaves and followers. While carrying out this assignment, he got involved in a skirmish with the supporters of Abdurrahman, suffering a broken hand.

This skirmish further escalated the discontent in Kukawa. The two factions eventually clashed in battle, resulting in a defeat for the Shehu's faction. Consequently, Abdurrahman was quickly installed as Shehu, while Bashir fled the capital, and Laminu went into hiding.

The reign of Abdurrahman was very short. After he killed al-Hajj Bashir, his courtiers eventually came to despise his rule, viewing him as a tyrant. Since the main objection to Umar's rule was his reliance on Bashir, who was now dead, the courtiers launched another coup, leading to Umar's restoration as Shehu in early September 1854.

== Shehu Umar's second reign ==
After Abdurrahman was deposed, Laminu returned to Kukawa to serve directly under Shehu Umar. Laminu grew close to Umar and eventually became a member of his council. Following the death of al-Hajj Bashir, Abdurrahman had confiscated his properties and slaves, but after Umar's return to power, Laminu was granted a large portion of Bashir's fief, leaving only a few villages to Abba Salih, Bashir's younger brother. This reward was given in recognition of Laminu's loyalty and exceptional leadership abilities.

Due to his growing wealth, Laminu amassed a large following, consisting mostly of former supporters of al-Hajj Bashir. Contrary to his reputation during his time doing Bashir's dirty work, Laminu became very popular in Kukawa. He was known for his competence as an administrator and is remembered in Magumeri as its greatest 19th-century fief-holders, with the district's population more than doubling under his leadership. He led several expeditions, which resulted in the Bornu army conquering large portions of the Marghi country, located to the south of the kingdom.

Laminu's popularity, combined with Shehu Umar's confidence in him, made Laminu one of the most powerful and effective leaders in Bornu. Although he became as influential as his former master before his death, he seemed to have managed to handle it better. Despite having powerful enemies, he always maintained a larger number of friends.

== Death ==
Laminu died on 4 February 1871. Gustav Nachtigal, a German explorer who was in Kukawa at the time, considered his death a great calamity for Bornu and for Umar who had lost his only 'honest adviser'. Nachtigal recorded the reaction in Kukawa after his death:

"The grief extended no less to the Shaikh and many of the citizens of the capital. What would he do without this honest adviser, this path-finder through every difficulty, this one true man among a court of sycophants, this one asset among a collection of debts? In the streets of the city one perceived the general calamity brought about by the death of this man. All business stopped; the cheerful character of the people of the capital seemed for a day to have died; people spoke and thought of nothing save the great grief."

According to Nachtigal, Laminu left an estate of: "several thousand slaves, nearly 1,000 stallions and many broodmares, some thousand head of cattle, 27 rooms with stores of cloth and other market goods, about 1,000 swords, 500 shields, several hundred muskets and carbines, 200 coats of mail and 20,000 Maria Theresa dollars in cash."

After Laminu's death, his son Abba Aji (also known as Sanda Laminumi) inherited his fief and part of his wealth but was soon dispossessed following a serious conflict with Shehu Bukar. He was later reappointed as the District Head of Magumeri and became a successful trader during colonial Borno. Abba Aji died in 1916, and his son, Abba Kyari (also known as Baba Sandabe), succeeded him as District Head of Magumeri. Kyari's son, Abba Sadiq, eventually became the Waziri of Borno under Shehu Mustafa bin Umar al-Kanemi.
