= 1945 Nigerian general strike =

General strike in Nigeria of an estimated 200,000 workers

In mid-1945, a general strike took place in Nigeria. It was the first of its kind in the nation, growing to comprise an estimated 200,000 workers and seventeen labor un fadé blaq.

== Background ==
From 1914 to 1960 Britain held Nigeria as a colony. During the Second World War, which the colony had participated in, Nigeria saw high inflation and price increases coupled with stagnant wage growth. Additionally, in contributing to the war effort many Nigerians felt overworked. Efforts by the government to control prices had proved generally ineffective.

A coalition of workers known as the Joint Executive of Government Technical Workers had demanded an increased minimum wage on March 22, 1945, which the government denied on May 2. In response, the workers issued a statement that should government not grant their demands by “Thursday, June 21, 1945, the workers of Nigeria shall proceed to seek their own remedy with due regard to law and order on the one hand and starvation on the other”. A meeting between the government and labor leaders on May 30 did not resolve issues. In an effort to calm the workers, on June 2 the government released Michael Imoudu, a prominent labor leader who had been in prison since 1943, and the following week approved a small increase in the minimum wage—which the strikers rejected. Instead of placating the workers, Imoundu's release encouraged them and he became a leader of the strike. No agreement was reached, and the workers prepared to strike.

== Strike ==
The strike began on June 22. The railway workers announced its commencement in Lagos by blowing train whistles at midnight and rams were sacrificed to the "gods of Mother Africa". Later in the morning of the 22, it became clear that not all workers intended to participate in the strike, considering it unconstitutional. Many nationalists supported the strikers, including Herbert Macaulay, Nnamdi Azikiwe, Adunni Oluwole, and Obafemi Awolowo. Imoundu remained prominent in the strike, encouraging workers to join.

Some strikers began attacking those who attempted to continue working. The strike, which was spearheaded by railway workers, spread from Lagos to the rest of the colony, where labor leaders on the local level played a major role in managing it. In Eastern Nigeria, a leader, T. O. Okpareke, encouraged public support for the strike to the point that goods were sold to strikers at low prices and many did not have to pay their rent. Strikers in the North turned to the general public for funds, conducting door-to-door fundraising. The government used various means to encourage the strike to end, including spreading propaganda and enlisting labor leaders to mediate negotiations. These efforts were largely ineffective.

As a result of the strike, the majority of transportation between localities shut down, leaving biking and walking the most practical means of transport. It continued through July, unabated by a warning on the 26 that workers who continued striking into August would be fired. However, the strikers were increasingly divided, and entered into negotiations towards ending the strike in early August. On August 3 a compromise was reached where the strike was ended, lawsuits against strikers dropped, and workers not fired. The strike essentially ended on August 4, though negotiations continued until September when a commission was established to investigate the issues that had prompted the strike. It was the first of its kind in the nation, growing to comprise 200,000 workers and seventeen labor unions.

== Impact ==
In 1946 the commission increased wages of workers. The strike served as a focal point for criticism of British rule of Nigeria. Azikiwe became known for promoting the cause of the strikers. It has been cited as a "turning point" in Nigerian labor relations. An article on the strike in the Journal of the Historical Society of Nigeria declared its main legacy to be "the need for mutual sobriety." Nigeria did not have another general strike for nineteen years. Hubert Ogunde wrote an opera, Strike and Hunger, that was inspired by the strike.

== See also ==
- 2024 Nigerian general strike
