= 81st (West Africa) Division =

WW2 British Army formation

81st (West African) Division
- Formation sign of the 81st (West African) Division.
- Active: 1943–1945
- Allegiance: United Kingdom
- Branch: British Army
- Type: Infantry
- Size: 15,000 personnel
- Part of: Fourteenth Army (United Kingdom)
- Engagements: Second World War: Burma Campaign

Commanders
- Notable commanders: Christopher Woolner; Frederick Joseph Loftus-Tottenham

The 81st (West African) Division was formed under British control during the Second World War. It took part in the Burma Campaign.

== History ==
The inspiration for the division's formation came from General George Giffard, commander of the British Army's West Africa Command, who subsequently commanded Eastern Army, facing the Japanese army on the frontier between India and Burma. Giffard had wide experience with African troops, and was eager for them to participate in the war. The framework on which the division was formed was the Royal West African Frontier Force. One of the brigades (the 3rd West African) and several of the supporting units which formed the division had already seen action with the 11th (African) Division, against the Italians in East Africa. The division was established as the 1st (West African) Division on 1 March 1943. Three days later it was renamed the 81st (West African) Division, taking the next vacant number in the list of British infantry divisions. The division's badge was a spider, in black on a yellow circular background. This spider was a reference to Ananse, a cunning character in Ashanti mythology, and drawn so that when a soldier raised his weapon to fire, the spider would appear to be going forwards.

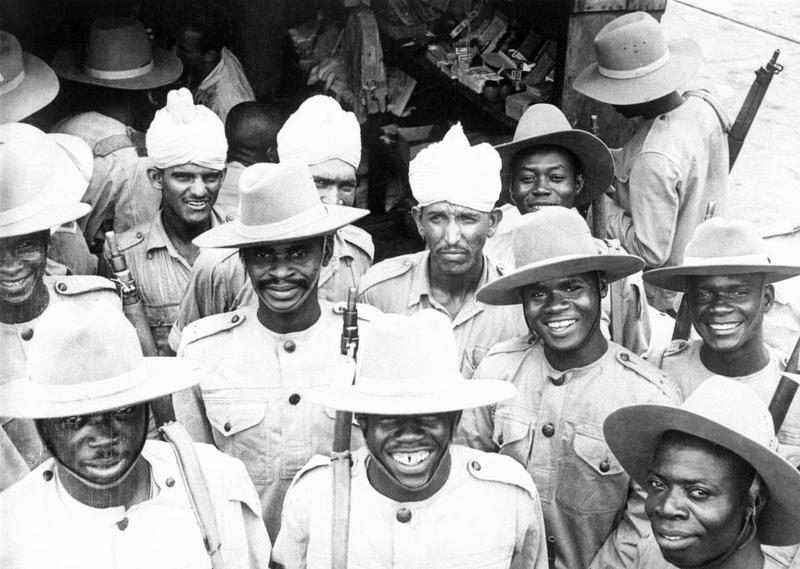
Men of the 81st West African Division mingle with Indian soldiers after their arrival in India for jungle training.

The division arrived in India on 14 August 1943. The movement of the 5th (West African) Brigade was delayed, however, after the troopship which was to carry it was lost in the German attack on Convoy Faith off Portugal on the night of 11/12 July 1943. The 3rd (West African) Brigade was detached to the Chindits, and was intended to garrison jungle bases for the raiding columns. The remainder of the division took part in the second Arakan campaign from February to May, 1944, operating in the Kaladan Valley on the flank of XV Indian Corps. In late March, substantial Japanese reinforcements (with some troops from the Indian National Army) outflanked the division and forced it to retreat over a range of hills out of the Kaladan valley into that of the Kalapanzin. In August, the division re-entered the Kaladan valley, forcing the Japanese and Indian National Army to abandon Mowdok, a few miles east of the India–Burmese frontier. The division then advanced down the valley once again, reaching Myohaung near the mouth of the river on 28 January 1945. The division was withdrawn to India to rest on 22 April 1945. On 31 August, it was returned to West Africa and disbanded.

== Character and organisation ==
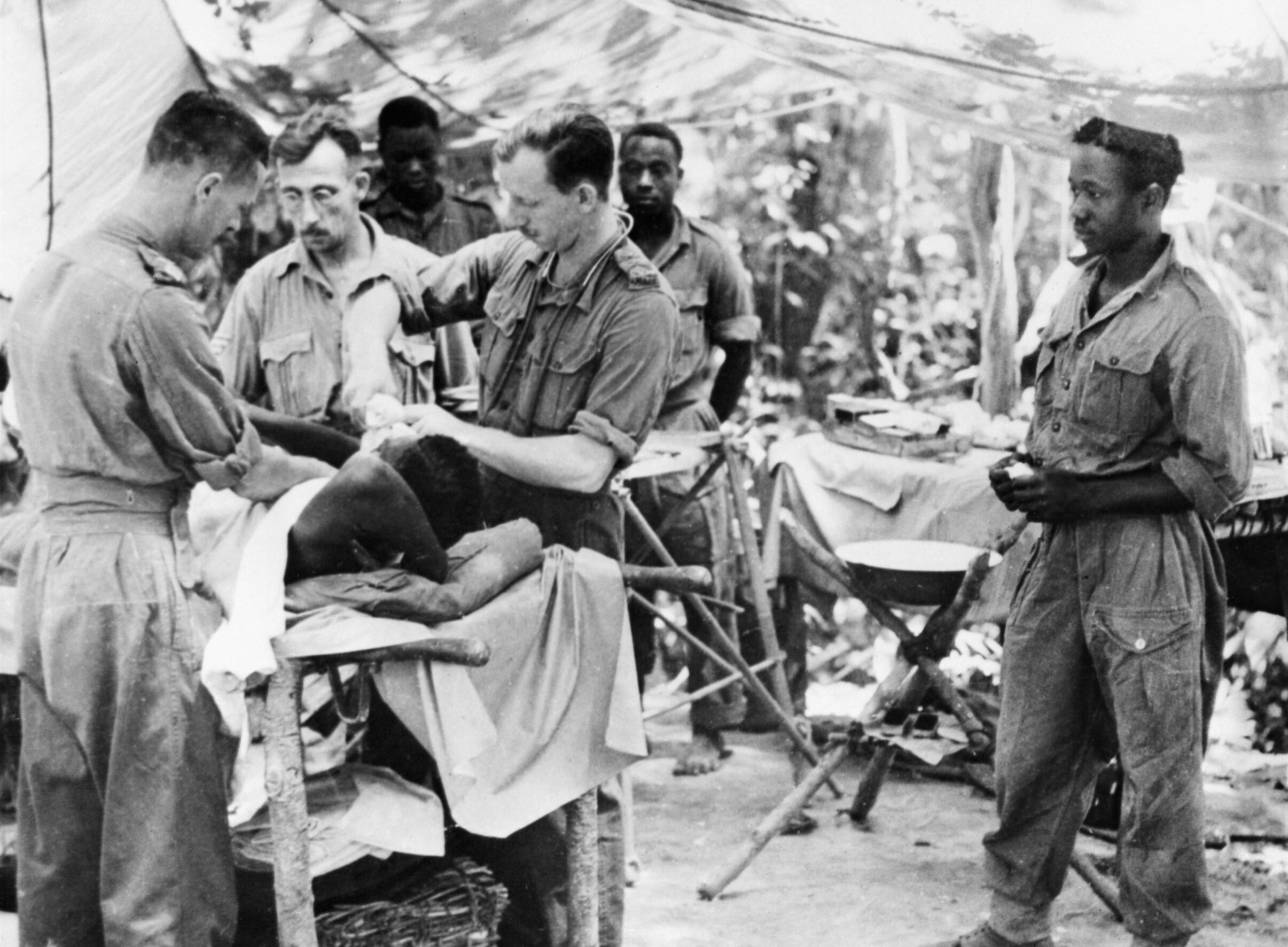
Doctors operating on some of the 81st Division's casualties in Burma, August 1944

The division was originally intended to operate on a pack basis, with porters carrying all equipment and supplies. Lieutenant General William Slim, then commanding XV Corps, commented on first inspecting units of the division in late 1943,

Their discipline and smartness were impressive, and they were more obviously at home in the jungle than any troops I had yet seen... I was at once struck by two things. First, by the horde of unarmed porters who were needed to carry supplies, ammunition, baggage and the heavier weapons, and secondly by the large number of white men in a unit, fifty or sixty to a battalion. Accustomed as I was to Indian battalions in the field with usually only seven or eight Europeans, it struck me as an unnecessarily generous supply.

== Order of Battle ==
General Officers Commanding

- Major General C G Woolner, from 3 March 1943
- Major General Frederick Joseph Loftus-Tottenham, from 3 August 1943 to 31 August 1945
  - except for
  - 15 to 26 August 1944, Brigadier E Collins
  - 31 January to 2 March 1945, Brigadier A Crook

=== Formation and North Arakan ===
From formation to reorganisation during September 1944. Infantry

- 3rd (West African) Infantry Brigade Group

Detached to Special Force on 8 November 1943

  - 6th Battalion, Nigeria Regiment
  - 7th Battalion, Nigeria Regiment
  - 12th Battalion, Nigeria Regiment
  - 1st (West African) Auxiliary Group (Nigeria Regiment) (Note: Composed of soldiers who acted as porters and pioneers. Numbering approximately 2,000 men organised into four companies ~550 were armed and acted as the unit's protection.)
  - 3rd (West African) Light Battery, West African Artillery (WAA)(left 14 May 1943)
  - 7th (West African) Field Company, West African Engineers (WAE)
  - 3rd (West African) Field Ambulance, West African Army Medical Corps (WAAMC)
  - 3rd (West African) Infantry Brigade Provost Section
  - details from West African Army Service Corps (WAASC)
- 5th (West African) Infantry Brigade Group

Reorganised as an infantry brigade on 31 August 1944.

  - 5th Battalion, Gold Coast Regiment
  - 7th Battalion, Gold Coast Regiment
  - 8th Battalion, Gold Coast Regiment
  - 3rd (West African) Auxiliary Group (Gold Coast Regiment)
  - 5th Light Battery, (WAA) (left 24 May 1944)
    - 2x Troops 3.7 inch mountain guns
    - 1 Troop 4 x 3 inch Mortars
  - 3rd Field Company, (WAE)
  - 4th Survey Section
  - 4th (West African) Field Butchery, (WAASC)
  - 5th (West African) Field Ambulance,(WAAMC)
  - 5th (West African) Field Hygiene Section, (WAAMC)
  - 5th (West African) Infantry Brigade Provost Section
- 6th (West African) Infantry Brigade Group

Reorganised as an infantry brigade on 31 August 1944.

  - 1st Battalion, Gambia Regiment
  - 1st Battalion, Sierra Leone Regiment
  - 4th Battalion, Nigeria Regiment
  - 4th (West African) Auxiliary Group (Sierra Leone Regiment)
  - 3rd Light Battery, (WAA) (left 24 May 1944)
    - 2x Troops 3.7 inch mountain guns
    - 1 Troop 4 x 3 inch Mortars
  - 6th Field Company, (WAE)
  - 3rd Survey Section
  - 6th (West African) Brigade Group Company, (WAASC)
  - 8th (West African) Field Butchery,(WAASC)
  - 6th (West African) Field Ambulance, (WAAMC)
  - 6th (West African) Field Hygiene Section, (WAAMC)
  - 6th (West African) Infantry Brigade Provost Section

Divisional Troops

- Artillery
  - 1st Light Anti-Aircraft/Anti-Tank Regiment, (WAA) (joined 6 May 1943)
  - 101st Light Regiment,(WAA) (formed 24 May 1944, formed from the 3rd, 5th and 6th Light Batteries 3.7 inch guns)
    - 3rd, 5th and 6th Light Batteries
  - 41st Mortar Regiment, (WAA) (formed 24 May 1944, formed from the mortar troops of the 3rd, 5th and 6th Light Batteries, and strengthened)
    - 101st, 102nd, 103rd Mortar Batteries (8 x 3 inch mortars)
- Reconnaissance
  - 81st (West African) Division Regiment, West African Armoured Corps (re-rolled on 1 January 1944, left February 1944, for XV Corps)
  - 11th (East African) Division Scouts (from 20 January 1944)
- Engineers
  - 3rd Field Company, (WAE)
- Bearers
  - 1st (West African) Auxiliary Group (Nigeria Regiment), from 17 January 1944
- Service Corps (West African Army Service Corps)
  - 81st (West African) Infantry Division Transport Regiment (WAASC)
  - 81st (West African) Infantry Division Troops Company Composite Platoon (WAASC)
  - 1st (West African) Field Butchery (WAASC)
- Division Troops
  - 81st (West African) Divisional Signals
  - Air Support Liaison Section
  - 26th Motor Ambulance Convoy
  - 5th Platoon, Burma Intelligence Corps
  - 16th Provost Section
  - 6th Field Security Section

=== Reorganisation and Arakan beaches ===
On reorganisation to a standard divisional establishment.

Infantry

- 5th (West African) Infantry Brigade

As a standard infantry brigade from 31 August 1944.

  - 5th Battalion, Gold Coast Regiment
  - 7th Battalion, Gold Coast Regiment
  - 8th Battalion, Gold Coast Regiment
  - 3rd (West African) Auxiliary Group (Gold Coast Regiment)
  - 5th (West African) Field Ambulance, (WAAMC)
  - 1780 Composite Platoon, (WAASC)
  - 1001st Detachment (West African) Mobile Workshops, West African Electrical and Mechanical Engineers (WAEME)
- 6th (West African) Infantry Brigade

As a standard infantry brigade from 31 August 1944.

  - 1st Battalion, Gambia Regiment
  - 1st Battalion, Sierra Leone Regiment
  - 4th Battalion, Nigeria Regiment
  - 4th (West African) Auxiliary Group (Sierra Leone Regiment)
  - 6th (West African) Field Ambulance, (WAAMC)
  - 1781 Composite Platoon, (WAASC)
  - 1002nd Detachment (West African) Mobile Workshops, (WAEME)

Divisional Troops

- Artillery
  - 1st Light Anti-Aircraft/Anti-Tank Regiment, (WAA) (reorganised as an anti-tank regiment on 1 October, renamed 22 October 1944)
  - 21st Anti-Tank Regiment, (WAA) renamed from the 1st Anti-Tank Regiment, (WAA)
  - 101st Light Regiment, (WAA)
    - 3rd, 5th and 6th Light Batteries
  - 41st Mortar Regiment, (WAA)
    - 101st, 102nd, 103rd Mortar Batteries (8 x 3 inch mortars)
- Reconnaissance
  - 81st (West African) Reconnaissance Regiment, West African Armoured Corps (organised as infantry)
  - 11th (East African) Division Scouts
- Engineers
  - 3rd Field Company, (WAE)
  - 5th Field Company, (WAE)
  - 6th Field Company, (WAE)
  - 8th Field Park Company, (WAE)
- Bearers
  - 1st (West African) Auxiliary Group (Nigeria Regiment)
- Division Troops
  - 81st (West African) Divisional Signals

== See also ==
- Military history of Nigeria during World War II
- The Gambia in World War II
- 82nd (West African) Division
- Seth Anthony, first non-European from Africa to gain the King's Commission

== Bibliography ==
- Luto, James (2013). Fighting with the Fourteenth Army in Burma. Pen and Sword Military. ISBN 978-1-78303-031-6.
