= RAF Jui =

RAF Jui was a military seaplane station operated from 1941 to 1945 by the Royal Air Force during World War II at Jui, a promontory of land between creeks running south from the Sierra Leone River, about 20 km east of Freetown in Sierra Leone.

It was the base for two squadrons of Consolidated Catalina seaplanes: one operated by No. 270 Squadron of the Royal Air Force and another by No. 490 Squadron of the Royal New Zealand Air Force. No. 270 Squadron was reformed at Jui on 12 November 1942 and operated there until July 1943, when it moved to RAF Apapa near Lagos in Nigeria. No. 490 Squadron RNZAF was formed at Jui on 28 March 1943 and, like No. 270 Squadron, flew operational sorties over the Atlantic searching for German submarines and shipping until the end of World War II. No. 204 Squadron of the RAF was based at RAF Jui from 28 January to 1 April 1944 flying Short Sunderland seaplanes. Several other squadrons had detachments at RAF Jui including No. 95 Squadron, No. 230 Squadron, No. 265 Squadron and No. 270 Squadron.

The Commanding Officer from 1941 until September 1944 was Group Captain Theodore Quintus Studd, DFC.

RAF Jui closed on 1 August 1945 when No. 490 Squadron was disbanded.
