= Military history of Nigeria during World War II =

Nigeria's history in World War II

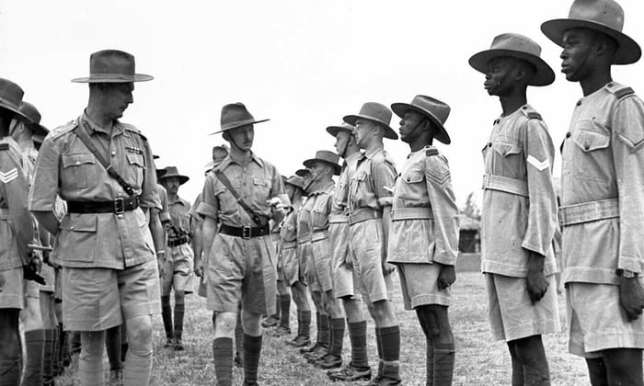
British officers inspecting Nigerian recruits

Nigeria participated in World War II as a British colony in September 1939, following the government's acceptance of the United Kingdom's declaration of war on Nazi Germany and entering the war on the side of the Allies. It was a key country in the African theatre, a critical part of the Allied strategy in Africa. In addition to its importance as a staging point in Africa, several Nigerian infantry regiments were raised to serve the British Empire in campaigns in Africa and Asia. 45,000 Nigerian soldiers served in the British Armed Forces in Africa and southeast Asia, and Nigerian regiments formed the majority of the 81st and 82nd West African Divisions of the British Army.

Nigerian soldiers fought in most notably Burma and India. Continuing pre-war policies, none of the commanding officers of the Nigerian corps were from Nigeria, but were selected from around the British Commonwealth until the first Nigerian officers were selected towards the war's end. Nigeria's involvement in the war fueled the struggle for independence from colonial rule, exposing them to ideas of self-determination and independence.

== Outbreak of war ==
Nigeria's entry was marked by a verbal agreement to join the Allied Forces in declaration of war against Germany. Nigeria accepted Britain's invitation to join the war almost unanimously. Influential Nigerian political leaders such as Nnamdi Azikiwe and Herbert Macaulay, hitherto critics of British colonial rule, appealed to all Nigerians to support the war effort. Within days of the declaration, the Nigerian War Relief Fund (NWRF) was established, a volunteer fundraising movement designed to increase local support for Britain. Initially, the war had significant popular support in Nigeria. While many soldiers signed up willingly, there were instances of conscription of Nigerian men, some as young as 16.

In response to critical manpower shortages following the invasion of Europe by Axis Powers, Britain and France began to look to their colonies for supplies of able-bodied fighting men. These men included combatants, military laborers and specialist units, and from 1942 onward, their role transformed from a defensive role in defending their empire in Africa, to an offensive role in repelling Japanese forces in the far eastern parts of the British Empire. The Home Office was aware that by sending colonial soldiers to Europe it would risk exposing them to radical political ideas which could eventually destabilize British rule in Africa, and African forces were therefore sent more commonly to South-East Asia.

== Combat deployments ==
=== East Africa ===
The first Nigerian units to see combat in the Second World War served in the British campaigns in East Africa. In 1940, the 1st (West Africa) Brigade was the first Nigerian unit to be deployed against the Axis Powers in Kenya. A total of 9,000 West African soldiers fought alongside regiments from the Gold Coast (present day Ghana), and the other British colonial possessions in West Africa. At this stage in the war, Nigeria's troop contributions were relatively small, and would not grow until the conclusion of the African campaigns of the war. Throughout the East African Campaigns, the Nigerian forces were organised at battalion level, and no whole divisions were created from Nigerian soldiers. Despite this, British officers reported being impressed with the capabilities of the Nigerian soldiers, of which their participation in the capture of Mogadishu and the rapid advance towards Degehabur can be highlighted.

For many Nigerian citizens, the invasion of Ethiopia four years before the outbreak of WWII was a wake-up call to the Axis threat. Therefore, as early as 1935, Nigerian efforts on the home front were concentrated on raising funds to support the war effort against Italy in Ethiopia.

=== Burma ===
After the success of the Allied campaigns in Africa, and with increasing need for soldiers to be deployed elsewhere, British command decided to form two divisions to fight in southeast Asia. The 81st Division was formed from West African brigades, then deployed in 1943. In 1944, the 82nd (West Africa) Division was formed, then sailed to British Ceylon (present day Sri Lanka) from the east coast of Africa. They then moved to Burma and took part in the third Arakan campaign in December 1944.

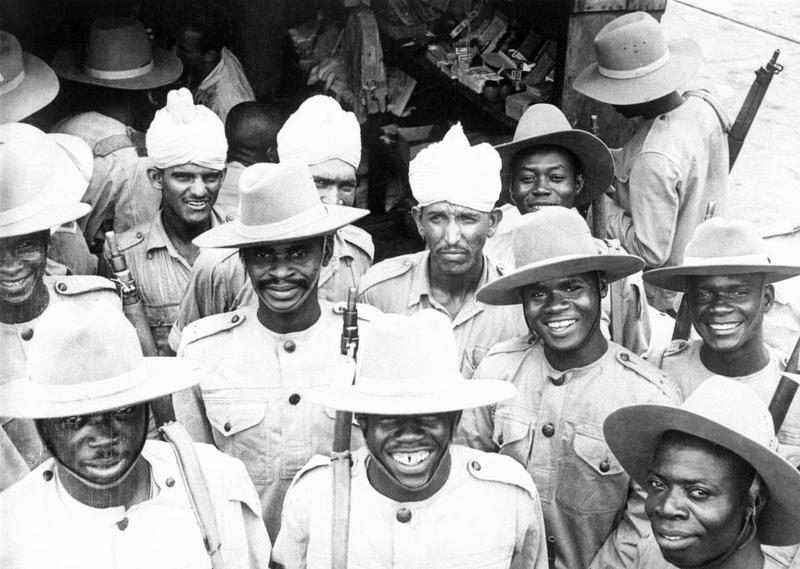
Indian soldiers mingle with men of the 81st West African Division after the latter had arrived in India for jungle training

The Allied forces in Burma faced a more experienced and entrenched Japanese Imperial force. Despite this, through use of aerial re-supply and effective use of the jungle terrain, the Allied forces were able to push the Japanese out of Burma. The jungle terrain forced the Allied forces to adopt new tactics and logistical strategies, a task which the Nigerian forces excelled at. The two West African divisions uniquely used non-combatant soldiers as porters, auxiliaries head-carrying supplies and ammunition. While British units used traditional resupply methods, the African porters enabled the West African divisions greater mobility than even the famed Chindit units native to Burma. The British units used their air-superiority to great effect throughout the campaign, with the RAF flying resupply missions which enabled the Allied forces to effectively fight in the jungles.

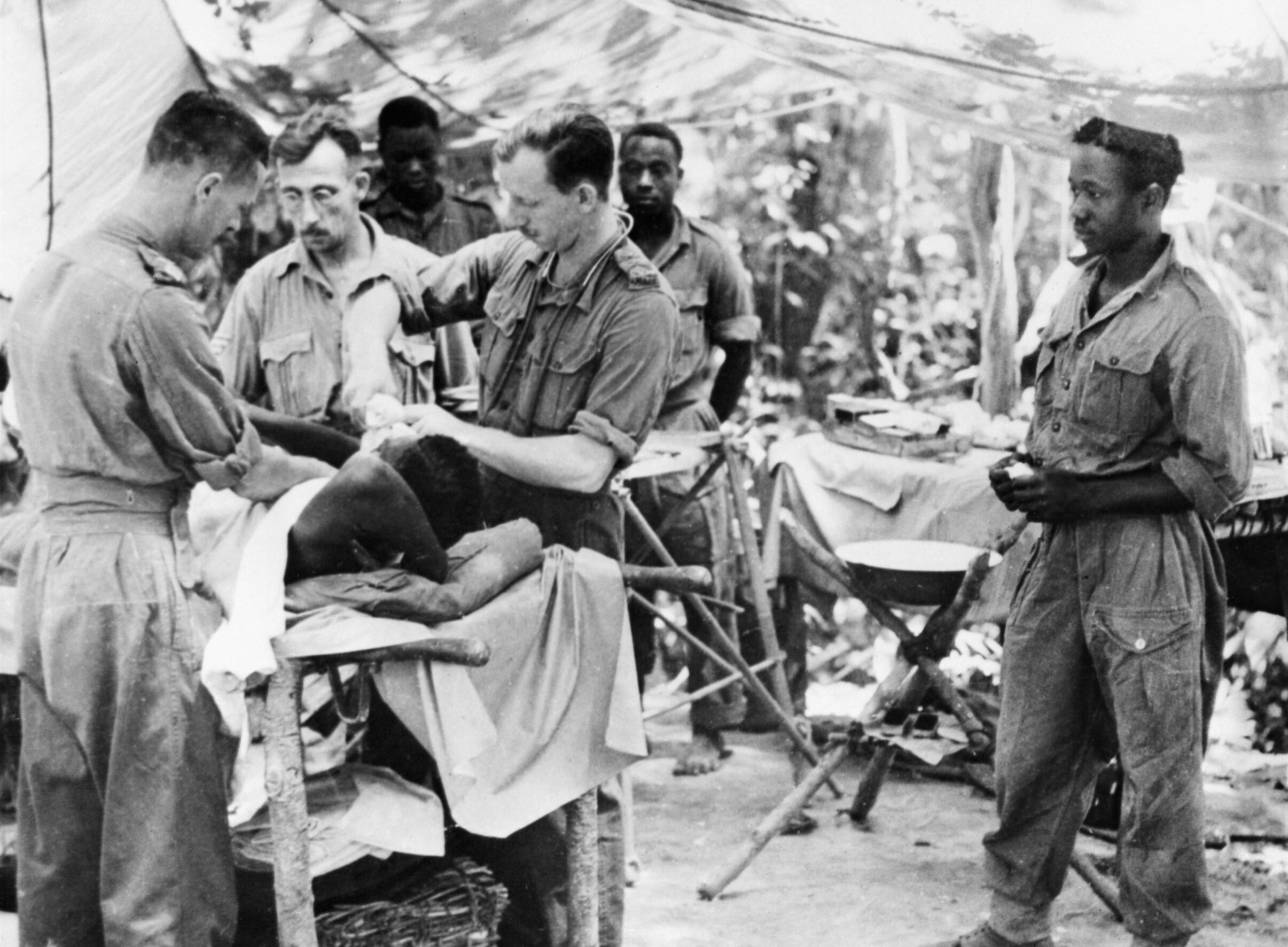
West African casualties in Burma, August 1944. Soldiers from the 81st (West Africa) Division had been injured in intense jungle conflict.

The 81st Division was initially deployed deep into the front, where it faced intense fighting for nearly a year before being relieved by the 82nd Division. By January 1945, the 82nd Division had reached Apuakwa on the Kaladan River, where they had been ordered to meet up with the 81st Division. From here the 81st Division was initially intended to return to India for rest and refit, and the 82nd Division was to take up the 81st Division's role of engaging Japanese elements.

The largest engagement of the campaign fought by Nigerian forces was the Battle of Myohaung, a swiftly executed operation to seize the town of Myohaung. Both Nigerian divisions were deployed to encircle the city, with the 81st Division due to return to India after the town's capture. After some fierce fighting on the outskirts of the city, the Japanese forces evacuated the city upon realizing they had been surrounded. The recapture of Myohaung was strategically important as the city lay on major supply routes for Japan.

Actions of the Allied combatants ultimately forced a Japanese evacuation of the Mayu (Myanmar) peninsula, capturing areas which had been held by Japan for nearly four years. British troops continued to advance along the Mayu peninsula until the Japanese conceded the area entirely. The involvement of Nigerian forces was critical for this campaign.

== Home front ==
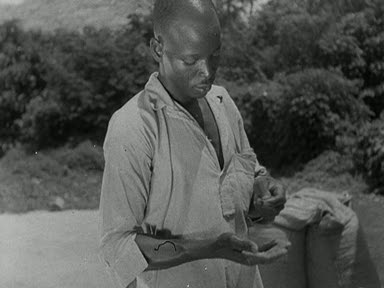
A Nigerian cocoa farmer in 1940

In preparation for the outbreak of a world war, the colonial government secretly developed several schemes to retain foreign exchange and ensure the supply of commodities necessary for a war effort. In 1939, as part of the plans the Nigerian colonial administration set up the Nigeria Supply Board to regulate trade and manage production. That year a series of "defense regulations" were instituted, granting vast power to the board and other administrators to control the distribution of imports and foodstuffs. In the early stages of the war, British commanders and colonial officials had not anticipated that Africa would be heavily involved in the conflict. After the rapid success of Germany's Blitzkrieg in Europe, the British government declared that winning the war would require a supreme effort from every person in the empire. Part of this effort would include increasing production of wartime commodities, meanwhile drastically reducing social spending, development, and imports of goods deemed non-essential. Additionally, direct taxes were increased on the population, a measure which would result in country-wide strikes in 1945 and 1947 against the continued enforcement of wartime legislation. Throughout the war, Nigerian attitudes towards colonial rule grew steadily more negative as the demands of the Nigerian War Relief Fund became harder to meet. The Home Office strongly encouraged and incentivised Nigerian miners and farmers to increase their output of raw materials. In particular, heavy demand was placed on rubber and coal.

Nigerian women played a critical role in collecting the harvests of Nigeria's two largest crop exports: cocoa and palm oil. Farmers were forced to produce these cash crops instead of food for the duration of the war due to economic difficulties. At the outbreak of war, the colonial government prohibited exports of cocoa and palm oil to Germany in order to deprive them of critical wartime goods. The government became the sole purchaser of all of Nigeria's cash crops, and lowered prices to cope with wartime demands. As a result, continuation of cocoa farming became highly difficult for small rural farmers, many of whom abandoned their farms due to sustained years of producing at a loss.

As in many places throughout WWII, Nigeria experienced an acute shortage of food from the years 1939–1945. Rationing was introduced and lasted as late as 1948 in some parts of the country. In order to procure basic items like salt, flour, butter or tinned milk a ration card was required. In addition to rationing, the government put restrictions on the movement of food within the country, for example: banning the movement of rice between Abeokuta and Lagos. Smugglers attempting to transport rice into Lagos were either fined or put on criminal trial for subverting the war effort.

Media was used to propagate support for the war throughout the country. Radio broadcasts were relayed throughout the country, broadcasting programming from the BBC and local broadcasters. Newspapers like The Yoruba News brought information of the progression of the war in the Yoruba language as well as English. In both of these cases, the media was produced primarily in English, with Yoruba publications emerging later in the war. The aims of these outlets was fundraising for the Nigeria War Relief Fund.

== After the war ==
Nigerian soldiers returning home after the war received little official congratulations for their involvement in the war. Upon successful completion of the Allied objectives in Burma, Nigerian troops were not included in the victory speech by commanding officer General William Slim. Upon their return to Nigeria, a general frustration with the colonial administration and a renewed sense of national pride contributed significantly to the pushes for independence in post-war Nigeria. Throughout the war, Nigerians had fought under European officers, and it was not until four years after the war's conclusion that the first Nigerian officer was commissioned, in 1949.

Combined with the tensions which had emerged on the home-front throughout the war, Nigeria pushed significantly for the principles of self-determination following the war. Like many nations following the end of WWII, wartime experiences inspired the population to campaign for independence. The Nigerian Civil War of 1966 was fought and organised by many veterans of the Second World War.

The general strike of 1945 has been credited as one of the defining moments in Nigerian history. The strike was orchestrated by trade unionists across the country and included delegates from the farming, railway, mining, manufacturing and teaching unions.

== See also ==
- East African campaign
- Western Desert campaign
- Burma campaign
