= 82nd (West Africa) Division =

British infantry division

82nd (West African) Division
- Formation sign of the 82nd (West African) Division.
- Active: 1941–1945
- Country: British West Africa
- Branch: Royal West African Frontier Force
- Type: Infantry
- Size: 15,000 personnel
- Engagements: Burma Campaign

Commanders
- Notable commanders: George McI. S. Bruce; Hugh Stockwell

The 82nd (West African) Division was formed under British control during the Second World War. It took part in the later stages of the Burma Campaign and was disbanded in Burma between May and September 1946.

== History ==
=== Formation ===
The inspiration for the division's formation came from General George Giffard. He had extensive experience of leading East African troops, and early in the Second World War became the commander of Britain's West Africa Command. He was eager for troops from Britain's African colonies to play their part in the war. When he was subsequently appointed to command the Eastern Army in India, facing the Imperial Japanese Army on the frontier between India and Burma, he requested that the two divisions being organised in West Africa be used in the Burma campaign.

The division was formed from the 1st (West African) Infantry Brigade and 2nd (West African) Infantry Brigade, both of which had taken part in the East African Campaign in 1940 and 1941, and the new 4th (Nigerian) Infantry Brigade. The Division's headquarters was created on 1 August 1943. It followed the 81st (West African) Division in the numbering sequence of British war-raised infantry divisions. The HQ took control of its sub-units on 1 November 1943. The division's formation sign was crossed spears on a porter's headband, in black (sometimes white) on a yellow shield.

=== Burma campaign ===
On 20 May 1944, the division sailed for Ceylon, where the division was assembled on 20 July. In August the organisation was slightly changed, with supporting arms which had previously been distributed between the brigades being controlled centrally by the division HQ. The division was organised on a "head load" basis, with porters carrying all heavy equipment and supplies. Although many of the troops were from the savannah of northern Ghana and Nigeria, they were well-trained and effective when operating in jungle and mountains.

After further training, the division took part in the third Arakan campaign in December 1944 under XV Indian Corps. On 15 December the Division captured Buthidaung on the Kalapanzin River and created a bridgehead on the east bank of the river. This allowed allied troops to control the Maungdaw–Buthidaung road which had been contested for three years and enabled the transport of 650 river craft by road through railway tunnels to Buthidaung to supply Indian troops in the Mayu Range.

The 82nd (West African) Division (supported by 28th Anti-tank Regiment RIA and 33rd Mountain Artillery Regiment RIA) then crossed a steep and jungle-covered mountain range to converge with the British 81st (West African) Division on Myohaung near the mouth of the Kaladan River. This move forced the Japanese to evacuate the Mayu peninsula which they had held for almost four years and retreat south along the coast. As they retreated, troops from the 3rd Commando Brigade and units of the 25th Indian Infantry Division landed in inlets and chaungs ahead of them. Caught between the troops landing from the sea and the 82nd (West African) Division, the Japanese suffered many casualties.

At this point, air supply was withdrawn from the Arakan front to allow the transport aircraft to supply the Allied forces in Central Burma. The 82nd (West African) Division's carrier battalions carried all supplies and equipment for the division from this point. The Japanese 54th Division holding the Arakan was divided into two detachments holding the roads across the Arakan Hills leading from An and Taungup. The 82nd (West African) Division was asked to cross the Dalet Chaung and hilly terrain to approach the An Pass from the north west, while being supplied by air. The 1st and 4th (Nigerian) Brigades suffered many casualties in opening the routes to Kaw and Kyweguseik in late February. The 4th (Nigerian) Brigade even lost two of its commanding officers. By March, the division captured Dalet Chaung and the strategic supply base of Tamandu, in coordination with Indian units.

The 2nd (Gold Coast) Brigade based at Letmauk subsequently became the target of intense Japanese counter-attacks, suffering many casualties. They were forced to withdraw, covered by the 1st (Nigerian) Brigade. By sending long distance fighting patrols to harass the Japanese flanks, the Nigerian unit was able to force a Japanese retreat and retake An on 13 May 1945. The main body of the division, with the 22nd (East African) Brigade under command, advanced south from Tamandu. By the end of May Kindaungyyi, Taungup and Sandoway had been captured. Campaigning ceased during the monsoon rains and the war ended a few weeks later.

== Memorials ==
During the third Arakan campaign, the 82nd Division suffered 2,085 casualties, the highest of any unit in XV Corps. Some of those killed were buried in jungle tracts, but many Nigerian graves remain in cemeteries at the Dalet Chaung near Tamandu and the Taukkyan War Cemetery. Others are remembered at the War Memorial in Rangoon. Other commemorations of the division's (and its component formations') service are the names of Dodan, An, Myohaung, Arakan and Marda Barracks in Lagos, Letmauk Barracks in Ibadan, Dalet, Mogadishu, Colito and Kalapanzin Barracks in Kaduna, the Chindit Barracks in Zaria, Arakan Barracks in Accra and Myohaung Barracks in Takoradi.

== Order of Battle ==
General Officer Commanding : Major General George McIlree Stanton Bruce (replaced due to illness by Major General Hugh Charles Stockwell 12 January 1945)

=== On formation ===
The division's brigades were originally organised as infantry brigade groups.

==== 1st (West Africa) Infantry Brigade ====
- 1st Battalion, Nigeria Regiment
- 2nd Battalion, Nigeria Regiment
- 3rd Battalion, Nigeria Regiment
- 5th (West Africa) Auxiliary Group (Note: Composed of soldiers who acted as porters and pioneers. Numbering approximately 2,000 men organised into four companies ~500 were armed and acted as the unit's protection.)
- 1st (West Africa) Light Battery, West African Artillery (WAA)
  - 2x Troops 3.7 inch mountain guns
  - 1 Troop 4 x 3 inch Mortars
- 1st (West Africa) Field Company, West African Engineers (WAE)
- 1st (West Africa) Field Ambulance, West African Army Medical Corps (WAAMC)
- details West Africa Army Service Corps (WAASC)
- 1st (West Africa) Infantry Brigade Provost Section

==== 2nd (West Africa) Infantry Brigade ====
- 1st Battalion, Gold Coast Regiment
- 2nd Battalion, Gold Coast Regiment
- 3rd Battalion, Gold Coast Regiment
- 6th (West Africa) Auxiliary Group, Gold Coast Regiment
- 2nd (West Africa) Light Battery, (WAA)
  - 2x Troops 3.7 inch mountain guns
  - 1 Troop 4 x 3 inch Mortars
- 2nd (West Africa) Field Company,(WAE)
- 2nd (West Africa) Field Ambulance, (WAAMC)
- details (WAASC)
- 2nd (West Africa) Infantry Brigade Provost Section

==== 4th (West Africa) Infantry Brigade ====
- 5th Battalion, Nigeria Regiment
- 9th Battalion, Nigeria Regiment
- 10th Battalion, Nigeria Regiment
- 2nd (West Africa) Auxiliary Group
- 4th (West Africa) Light Battery, (WAA)
  - 2x Troops 3.7 inch mountain guns
  - 1 Troop 4 x 3 inch Mortars
- 4th (West Africa) Field Company, (WAE)
- 4th (West Africa) Field Ambulance, (WAAMC)
- details (WAASC)
- 4th (West Africa) Infantry Brigade Provost Section

==== Division Troops ====
- Artillery
  - 2nd Light Anti-Aircraft/Anti-Tank Regiment, (WAA) (joined 12 December 1943)
  - 102nd Light Regiment (WWA) (formed 1 July 1944 from the 1st 2nd and 4th Light Batteries 3.7 inch guns)
    - 1st 2nd and 4th Light Batteries
  - 42nd Mortar Regiment, (WAA) (formed 1 August 1944, formed from the mortar troops of the 1st 2nd and 4th Light Batteries)
- Reconnaissance
  - 81st (West African) Division Regiment, West African Armoured Corps (reconnaissance)
- Engineers
  - 1st Field Company, (WAE) (from 1st (WA) Brigade 22 August 1944)
  - 2nd Field Company, (WAE) (from 2nd (WA) Brigade 1 August 1944)
  - 4th Field Company, (WAE) (from 4th (WA) Brigade 1 August 1944)
  - 9th Field Park Company, (WAE)
- Bearers
  - 7th (West African) Auxiliary Group
- Division Troops
  - 81st (West African) Divisional Signals

=== On Reorganisation ===
in October 1944 the division was reorganised as a standard division, (not as brigade groups).

==== 1st (West Africa) Infantry Brigade ====
- 1st Battalion, Nigeria Regiment
- 2nd Battalion, Nigeria Regiment
- 3rd Battalion, Nigeria Regiment
- 5th (West Africa) Auxiliary Group

==== 2nd (West Africa) Infantry Brigade ====
- 1st Battalion, Gold Coast Regiment
- 2nd Battalion, Gold Coast Regiment
- 3rd Battalion, Gold Coast Regiment
- 6th (West Africa) Auxiliary Group, Gold Coast Regiment

==== 4th (West Africa) Infantry Brigade ====
- 5th Battalion, Nigeria Regiment
- 9th Battalion, Nigeria Regiment
- 10th Battalion, Nigeria Regiment
- 2nd (West Africa) Auxiliary Group

==== Divisional Units ====
- Artillery
  - 102nd Light Regiment, (WAA)
    - 1st, 2nd, 4th Light Batteries
  - 42nd Mortar Regiment, (WAA)
  - 22nd Anti-Tank Regiment, West African Artillery
- Engineers
  - 1st Field Company, West African Engineers
  - 2nd Field Company, West African Engineers
  - 4th Field Company, West African Engineers
  - 9th Field Park Company, West African Engineers
- Bearers
  - 7th (West African) Auxiliary Group
- Service Corps (WAASC)
  - 82nd (West African) Infantry Division Transport Regiment
    - 825th and 836th Divisional Transport Company, (WAASC)
  - 1784th, 1785th, 1786th, 1787th Composite Platoons (WAASC)
  - 26th and 29th Field Butchery Sections, (WAASC)
- West African Army Medical Corps (WAAMC)
  - 1st (West Africa) Field Ambulance, WAAMC
  - 2nd (West Africa) Field Ambulance, WAAMC
  - 4th (West Africa) Field Ambulance, WAAMC
  - 82nd (West Africa) Field Hygiene Section, WAAMC
- West African Electrical & Mechanical Engineers (WAEME)
  - 1003rd, 1004th and 1005th Mobile Workshops, WAEME
  - 1016th - 1022nd Light Aid Detachments, WAEME
- Division Troops
  - 81st (West African) Divisional Signals
  - 82nd (West Africa) Divisional Postal Unit
  - 119th Field Cash Office, West African Army Pay Corps
  - 82nd Field Security Section
  - 276th Divisional Provost Company

== See also ==
- Military history of Nigeria during World War II
- 81st (West African) Division

== Bibliography ==
- Luto, James (2013). Fighting with the Fourteenth Army in Burma. Pen and Sword Military. pp. 204–218. ISBN 978-1-78303-031-6.
- Cole, Howard (1973). Formation Badges of World War 2. British Commonwealth and Empire. Arms and Armour Press.
