= Adunni Oluwole =

Personal details
- Born: 1905 Ibadan, Oyo State
- Died: 1957 (aged 51–52)
- Party: Nigerian Commoners Liberal Party
- Education: St. John's School, Aroloya, Lagos State

Adunni Oluwole (1905-1957), also known as Olaniwun Adunni Oluwole, was a Nigerian pre-independence politician who became the first Nigerian female political leader, and a human rights activist who opposed independence. She was an itinerant preacher whose public speaking talent made her known.

== Early life and education ==
Adunni Oluwole was born in Ibadan in 1905 to a family of an Ibadan warrior. After family squabbles, her mother moved her and her siblings to Aroloya, Lagos, where they lived close to St. John's church. Adolphus Howells, the Vicar, contributed to the family's development while they remained in the area. She lived with Howells, who enrolled her in St. John's School, Aroloya. She however returned to her mother after her primary education.

From 1925 to 1932, Oluwole took part in leadership and dramatic roles in St. John's church. As a youth, she wrote a play for the Girl's Guild which was directed by the nationalist Herbert Macaulay. She went on to establish professional theater in Western Nigeria. She and Fumilayo Ransome-kuti became the first female to own theatre when the role was majorly dominated by men.

She later on, became an itinerant preacher. She vehemently opposed bringing dead bodies into the church for funerals, claiming to have seen a vision from God saying that He was God of the living not the dead. Her public speaking prowess gained her a vast audience and increased her popularity.

== Political career ==
Adunni's political journey emerged during the 1945 Nigerian general strike where she was moved by the plight of the workers during the 44-day labour strike, she supported the movement by giving words of encouragements, organized and mobilized women and contributed monetary donations. She donated the sum of one hundred pounds (200.00) to relieve the suffering of the workers. it was for this great cause she was known to be the mother of workers.

In 1954, she became the founder and president of the Nigerian Commoners Liberal Party (NCLP) and the party won the regional house of representative seat, five months of its formation against the NCNC and Action Group (AG) Party in Osun North Central (Ikirun). The majority of the members of NCLP were men. One of the party's objectives is to eradicate corrupt politicians among members of prominent political parties.

She was an anti-independence activist who vehemently opposed the vote for independence when a date was first proposed in 1956. Her reasons were that the politicians who were given power abused it and were simply African colonialists. Her message resonated with the rural people and they came to be known among Yoruba-speaking groups as "Egbe Koyinbo Mailo" which translates to "The White Man Must Not Go". The party was short-lived as it had to be shut down due to low funding.

In 1955, she went before the Olubadan in Ibadan to air her political views, but she was shut down by Adegoke Adelabu who called her a harlot and threatened to hit her with broomsticks. She was later banished from Ibadan and relocated to Akure where she continued to spread her anti-independence message.

She was seen as a legend and female leader who advocated for women's rights as she continuously demanded women's participation in politics in constitutional conferences. She showcased the equality of women to the men by actions.
