= Gambia Regiment =

British Colonial Auxiliary Forces regiment (1901–1958)

The Gambia Regiment
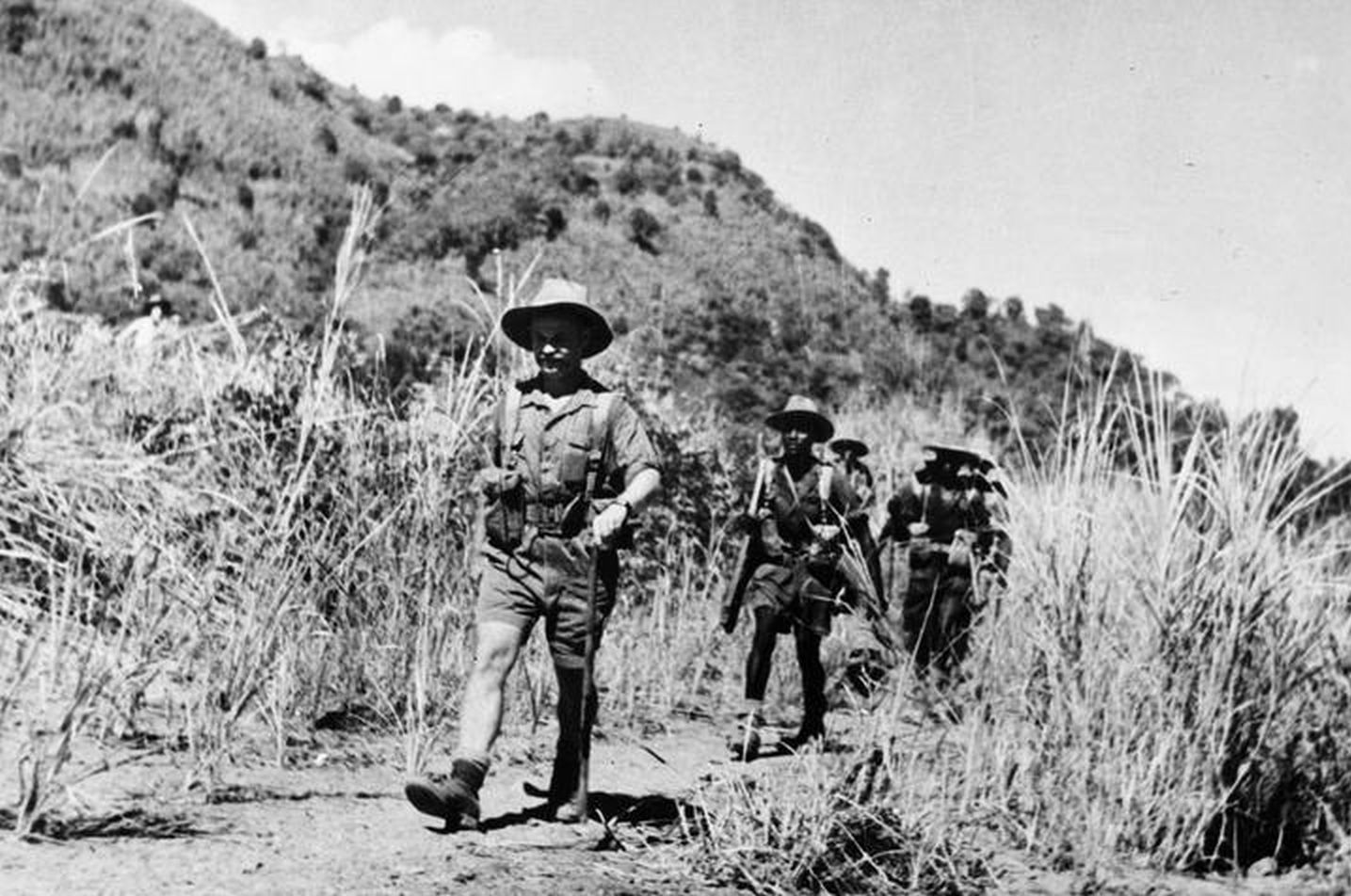
- A Gambia Regiment patrol during the Third Arakan Campaign, January 1945.
- Active: 1901—1958
- Country: (The Gambia) Gambia Colony and Protectorate
- Allegiance: United Kingdom
- Branch: British Colonial Auxiliary Forces
- Type: Infantry
- Role: Infantry (wartime); Garrison troops (peacetime)
- Part of: Royal West African Frontier Force (1901–1958); 81st (West Africa) Division (1943–1945)
- Garrison/HQ: Bathurst, The Gambia
- Battle honours: Cameroons, 1914–1916; Nyangao; East Africa, 1916–1918; North Arakan; Kaladan; Mowdok; Nyohaung; Burma, 1943–1945

Commanders
- Notable commanders: Antony Read

The Gambia Regiment was a British Colonial Auxiliary Forces regiment raised in the Gambia Colony and Protectorate that existed between 1901 and 1958. Known as the Gambia Company from 1901 to 1939 and from 1945 to 1950, its strength fluctuated from peacetime and wartime, peaking at two battalions during World War II. The unit saw active service in both world wars, participating in the Kamerun and East African campaigns during World War I and in the Burma campaign during World War II. It was organisationally part of the larger Royal West African Frontier Force, and was part of the 81st (West Africa) Division in World War II.

== Early history ==
Throughout 1900 and 1901, the Gambia had experienced an insurgency against British colonial rule, which was eventually suppressed by a military expedition, known as the Gambia Field Force, under Lieutenant Colonel H. E. Brake. It consisted of soldiers from the West India Regiment and the Central Africa Regiment. With the West African Frontier Force (WAFF) being founded in 1898, the Colonial Office made the decision to raise a company in The Gambia, initially to be part of the Sierra Leone Battalion. Captain F. O. Graham of the Royal Marines oversaw its creation, with it formally being founded on 30 November 1901. Lieutenant Hoskyns of the Lincolnshire Regiment and Sergeant Noble of the Coldstream Guards, along with Graham, recruited a group of 75 Mendes from Sierra Leone to form part of the company. Lieutenant Morley of the Manchester Regiment and Colour Sergeant Wheatcroft of the Worcester Regiment oversaw the training of the Gambian native recruits.

By 2 February 1902, the company had reached its full strength of 120 men. One quarter were native Gambians with the remaining number being from Sierra Leone. In April, the Inspector General inspected the company, and it was reported on very creditably. On 16 April, a detachment of the company under Graham, escorted the Governor to punish some native Gambians in Bita Village, a Jola settlement in (Foni Bintang Karanai) District. During this period, Captain E. H. Hopkinson served as the Medical Officer. Later in 1902, the company was formally separated from the Sierra Leone Battalion. Throughout the following years, the initial Mende recruits were replaced with recruits from local tribes, primarily being Mandinka or Jollof, but also some Fula and Bambara.

In 1906, Captain Hastings of the Manchester Regiment replaced Graham as the company's commanding officer, and Lieutenant Heeles of the Royal Field Artillery replaced Morley. 1907 saw the company issued with SMLE (Lee-Enfield) rifles to replace their carbines. In March 1908, Captain R. D. F. Oldman succeeded Hastings as commander of the company, with Lieutenants Hasketh-Smith and J. A. Savage of the Northamptonshire Regiment joined the company in July. In January 1910, Lieutenant F. V. Manger of the Durham Light Infantry replaced Hasketh-Smith. In September that year, Captain H. T. Dobbin of the Duke of Cornwall's Light Infantry took over command from Oldman, with Captain V. B. Thurston of the Dorset Regiment replacing Savage and Freman of the Royal Artillery taking Manger's place.

== First World War ==
At the outbreak of World War I, the Gambia Company had the strength of around 130 soldiers. Hamilton described it as "possibly the Empire's smallest 'regiment'." In September 1914, the signallers were dispatched to take part in the Kamerun campaign. Half the company under Captain V. B. Thurston was dispatched in January 1915, and the other half under H. G. V. M. Freeman was dispatched in September 1915. This left the Gambia Constabulary to garrison the colony.

The detachment from the company formed part of Haywood's column in April 1915, to serve as a preliminary to the Allied advance on Yaoundé. During the 3 May attack on heavily entrenched positions at Wumbiagas, Lieutenant K. Markham-Rose of the Gambia Company was killed. Company Sergeant Major Ebrima Jalu won the African Distinguished Conduct Medal (DCM) for his actions during the battle. During fighting around the village of Ngog later in the campaign, The Gambia Company's Lieutenant A. E. Coombs was wounded and later Mentioned in Dispatches (MiD). During later stages of fighting, two other Gambian soldiers, Private Saljen Sidibi and Sergeant Sambah Bah were awarded the DCM. They were also mentioned in dispatches, as was Captain Thurston.

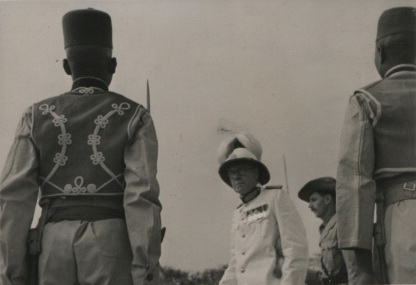
Sir Hilary Blood, Governor of the Gambia, inspecting a guard of honour provided by Gambia Regiment soldiers, c. 1940s.

In December 1916, the Gambia Company formed part of the Nigerian Brigade that was dispatched to German East Africa. In August 1917, the company moved with the brigade up to Kilwa Kisiwani, and in September the brigade advanced on the western flank of the main British force. Prior to the Battle of Mahiwa from 15 to 17 October 1917, the company had been dispatched 4 miles (6.4 km) to the south-east to Nyangao, to intercept a possible German retreat. The Gambian column, which included a detachment from the Nigerian Battery, came under heavy opposition, but set up perimeter defences to block the route. The next day, however, it was asked to return to Mahiwa to reinforce the main brigade. Realising that the brigade had become surrounded, Roberts, the commander of the Gambian column, took control of the forces of 1 Battalion, Nigerian Regiment, which were in disarray. They formed a front against the German attack, with half of the Gambia Company spread among them, and the other half of the company sent to defend the Nigerian guns.

The greatest intensity of the German attacks was on the force's right flank, with the half of the Gambia Company protecting the guns heavily outnumbered. After sustaining severe casualties, it was forced to retreat. Eventually, Roberts' force withdrew to Nahumpa Mission. Two drafts reinforced the Gambia Company over the course of the East Africa campaign. On 8 April 1918, the company returned to Bathurst, and in November a review was held to celebrate the Armistice. In December, the Governor presented the following medals to members of the company: the DCM to Company Sergeant Major Saisey, Corporal George Thomas, and Corporal Dembah Krubali; the African Meritorious Service Medal to Interpreter Karifa Dembeli. On 1 June 1919, Captain H. T. C. Strange took over command from Law. The Gambia Memorial in Banjul contains the names of nine Gambian soldiers who died during World War I.

== Interwar years ==
Following the end of World War One, the unit retained its single company strength. The Army Council issued an instruction in 1920 calling for more officers for the Royal West African Frontier Force, including for the Gambia Company. The requirements were that the candidates should be older than 22, officers of the regular army or reserves, and unmarried on taking the appointment. The West African Frontier Force (WAFF) received royal patronage in 1928, becoming the Royal West African Frontier Force (RWAFF). In 1935, with increasing tension in Africa, it was decided to retain the Gambia Company for local defence. It was then decided that it should raise an additional reserve company. In 1937, the company won the Africa Cup of the Army Rifle Association, the first time it had been one by a RWAFF unit that was not from the Nigeria Regiment. In 1940, mention was first made of a Gambia Regiment FC that played against other local association football teams.

== Second World War ==
As the rise of fascism in Europe was witnessed during the 1930s, and particularly following the Second Italo-Ethiopian War, plans were put in place to provide an RWAFF expeditionary force of two brigades in the event of war. When war broke out, these plans were put into effect, and eventually 28 battalions were formed, alongside light batteries, AA batteries, and all the arms and services which are required to form a brigade. The Gambia was under particular threat as it was completely surrounded by Vichy French territory. The Gambia Company was raised to the strength of a battalion in early 1940, and renamed as the Gambia Regiment. In 1941, a second battalion was formed that remained on the home front for the duration of the war. It was claimed that the two battalions enlisted in the Gambia was the highest proportion of the four British colonies in West Africa.

=== Advance into Kaladan Valley, January–March 1944 ===
Patch of the 81st (West Africa) Division, to which the 1st Battalion, Gambia Regiment was attached.

In January 1944, 1st Battalion, Gambia Regiment, formed a key part of the advance into Kaladan Valley in Burma. The battalion moved on the left of the British force, following a "jeepable" track that allowed the Brigade headquarters to follow, all the way to Paletwa. The battalion met light resistance at Murgai from Japanese forces, but swiftly dealt with them. The final bound to Milawa-Sepawaung was completed on 22 January, firstly by the Gambia Regiment and later in the day by 4th Battalion, Nigeria Regiment. Patrols found Paletwa clear of enemy, but when the advance on the town began on the 24 January, Japanese were found to be well dug-in on two hills that mutually supported each other. The plan of attack was for the Nigerians to surround the position and then attack with a company from the north west, with artillery support from the 3rd Light Battery and the mortars of the Gambia and Sierra Leone regiments. The east flank was to be watched by the Sierra Leone Regiment and the Gambia Regiment was put in brigade reserve. The attack failed, but patrols the next day found that the Japanese had evacuated their positions.

After moving up, reports reached the brigade that the enemy was concentrated on the Kreinggyaung-Bidonegyaungwa-Kaladan line. By this time, the 5th (West Africa) Infantry Brigade was moving through the valley to support the 6th Brigade. On 4 February, the Japanese launched their counter-attack. The Gambia Regiment was positioned 3 miles (4.8 km) north of Kaladan Village on the west bank of the river. On 6 February, the Gambia Regiment, slowly advancing on Kaladan Village, found that the Japanese were strongly entrenched in a commanding position. The next day, they launched an attack but the dense jungle meant co-operation was difficult and no progress was made. On 10 February, all three light batteries had arrived to support the battalion, and with fire support another attack was launched, which resulted in a small advance. The day after, another attack was made, but again failed. By this time discouraged, no further progress was made by the battalion until 15 February, when patrols found the Japanese had vacated its positions, having left in boats overnight.

By 19 February, the battalion had moved to attempt to establish a bridgehead across the Pi Chaun river at its confluence with the Kaladan. It was facing stiff opposition, but needed to do this on order to come in on the rear of the Japanese forces that were holding up the advance of the 5th Brigade. On 23 February, the battalion succeeded in crossing the Pi Chaun at Walagan, and by 24 February the whole of Taungdaun and Kyauktaw were in British hands. The Gambia Regiment was then put in reserve as the 6th Brigade advanced, but on 1–2 March evidence emerged of a Japanese counter-offensive, as the Scout Battalion was pushed back to Pagoda Hill. The Gambia Regiment was dispatched to hold the hill at all costs, and the Division's orders were changed from a further advance to holding the ground they already had.

The battalion was in position on the hill on 2 March, but were disadvantaged by having its companies dispersed so far apart. The Japanese were able to infiltrate the Gambian positions during the night and on dawn on 3 March, they attacked. Control broke down in the battalion, and, unable to take effective action, was overwhelmed by the Japanese and forced to retreat. A "gallant defence" was put up by members of the battalion, but to no avail. Though the 1st Battalion, Sierra Leone Regiment had broken through to reinforce the Gambians, and though the Scout Battalion and Gambia Regiment were regrouping near Pagoda Hill, divisional command made the decision not to attempt to retake the hill.

=== Retreat from Kaladan, April–May 1944 ===
As the retreat from Kaladan Valley was underway, it was decided to move the 81st (WA) Division across to the Kalapanzin River to strike in its flank any large scale move by Japanese forces towards Taung. The two units remaining in Kaladan were the Gambia Regiment and the 7th Battalion, 16th Punjab Regiment, together forming Hubforce. During the retreat, the Japanese established themselves on the jeep track south of Mizawa, where they were attacked by the Gambia Regiment on 5 April. A second attack the next day with the Sierra Leone Regiment and supported by artillery successfully dislodged them. Attempting to withdraw during the night of the 7–8 April, they were cut off by a platoon of the Gambia Regiment, who fought them for four hours in the dark. The enemy in these actions was identified as 3rd Battalion, 111th Regiment, who had previously suffered heavily at Pagoda Hill and at other actions. They were estimated to be down to around 1/5th their original strength.

Two days after the rest of the division had left, Hubforce was able to maintain its positions at Kaladan Village. However, fearing encirclement, a retreat was commenced on 13 April, with the Punjabis falling back to Naiwa. On 17 April, the Japanese attacked the Punjabis at Naiwa, causing them to fall back through Paletwa, held by the Gambia Regiment, to Dokhan, 12 miles (19 km) to its north. With enemy pressure increasing, the Gambia Regiment fell back on 23 April through Dokhan to a position covering Daletme. It was decided not to hold the Satpaung-Daletme area, and so the Gambia Regiment took up a position on a ridge 4 miles (6.4 km) east of Labawa on 1 May. Two days later, the Punjabis fell back through the Gambia Regiment to Labawa, and on 7 May the Gambians fell back to a position 3,000 yards north-east of Mowdok, afterwards known as Frontier Hill. During this, 1st Tripura Rifles - a lightly armed state unit who had been watching the Pi Chaun, the route the Japanese were advancing down - withdrew towards Labawa followed closely by the enemy.

The Japanese, having been reinforced, attacked the Labawa position. As there was a danger of them penetrating between the Gambians and the Punjabis, the Punjabis withdrew to a position in the Mowdok area. On 16 May, the Gambians were attacked and the Japanese pressed on their positions throughout 17 May. On 20 May, the Gambia Regiment was relieved by the Punjabis and they moved back to a position covering Mowdok. The XV Corps ordered the rest of 6th Brigade, besides 4th Battalion, Nigeria Regiment, from Taung to Chiringa with the objective of taking control of the Mowdok area. While the 6th Brigade struggled in the rain to reach Mowdok, the Japanese launched their most determined attack on the Punjabis holding Frontier Hill north-east of Mowdok. A counterattack by the Gambia Regiment made little progress, and on the following day the Japanese offensive was renewed.

On 25 May, the commanding officer of Hubforce decided to concentrate around Mowdok, and on 26 May the force was set-up as follows: 1st Battalion, Gambia Regiment on the north; 1st Tripura Rifles on the south and west; 7th Battalion, 16th Punjab Regiment on the east. The headquarters of 6th Brigade reached Tranchi by boat on 1 June, but three days heavy rain prevented all movement. The brigade commander managed to get through and assumed command, and two companies of 1st Battalion, Sierra Leone Regiment arrived on 5 June. The next day, all troops were ordered to withdraw except 1st Tripura Rifles, with the Punjabis retreating to Tranchi on 7 June, followed in the next two days by the Gambians and Sierra Leoneans. On 11 June, the Japanese attacked and captured Mowdok, though the Tripura Rifles set fire to the stores before falling back to Kumai. The movement of 6th Brigade was halted at once and the Gambia Regiment was sent to establish a position at the junction of the Sangu River and the Remanki Chaung, 7 miles (11 km) north of Singpa, which the Tripura Rifles were sent to patrol.

=== Retaking of Kaladan ===
The Gambia Regiment continued to play a role through the re-taking of Kaladan Valley from Japanese forced. In November 1944, the 81st (West Africa) Division began to move down Kaladan Valley, and on 3 December reached Kaladan Village. The Arakan offensive began on 14 December, with the division taking Thandada on 24 December. On 24 January, the division forced the Japanese from Myohaung, and by May all West African operations in Burma were completed. The Japanese were defeated in Burma in August, before their overall surrender in September 1945.

== Post-war and disbandment ==
Following the end of the Second World War, in 1945 the two battalions of the Gambia Regiment were demobilised and selected elements were combined to form a single company again. This was called 'G' Company, and officially formed part of the Sierra Leone Battalion. The Cape St Mary's Barracks in the Gambia became known as Frontier Hill as a tribute to the May 1944 fighting around Mowdok. On 10 February 1950, the Gambia Regiment was reconstituted as a separate entity, but to be maintained in peacetime at the strength of one company, known as 'A' Company. In April 1951, colours were presented to the regiment. In January 1957, the colony received Prince Philip, Duke of Edinburgh, and, despite their limited resources, "carried out the necessary ceremonial and hospitality with commendable skill."

In 1953, the British held a Conference on West African Forces in Lagos, Nigeria. This conference resolved "to provide for an increasing flow of African officers into the West African forces", but no places were reserved at Sandhurst for Gambian soldiers. The conference also made plans for the distribution of two regular commissioned and two short service officers, but by 1955 these had not been carried out. In September 1956, a proposal was presented to transfer the Regiment to local government control, with some financial support from the UK. The British government agreed in March 1957, but pointed out that due to the economic situation in the Gambia, the country could not be asked to increase its contributions to the maintenance of the regiment. Economic problems in the UK led to a reassessment, and later that year the Treasury said that within three years the Gambia would have to take full responsibility for its armed forces.

According to Vidler, "the prospect of maintaining the Regiment in the context of limited resources proved decisive." It was decided that an armed police wing would be cheaper and therefore a more sensible security option. The proposal to disband the regiment was not resisted by the country's elite or by the press. In 1958, the Governor of the Gambia, Percy Wyn-Harris, recommended that the Gambia Regiment was disbanded for financial reasons. The strength of the unit on 31 December 1957 was reported to be five British officers, two British enlisted, and 161 African enlisted. The regiment was progressively reduced from 1 January to 31 March after which it was to be placed in a state of "suspended animation". In December 1957, prior to its disbandment, then-Secretary of State for the Colonies Alan Lennox-Boyd sent the following message to the regiment:

Your Governor and Commander-in-Chief will have told you that the Gambia Regiment will shortly cease to be an effective unit of Her Majesty's forces. The Gambia Regiment with its record of service in two World Wars has a proud place amongst the Regiments of the Royal West African Frontier Force and I well know how disappointing it must be that you can no longer serve in the Regiment. Changes in the defence policy of Her Majesty's Government mean that it is no longer necessary to maintain the Regiment in being, and the needs of the Gambia itself will be met by an expansion of the Police Force. Some of you will, I expect, join the military wing of the Police, but whether you do or not I am sure you will not let the spirit and traditions of the Regiment die. I send you all my good wishes.

In its place, the Gambia Field Force, a paramilitary unit, was formed to replace it. The Gambia Field Force, in turn, was replaced by the Gambian National Army in 1984.

== Uniform ==
The parade uniform of the regiment consisted of khaki drill shorts with red fezzes, along with scarlet zouave-style jackets. The jacket style was inherited from the West India Regiment. The jackets had a yellow edging and red cummerbunds. In the field, the regiment originally wore a variation of the Kilmarnock cap, but just prior to World War II this changed to the slouch hat. Similarly, British officers attached to the regiment initially wore pith helmets, but they also later changed to the slouch hat. Although most uniforms in the RWAFF were similar, the special distinction of the Gambia Regiment was a khaki and brown puggree, and a brown cummerbund.

== Commanding officers ==
Name	Attached from	Term		Ref
Captain F. O. Graham	Royal Marines	1901	1906	
Captain W. C. N. Hastings DSO	Manchester Regiment	1906	1909	
Captain R. D. F. Oldman DSO	Royal Norfolk Regiment	1909	1910	
Captain I. G. Sewell	Royal Fusiliers	1910	1911	
Captain Herbert Thomas Dobbin	Duke of Cornwall's Light Infantry	1911	1913	
Captain V. B. Thurston	Dorset Regiment	1913	1916	
Captain R. Law	Royal Dublin Fusiliers	1916	1919	
Captain H. T. C. Strange MC	Royal East Kent Regiment	1919	?	
Major T. P. L. Molloy	Dorset Regiment	1932	1938	
Captain T. A. Davis	King's Regiment (Liverpool)	1938	1939	
Lieutenant Colonel G. Laing MBE	Duke of Wellington's Regiment		1944	
Lieutenant Colonel Antony Read MC	Oxfordshire and Buckinghamshire Light Infantry	1944	1945	

== Honours and awards ==
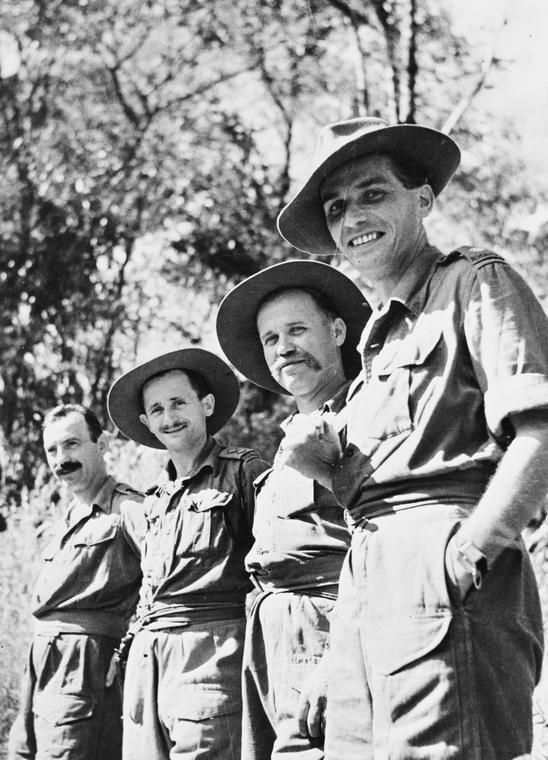
Polish officers of the Gambia Regiment in 1945.

=== Battle honours ===
First World War	Cameroons 1914–16, Nyangao, East Africa 1916–18
Second World War	North Arakan, Kaladan, Mowdok, Nyohaung, Burma 1943–45

=== Medal recipients ===
During World War One, a number of Gambia Company soldiers won medals. These include three recipients of the African Distinguished Conduct Medal (DCM): Company Sergeant Major Ebrima Jalu, Sergeant Samba Bah, and Private Saljen Sidibi.

A number of Gambia Regiment soldiers and officers won medals for their service in Burma. The most senior of these was a Distinguished Service Order (DSO) to Lieutenant Colonel Antony Read for his "outstanding leadership" of 1st Battalion, Gambia Regiment during 1944 and 1945. Captain Jan Zieleznik was awarded a Military Cross (MC), as was Captain David Montague Cookson. The following were awarded a Military Medal (MM): Corporal Buba Kaita, Lance Corporal Samba Jallow, Lance Corporal Jallow Yaryah, Private Bokari Bojan, Private Kamara Kinti, Private Musa N'Jie, and Private N'Dowe Dudu. Further to this, Major Stanislaw Lisiecki was made a Member of the Order of the British Empire (MBE), and Regimental Sergeant Major Simba Sallow was awarded a British Empire Medal (BEM). A number of others were also Mentioned in Dispatches.

== See also ==
- Gambia Armed Forces
- Royal West African Frontier Force
- Ghana Regiment, formerly the Gold Coast Regiment
- Nigeria Regiment
- Gambia Constabulary, contemporary armed police force
