= Nigeria Regiment =

British colonial regiment formed in 1914

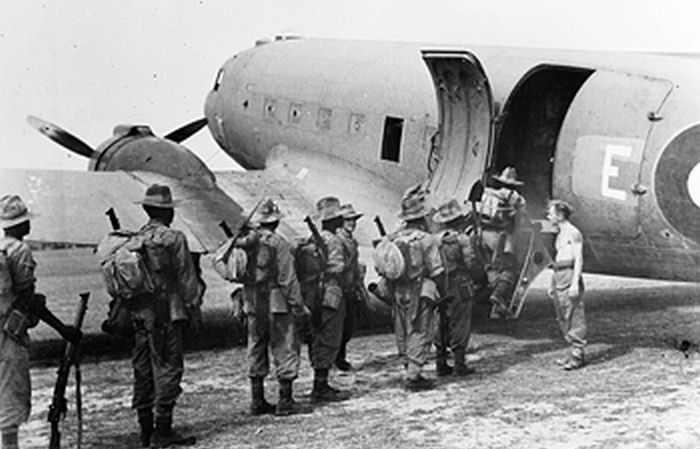
- Troops of the Nigeria Regiment, 3rd West African Brigade (Thunder), board an RAF Dakota for Operation Thursday.
- Active: 1 January 1914–1956
- Country: Nigeria
- Allegiance: British Empire
- Branch: British Colonial Auxiliary Forces
- Type: Line infantry
- Role: Light infantry
- Size: Five battalions
- Part of: Royal West African Frontier Force
- Garrison/HQ: Lagos
- Engagements: World War II: Capture of Dabel (1940)

Commanders
- Colonel-in-Chief: Elizabeth II

The Nigeria Regiment was a British Colonial Auxiliary Forces unit of the Royal West African Frontier Force was formed by the amalgamation of the Northern Nigeria Regiment and the Southern Nigeria Regiment on 1 January 1914.

== Structure ==
At that time of its founding, the regiment consisted of five battalions:

- 1st Battalion - ex 1st Bn, Northern Nigeria Regiment
- 2nd Battalion - ex 2nd Bn, Northern Nigeria Regiment
- 3rd Battalion - ex 3rd Bn, Northern Nigeria Regiment
- 4th (Lagos) Battalion - ex 2nd Bn, Southern Nigeria Regiment
- 5th Battalion - ex 1st Bn, Southern Nigeria Regiment

== History ==
=== World War I ===
The regiment served throughout the First World War in the Cameroons (1914-1916), and in East African Campaign (1916-1918). In the Second World War, the regiment saw service in the East African Campaign where it carried out the fastest advance in military history against Italian forces and in Burma where it provided the bulk of the 81 and 82 West African divisions. In addition 3 West African Brigade was attached throughout the Second Chindits operation of 1944.

=== World War II ===
At the start of World War II the 4th battalion, along with the 6th, 7th and 12th battalions, was grouped with the 1st Sierra Leone Rifles and 1st Battalion, Gambia Regiment, to form the 6th (West Africa) Infantry Brigade. The battalion remained in Nigeria while the first three battalions fought the Italians in East Africa. The battalion remained in Nigeria for local defense and to train new recruits. With the Fall of France the battalion was the only defense for the country against possible Vichy French threats from neighboring colonies. The battalion continued on this duty until the Vichy French threat faded in 1942.

With the decision to form two West African divisions the 6th West African Brigade joined the 81st West African Division on 31 Mar 1943. The regiment returned to Nigeria in May 1946.

=== Post World War ===
In 1956, at the time of the visit of Queen Elizabeth II, the regiment was renamed The Queen's Own Nigeria Regiment, Royal West African Frontier Force, part of the Nigerian Military Forces.

There was eventually a Nigeria Regiment Training Centre at Zaria, a field company of engineers, and a field battery of artillery. In its last years the battalions were stationed in Kaduna, Enugu, Ibadan, and Abeokuta (one each); these rotated stations.

Domestically, the regiment had a negative image for their punitive behaviour as instrument of British imperial policy. Until shortly before independence in 1960 there was still a majority of British officers, and some specialist British NCOs. Johnson Aguiyi-Ironsi was commissioned as early as 1949 (with the result that he later became the first Nigerian General Officer Commanding of the Army and the first military head of state), but the number of African officers rose only slowly during the 1950s.

== Notable personnel ==
- Michael Crowder, historian (national service, 1953–54).
- Johnson Aguiyi-Ironsi, first Military Head of State of Nigeria (1942–1960).
