= Royal West African Frontier Force =

British colonial military force (1900–1960)

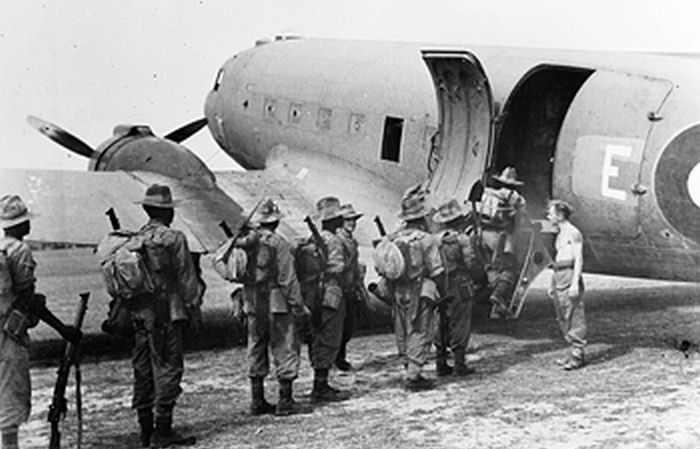
- Troops of the Nigeria Regiment RWAFF on active service in Burma 1944
- Active: 1900–1960
- Country: British West Africa
- Allegiance: British Empire
- Branch: Army
- Size: 200,000+

The West African Frontier Force (WAFF) was a multi-battalion field force, formed by the British Colonial Office in 1900 to garrison the West African colonies of Nigeria, Gold Coast, Sierra Leone and Gambia. In 1928, it received royal recognition, becoming the Royal West African Frontier Force (RWAFF).

== Origins ==
The War Office was considering the creation of a military force from the West African colonies prior to 1897, but the Benin Expedition of 1897 and similar tension around Nigeria allowed them to create a much more substantial military force. By July 1897, the War Office had successfully completed the reorganisation of the Egyptian army and thought a similar process would be wise in West Africa. The Secretary of State for War, the Marquess of Lansdowne, advised the Colonial Office that it was possible at no additional cost to create a "homogeneous Imperial force available for any emergency" in West Africa.

The decision to raise this force was taken in 1897 because of British concern at French colonial expansion in territories bordering on Northern Nigeria. The first troops were from that area and thought of by the British as "Hausas" - to the end of colonial rule, the Hausa language was a lingua franca in a very multi-tribal force, especially in Nigeria. The task of raising the new locally recruited force was entrusted to Colonel Frederick Lugard, who arrived in Nigeria in 1898. The following year, an interdepartmental committee recommended the amalgamation of all existing British colonial military forces in West Africa under the designation of the West African Field Force. Rivalry between Britain and France for control of the trade on the River Niger led to the occupation of areas by the French, for instance at Illo, and the stationing of the Frontier Force at Yashikera and elsewhere in the region.

On formation in 1900, the WAFF comprised:

- Gold Coast Regiment – 1 battalion infantry and 1 battery mountain artillery
- Northern Nigeria Regiment – 3 battalions infantry (including 1 mounted)
- Southern Nigeria Regiment – 2 battalions infantry and 2 batteries mountain artillery
- Sierra Leone Battalion – 1 battalion
- The Gambia Company – 1 company

By 1908, the WAFF in Northern Nigeria comprised two battalions of infantry, two batteries of artillery and one company of engineers. The infantry battalions at that time had an establishment of 1,200 men, the artillery batteries had 175 men and there were 46 engineers. There were 217 British officers, non-commissioned officers and specialists. Mounted infantry detachments were subsequently raised. The standard weapon was the .303 Martini-Enfield carbine, and the force had 30 QF 2.95 inch mountain guns (quick-firing, man-portable pack howitzers) for the artillery.

== First World War (1914–1918) ==
The West African Frontier Force first saw action during the occupation of the German Kamerun (now Cameroon and part of present-day Nigeria). The experience gained in this campaign during 1914–16, in difficult terrain against stubborn resistance, made the WAFF a valuable reinforcement to the British Empire forces operating against the German Schutztruppe (colonial troops) in East Africa led by General Paul von Lettow-Vorbeck. One battalion of the Gold Coast Regiment arrived in German East Africa in 1916, and was soon joined by four battalions of the Nigeria Regiment. All remained active in this theatre of war until 1918.

=== WAFF strength, 1914–1918 ===
By the end of the First World War, regimental strengths were as follows:

- The Gold Coast Regiment – 5 battalions
- The Nigeria Regiment – 9 battalions
- The Royal Sierra Leone Regiment – 1 battalion
- The Gambia Regiment – 2 companies

=== Battle honours, 1914–1918 ===
The following battle honours were awarded separately to the constituent regiments of the WAFF during the First World War:

- Kamina
- Duala
- Garua
- Banyo
- Cameroons, 1914–1916
- Behobeho
- Nyangao
- East Africa, 1916–1918

== Interwar period ==
Between 1919 and 1939 the RWAFF reverted to its peacetime role of an all regular multi-battalion force, recruited from diverse regions and with a commitment to serve in any of the British West African colonial territories. Organisation and roles were influenced by those of the British Indian Army during the same era.

== Second World War (1939–1945) and after ==
=== Situation in the beginning and officer shortfall, Polish influence ===
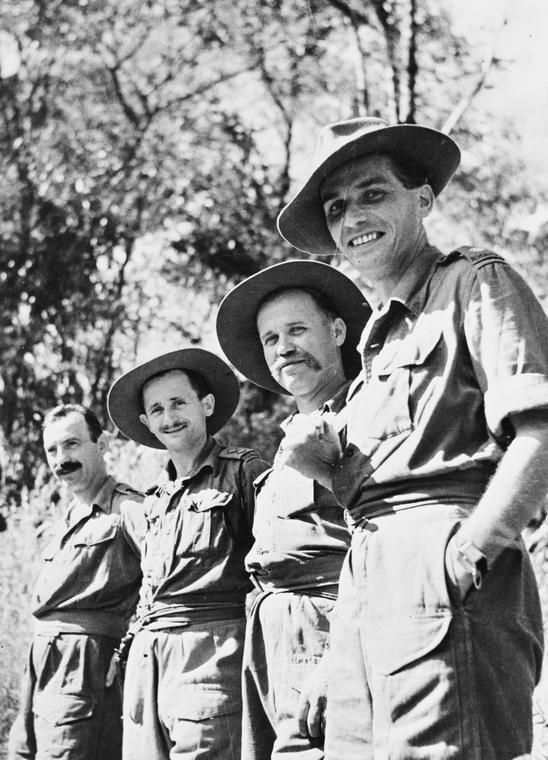
Polish officers of the Gambia Regiment during World War II. From left to right: Lt. Adam Grzywacz, Lt. Weisław Bułkowski, Captain Jan Żeleźnik, Major Stanislaw Lisiecki.

In peacetime the Royal West African Frontier Force (RWAFF) had numbered five battalions of infantry, but during the war increased to several dozen plus ancillaries. Each RWAFF infantry battalion included over 80 white Europeans. In total, white officers and non-commissioned officers constituted 14.6% of the RWAFF. Normally, the officers were British ones who had volunteered to temporarily serve in Africa and then return to their old unit. However, there was a reluctance in the Second World War as many had volunteered just for the duration of the war and saw the important fighting as closer to home. Other potential sources of white officers, Rhodesia and South Africa, failed to make up the shortfall. It became necessary for the War Office to begin drafting officers for service in Africa, although many commanders saw this as an opportunity to rid themselves of their worst officers. Efforts to allow black officers to serve were slow to develop, with only the Territorial Battalion of the Gold Coast Regiment permitting black officers by 1939, and only two officers being commissioned at all by the end of the war.

Prime Minister Winston Churchill was informed on a visit to West Africa in May 1941 that it was necessary to find a large number of officers for the RWAFF. Churchill asked Władysław Sikorski, who was keen to support the British and also to find a use for his officers, for 400 Polish officers and Sikorski so agreed. All told, 273 Polish officers served in the British West African forces during the war. They were commissioned on Emergency Commissions between the ranks of Second Lieutenant and Captain. The Polish officers were poorly prepared for the posting and many of them did not have an adequate level of English. Following the fall of Poland, and subsequently of France, a large of number of the surviving Polish military had evacuated to England. While the Polish Air Force was incorporated into the Royal Air Force, surviving members of the Polish Army (who were primarily officers) were garrisoned in Scotland in the unlikely event Polish soldiers for them to command would appear.

=== World War II ===
In 1939, the RWAFF was transferred from Colonial Office to War Office control. Under the leadership of General George Giffard (GOC West Africa), the RWAFF served as a cadre for the formation of 81st (West Africa) Division and 82nd (West Africa) Division. Both divisions saw service during the Second World War, serving in Italian Somaliland, Abyssinia, and Burma.

==== RWAFF strength, 1939-1945 ====
Twenty-eight battalions, including training battalions, were raised during the Second World War.

- Gold Coast Regiment
  - 1st Battalion Gold Coast Regiment – served in East Africa with 24 G.C. Brigade and Burma with 2 (W.A.) Brigade, 82 (W.A.) Division
  - 2nd Battalion Gold Coast Regiment – served in East Africa with 24 G.C. Brigade and Burma with 2 (W.A.) Brigade, 82 (W.A.) Division
  - 3rd Battalion Gold Coast Regiment – served in East Africa with 24 G.C. Brigade and Burma with 2 (W.A.) Brigade, 82 (W.A.) Division
  - 4th Battalion Gold Coast Regiment – sent to Gambia
  - 5th Battalion Gold Coast Regiment – served in Burma with 5 (W.A.) Brigade, 81 (W.A.) Division
  - 6th Battalion Gold Coast Regiment – Training battalion
  - 7th Battalion Gold Coast Regiment – served in Burma with 5 (W.A.) Brigade, 81 (W.A.) Division
  - 8th Battalion Gold Coast Regiment – served in Burma with 5 (W.A.) Brigade, 81 (W.A.) Division
  - 9th Battalion Gold Coast Regiment – Coast Defence/ area defence battalion for Takoradi
- Nigeria Regiment
  - 1st Battalion Nigeria Regiment – served in East Africa with 23 Nigeria Brigade and Burma with 1 (W.A.) Brigade, 82 (W.A.) Division
  - 2nd Battalion Nigeria Regiment – served in East Africa with 23 Nigeria Brigade and Burma with 1 (W.A.) Brigade, 82 (W.A.) Division
  - 3rd Battalion Nigeria Regiment – served in East Africa with 23 Nigeria Brigade and Burma with 1 (W.A.) Brigade, 82 (W.A.) Division
  - 4th Battalion Nigeria Regiment – served in Burma with 6 (W.A.) Brigade, 81 (W.A.) Division
  - 5th Battalion Nigeria Regiment – served in Burma with 4 (W.A.) Brigade, 82 (W.A.) Division
  - 6th Battalion Nigeria Regiment – served in Burma with 4 (W.A.) Brigade, 82 (W.A.) Division
  - 7th Battalion Nigeria Regiment – served in Burma with 3 (W.A.) Brigade, 81 (W.A.) Division
  - 8th Battalion Nigeria Regiment – Training battalion
  - 9th Battalion Nigeria Regiment – served in Burma with 3 (W.A.) Brigade, 81 (W.A.) Division
  - 10th Battalion Nigeria Regiment – served in Burma with 4 (W.A.) Brigade, 82 (W.A.) Division
  - 11th Battalion Nigeria Regiment
  - 12th Battalion Nigeria Regiment – served in Burma with 3 (W.A.) Brigade, 81 (W.A.) Division
  - 13th Battalion Nigeria Regiment – Coast Defence battalion for Lagos.
  - 14th Battalion Nigeria Regiment
- Sierra Leone Regiment
  - 1st Battalion Sierra Leone Regiment – served in Burma with 6 (W.A.) Brigade, 81 (W.A.) Division
  - 2nd Battalion Sierra Leone Regiment
  - 3rd Battalion Sierra Leone Regiment – Coast Defence/ area defence battalion for Freetown
- Gambia Regiment
  - 1st Battalion Gambia Regiment – served in Burma with 6 W.A. Brigade, 81 (W.A.) Division
  - 2nd Battalion Gambia Regiment – Coast Defence/ area defence battalion for Gambia

=== Post war ===
In 1947, the RWAFF reverted to Colonial Office control. After the war, the RWAFF comprised the Nigeria Regiment (five battalions, stationed at Ibadan, Abeokuta, Enugu, and two in Kaduna, with a field battery of artillery and a field company of engineers), the Gold Coast Regiment, and the Sierra Leone Regiment (including a company in Gambia).

When Queen Elizabeth II visited Nigeria in 1956, she awarded the Nigeria Regiment the honour of the title: the "Queen's Own Nigeria Regiment". During the Second World War, the war-service of some of the support corps of the RWAFF had similarly received Royal recognition, to become: the Royal West African Artillery (RWAA), and the Royal West African Engineers (RWAE).

Despite the approach of independence, the military authorities were slow in commissioning African officers. For example, at the time of the Queen's visit, the 1st Battalion of the Nigeria Regiment had only two African officers, both lieutenants, Kur Mohammed (later assassinated with Abubakar Tafawa Balewa) and Robert Adebayo (commissioned in 1953 as the 23rd West African military officer). The American writer John Gunther, writing in 1953, did, however report meeting "two or three smart young Negro officers of the West African Frontier Force" in Lagos. Gunther noted that all were former aides-de-camp and that he did not meet non-white ADCs in any of the other African colonies that he visited. Johnson Aguiyi-Ironsi was at that time the only African who had advanced to the rank of major. He became the first General Officer Commanding of the army of independent Nigeria.

== RWAFF disbanded at independence ==
In 1957, the British colony of The Gold Coast obtained independence as Ghana and the Gold Coast Regiment was withdrawn from the RWAFF to form the Ghana Regiment of Infantry in the newly independent nation. The RWAFF was finally disbanded in 1960 as the British colonies of Nigeria, Sierra Leone and The Gambia moved towards independence. The former RWAFF units formed the basis of the new national armies of their respective states.

== Uniforms ==
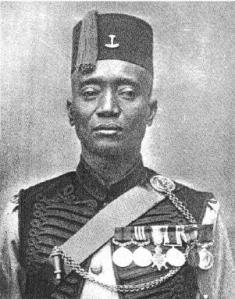
Sergeant Alhaji Grunshi of the Gold Coast Regiment WAFF in full dress uniform 1918

The parade uniform of the RWAFF throughout its history was a distinctive one. It comprised khaki drill, red fezes, sleeveless scarlet zouave style jackets edged in yellow, and red cummerbunds. Artillery units wore blue jackets with yellow braid and engineers red with blue braid. African sergeants and warrant officers were distinguished by yellow braiding on the front of their jackets. The badge on the fez was a palm tree. For field dress, khaki shirt, shorts, jersey and puttees were worn with a round kilmarnock cap.

British officers wore khaki serge or drill uniforms with tropical helmets (later bush or slouch hats) for review order and field dress. A green and black hackle was worn on the bush hats. For evening functions, a white mess uniform with rolled collar was worn with cummerbunds in blue for artillery and battalion colours for infantry officers.

Because of its identification with colonial rule, this uniform was replaced shortly after Nigerian independence by a high-collared dark green tunic, peaked cap and light coloured trousers. In Ghana (formerly the Gold Coast), a scarlet and blue British style dress uniform was adopted.

== Commanders ==
From 1901 to 1938, the WAFF (and later the RWAFF) was administered by an Inspector General. From 1945, the force was administered by a Colonel Commandant.

=== Inspectors General ===
- Brigadier-General G. V. Kemball DSO – 1901–1905
- Brevet Colonel Thomas Morland DSO – 1905–1909
- Major-General Sir Percival Spearman Wilkinson KCMG CB – 1909–1913
- Brevet Colonel Charles M. Dobell DSO – 1913–1914
- Vacant – 1914–1920
- Colonel A. H. W. Haywood CMG CBE DSO – 1920–1923
- Colonel on the Staff R. D. F. Oldman CMG DSO – 1924–1926
- Colonel S. S. Butler CMG DSO – 1926–1930
- Vacant – 1930–1932
- Brigadier C. C. Norman CMG CBE DSO – 1932–1936
- General Sir George Giffard GCB DSO – 1936–1938
- Vacant – 1938–1945 (role filled by General Officer Commanding, West Africa Command)

=== Colonels Commandant ===
- General Sir George James Giffard, GCB, DSO – 1945–1954
- Brigadier Charles Roger Alan Swynnerton, CB, DSO – 1954–1958
- General Sir Lashmer Gordon Whistler, GCB, KBE, DSO – 1958–1960

=== Colonels-in-Chief ===
The RWAFF received royal patronage through its Colonels-in-Chief:

- 1928 FM HM King George V
- 1936 FM HM King Edward VIII
- 1936 FM HM King George VI
- 1953 HM Queen Elizabeth II

== See also ==
- 1st (West Africa) Infantry Brigade
- 2nd (West Africa) Infantry Brigade
- East African Campaign (World War II)
- Emmanuel Cole
- Hugh Trenchard in Nigeria
- West African campaign (World War I)

== References and sources ==
Bibliography

- Clifford, Sir Hugh Charles, The Gold Coast Regiment in the East African Campaign, London, John Murray, 1920.
- Downes, Capt. Walter D., With the Nigerians in German East Africa, London, Methuen & Co. Ltd, 1919.
- Estep, Charles. The Empire's Smallest Regiment: The Gambia Company of the West African Frontier Force, 1902-1958. Double Dagger Books, 2022.
- Gorges, E. H., The Great War in West Africa, Hutchinson & Co. Ltd., London, 1930; Naval & Military Press, Uckfield, 2004: ISBN 1-84574-115-3
- Hanley, G., Monsoon Victory, London, Mayflower, 1969.
- Hayward, Col. A. & Clarke, Brig. F.A.S., The History of the Royal West African Frontier Force, Aldershot, UK, Gale and Polden, 1964.
- Hordern, C., Military Operations East Africa, Volume 1, August 1914 – September 1916, Nashville, Battery Press, with Imperial War Museum, London, 1990 (reprint of 1941 publication).
- Lunt, J., Imperial Sunset: Frontier Soldiering in the 20th Century, London, Macdonald Futura Publishers, 1981.
- MacDonald, J. F., The War History of Southern Rhodesia 1939–45, Volume I, Salisbury, Government of Southern Rhodesia, 1947.
- MacDonald, J. F., The War History of Southern Rhodesia 1939–45, Volume II, Rhodesiana Reprint Library – Silver Series, Volume 11, Bulawayo, Books of Rhodesia, 1976 (reprint of 1947 publication).
- Military Report on Northern Nigeria, War Office (1908)
- Ekoko, Edho (1979). "The West African Frontier Force Revisited". Journal of the Historical Society of Nigeria. 10 (1): 47–63. JSTOR 41971313.
- Healy, Michael S. (1999). "'The Polish White Infusion': Polish Officers in Britain's Royal West African Frontier Force, 1941–1945". The Polish Review. 44 (3): 277–293. JSTOR 25779137.
