= Hovell =

Hovell is a surname. Notable people by that name include:

- William Hovell (1786–1875), English explorer of Australia.
- Mark Hovell (1888–1916), English historian.

== Hovell-Thurlows ==
- Francis Hovell-Thurlow-Cumming-Bruce, 8th Baron Thurlow
- Thomas Hovell-Thurlow-Cumming-Bruce, 5th Baron Thurlow
- Roualeyn Hovell-Thurlow-Cumming-Bruce, 9th Baron Thurlow
- Edward Hovell-Thurlow, 2nd Baron Thurlow
- Henry Hovell-Thurlow-Cumming-Bruce, 7th Baron Thurlow
- Charles Hovell-Thurlow-Cumming-Bruce, 6th Baron Thurlow
