= Baynards Park =

Privately owned park in Surrey, England

Coordinates: 51.1208°N 0.4509°W

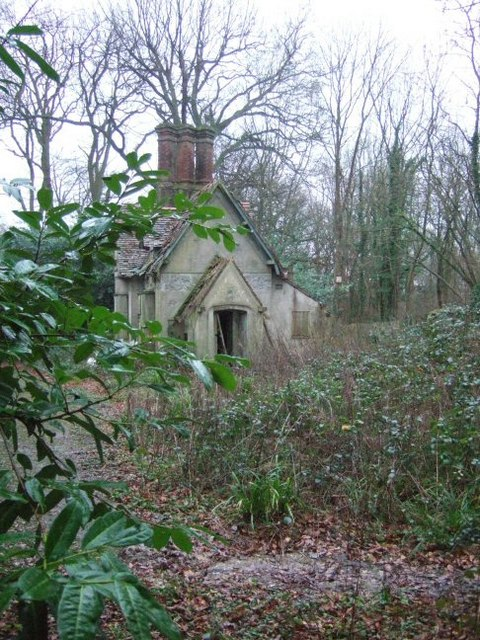
Longhurst Lodge, a disused gatehouse on the Baynards Park Estate. The property was later restored and featured on The Restoration Man series.

Baynards Park is a 2,000 acres (810 ha) estate and site of a demolished country house with extant outbuildings, privately owned, in the south of the parishes of Cranleigh and Ewhurst, Surrey.

== History ==
In 1447 William Sydney the younger obtained a licence to impark (i.e. enclose) 800 acres (320 ha) appertaining to his 'manor' of Baynards, however its exact status at that time is dubious, being possibly still held as an under-tenant of Pollingfold Manor to the south-west. His granddaughter, as heir of this part of these larger estates, married William Uvedale, who inherited, the estate passing, after a period of profit-sharing to his several heirs, to the Bray family including, soon after by an intra-family deal, Sir Edward Bray.

Bray mortgaged the property to John Reade of Sterborough who transferred this debt to Sir George More of Loseley. As the wealth of the elite grew but before the heyday of the British Empire, the Elizabethan architecture manor house was built by More, on taking possession in 1587, using his wife, Constantia's money. His heirs exchanged this with Witley whose main manor belonged to Sir Francis Woolley of Pirford (now Pyrford), his nephew.

Three quick sales ensured (1607–1609) to Edward Bayninge, Isaac Woder and Robert Jossey. The estate was then, due to the foreclosure of Jossey's son's mortgage, sold by Richard Gurney, to John Evelyn's father in 1631. It was then still as a gentleman's main residence. However the house descended through Evelyn's heirs, becoming a farm-house by the time of being owned by one, Arthur Onslow, the noted Speaker (of the House of Commons), who while in possession resided at Knowle Manor, Cranleigh, and whose son and later heirs made their principal homes at Imber Court, East Molesey (demolished and subdivided) and at Clandon Park, Clandon (intact).

In 1818 the then-Lord Onslow sold Pollingfold and Baynards to John Smallpeice of Guildford. He may have used the house in his capacity as the last Out-Ranger of Windsor Forest, which even then was deemed to extend as far as Guildford. In 1824 Pollingfold was sold to Richard Gates. However, in 1832 the twin, neighbouring estates were reunited by the Rev. Thomas Thurlow, son of another Thomas, Bishop of Durham and nephew to the Lord Chancellor Thurlow, by a bold purchase. He extended and remodelled the house, under the direction of Sir Matthew Digby Wyatt, and made a fine collection of paintings, armour, furniture and tapestry, which remained until at least 1911 in the house.

Baynards, by then a proper adjoining small hamlet, saw a return to its grand house, transformed at the time in a somewhat old-fashioned but majestic, classical Georgian style 1832-40 primarily by employing Thomas Rickman and Benjamin Ferrey under Wyatt.

In the 1860s the LBSCR set out to develop the Cranleigh Line. As the branch line would cross outskirts of this estate, as a condition of sale the then Lord Thurlow (the 5th Baron), insisted on having a station built to serve his estate, despite there being no nearby settlement. Baynards railway station opened on 2 October 1865, covering 0.45 acres (0.18 ha), providing a stationmaster's house, two waiting rooms, covered platforms, storesheds, a booking hall, a porch and a large goods shed. The station also served as the local Post Office, and would have up to 30 horses and carts outside on market days. The 19.25 miles (30.98 km) line closed on 14 June 1965, four months before its centenary.

In 1952, to pay the death duties of his father, Henry Charles Hovell-Thurlow-Cumming-Bruce, 7th Baron Thurlow sold the estate, possibly to Henry Lyons (created Lord Ennisdale), who died in 1963. With the house Grade II listed in 1960, it was then bought in 1965 by helicopter entrepreneur Alan Bristow for over £300,000. In 1979, the house, which had been unoccupied for 11 years and was being used as a barn to store hay, burnt down in suspicious circumstances, after planning permission had been refused for alterations submitted earlier that year.

After clearance of the manor house site, today only the walled gardens, cottages, bell-tower, gatehouse and four lodges survive, many somewhat neglected. After the death of Bristow in 2009, the estate was bought by a property development company. Denied permission to develop the estate for private housing, they sold it to a retirement home operator, who intend to rebuild a replica manor house on the original foundations. Longhurst Lodge was purchased privately in 2009 and restored.

== Architecture (before demolition of main structure) ==
The house was mainly of brick, but the foundations were (and are) of Sussex marble and the roof of Horsham slates, both found in the area.
