= Roualeyn Cumming-Bruce =

British barrister and judge (1912–2000)

The Right Honourable Sir Roualeyn Cumming-Bruce

Lord Justice of Appeal
- In office 7 March 1977 – 14 April 1985
- Preceded by: Sir David Cairns
- Succeeded by: Sir John Balcombe

Justice of the High Court
- In office 1964–1977

Personal details
- Born: James Roualeyn Hovell-Thurlow-Cumming-Bruce; 9 March 1912
- Died: 12 June 2000 (aged 88)
- Education: Magdalene College, Cambridge

Sir James Roualeyn Hovell-Thurlow-Cumming-Bruce, PC (9 March 1912 – 12 June 2000) was a British barrister and judge who was a Lord Justice of Appeal from 1977 to 1985.

== Biography ==
Roualeyn Cumming-Bruce was the third son of the Charles Edward Hovell-Thurlow-Cumming-Bruce, 6th Baron Thurlow, and the younger of identical twin boys. His grandfather was a British Liberal politician who was Paymaster General in 1886. Earlier relations were Bishop of Durham and Lord Chancellor. His eldest brother Harry became 7th Baron Thurlow in 1952, and his elder twin brother Francis became 8th Baron Thurlow in 1971.

Roualeyn was educated at Shrewsbury School and Magdalene College, Cambridge, where he took a first in classics. He became an honorary Fellow at Magdalene in 1977. Cumming-Bruce was an active communist whilst at Cambridge, once arguing during a debate at the Cambridge Union that "hope lay in the adoption of the Soviet system – a system which combined the spirit of democracy with swift and certain action."

He was called to the Bar at Middle Temple in 1937, where he became a Bencher in 1959 and was Treasurer in 1975. In the Second World War, he served in the Royal Artillery in North Africa and the Middle East, becoming a lieutenant colonel.

He resumed his mixed legal practice after the war. He was Chancellor of the Diocese of Ripon from 1954 to 1957, Recorder of Doncaster from 1957 to 1958 and Recorder of York from 1958 to 1961. He was appointed Junior Counsel to the Treasury (Common Law) in 1959.

In 1964 he became a High Court judge (as Mr Justice Cumming-Bruce), in the Probate, Divorce and Admiralty Division (later the Family Division) and received the customary knighthood. He presided over some interesting divorce cases: he granted a divorce to the wife of Tony Hancock for cruelty and adultery.

Despite a conviction for drunk driving 18 months earlier, he was promoted to the Court of Appeal (as Lord Justice Cumming-Bruce) and joined the Privy Council in 1977. One of his early appeal cases was Miller v. Jackson, in which he joined Lord Denning in ruling that a cricket club could continue to play matches on a village green, even though balls were occasionally hit onto neighbouring properties.

== Family ==
He married Lady Sarah Savile, the youngest daughter of the 6th Earl of Mexborough, in 1955. She predeceased him in 1991. They had a daughter and two sons.

His identical twin brother Francis, the eighth Baron Thurlow, was High Commissioner to New Zealand from 1959 to 1963, High Commissioner to Nigeria from 1963 to 1966, and Governor of The Bahamas from 1968 to 1972. Cumming-Bruce claimed that he would occasionally attend the House of Lords as his brother in his absence.
