= Roualeyn =

Roualeyn is an English masculine given name. Notable people with the name include:

- David Roualeyn Findlater Bain (1954–2016), English priest and clown
- Roualeyn Cumming (1891–1981), English cricketer and police officer
- Roualeyn Cumming-Bruce (1912–2000), English barrister and judge
- Roualeyn George Gordon-Cumming (1820–1866), Scottish traveller and sportsman
- Roualeyn Hovell-Thurlow-Cumming-Bruce, 9th Baron Thurlow (born 1952), British peer
