= Thurlow =

Thurlow is a surname and a given name. Notable people with the name include:

Surname:

- Alan Thurlow (born 1946), English organist
- Bryan Thurlow (1936–2002), English professional football player
- Clifford Thurlow (born 1952), British biographer
- Edward Thurlow, 1st Baron Thurlow, (1731–1806), British lawyer and Lord Chancellor 1778–1783
- Natalie Thurlow (born as Campbell), New Zealand curler
- Pud Thurlow (1903–1975), Australian cricketer
- Steve Thurlow (born 1942), American professional football player
- Thomas Thurlow (disambiguation), multiple people
- Colette and Hannah Thurlow in the English rock band 2:54

Given name:

- Thurlow Cooper (1933–2008), American football player
- Thurlow Essington (1886–1964), American lawyer and politician
- Thurlow Lieurance (1878–1963), American composer
- Thurlow Weed (1797–1882), American newspaper publisher and politician
- Thurlow "Tad" Weed (1933–2006), American football placekicker

Thurlow is also a former township in Hastings County, Ontario, now part of Belleville, Ontario, Canada.

== See also ==
- Baron Thurlow
- (Great) Thurlow, a village in Suffolk
