= Baron Thurlow =

Barony in the Peerage of Great Britain

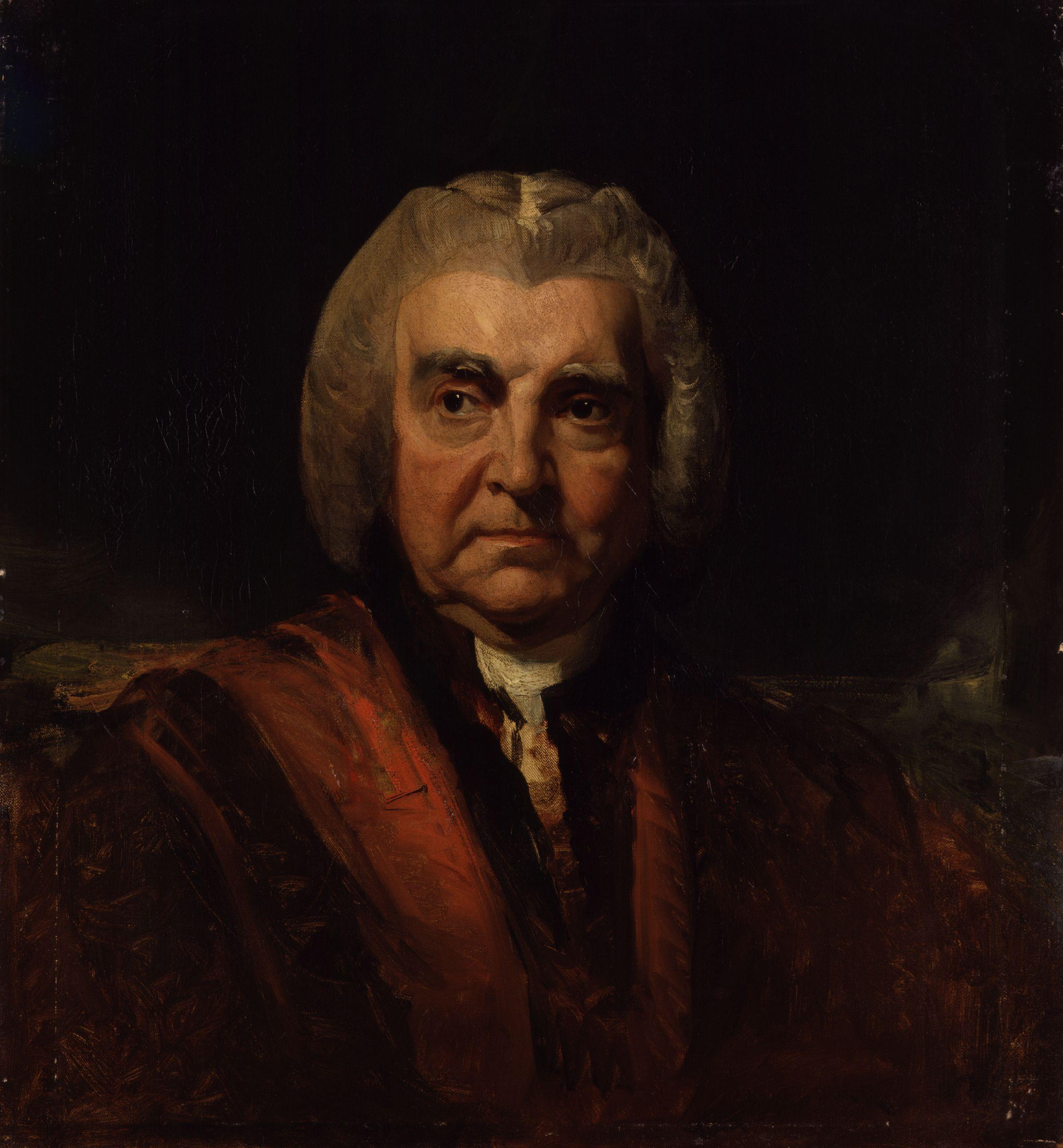
Edward Thurlow, 1st Baron Thurlow

Baron Thurlow, of Thurlow in the County of Suffolk, is a title in the Peerage of Great Britain. It was created on 11 June 1792 for the lawyer and politician Edward Thurlow, 1st Baron Thurlow, with remainder to his younger brothers and the heirs male of their bodies.

Thurlow had already on his appointment as Lord Chancellor on 3 June 1778 been created Baron Thurlow, of Ashfield in the County of Suffolk, in the Peerage of Great Britain, with remainder to the heirs male of his body. Lord Thurlow never married and on his death in 1806 the barony of 1778 became extinct, while he was succeeded in the barony of 1792 according to the special remainder by his nephew Edward, the second Baron. The latter was the son of the Right Reverend Thomas Thurlow, Bishop of Durham from 1787 to 1791. Lord Thurlow gained a reputation as a minor poet. In 1813, he married the actress Mary Catherine Bolton, and they had three sons. In 1814 he assumed by royal licence the additional surname of Hovell, in commemoration of his ancestor Sir Richard Hovell.

His grandson, the fifth Baron (who succeeded his elder brother), was a Liberal politician and served as Paymaster General in 1886. In 1873 he assumed by royal licence the additional surname of Bruce, which was that of his father-in-law, James Bruce, 8th Earl of Elgin. One year later, Lord Thurlow assumed by royal licence the additional surname of Cumming.

In 1952, to pay the death duties of his father, the sixth Baron, Henry, the seventh Baron, sold the family house in Surrey, Baynards Park. It was later owned by helicopter entrepreneur Alan Bristow, under whose ownership the Grade II-listed Elizabethan country house burnt down in 1980.

The title was then held by the seventh Baron, a soldier who won a DSO and bar in World War II and served as GOC in Malta. He was succeeded by his younger brother in 1971. The eighth Baron Thurlow was a diplomat and notably served as High Commissioner to New Zealand and Nigeria and as Governor of the Bahamas. In 2013 he was succeeded by his son, the ninth Baron, who in 2015 was elected by the hereditary peers to sit in the House of Lords.

== Barons Thurlow, first creation (1778) ==
- Edward Thurlow, 1st Baron Thurlow (1730–1806)

== Barons Thurlow, second creation (1792) ==
- Edward Thurlow, 1st Baron Thurlow (1730–1806)
- Edward Hovell-Thurlow, 2nd Baron Thurlow (1781–1829)
- Edward Thomas Hovell-Thurlow, 3rd Baron Thurlow (1814–1857)
- Edward Thomas Hovell-Thurlow, 4th Baron Thurlow (1837–1874)
- Thomas John Hovell-Thurlow-Cumming-Bruce, 5th Baron Thurlow (1838–1916)
- Charles Edward Hovell-Thurlow-Cumming-Bruce, 6th Baron Thurlow (1869–1952)
- Henry Charles Hovell-Thurlow-Cumming-Bruce, 7th Baron Thurlow (1910–1971)
- Francis Edward Hovell-Thurlow-Cumming-Bruce, 8th Baron Thurlow (1912–2013)
- Roualeyn Robert Hovell-Thurlow-Cumming-Bruce, 9th Baron Thurlow (b. 1952)

The heir apparent is the present holder's son, the Hon. Nicholas Edward Hovell-Thurlow-Cumming-Bruce (b. 1986)
The heir apparent's heir apparent is his son, George Hovell-Thurlow-Cumming-Bruce (b. 2018)

== Male-line family tree ==
Male-line family tree, Barons Thurlow (both creations).

Rev. Thomas Thurlow died 1762
Baron Thurlow (1778, 1792)
Edward Thurlow; 1st Baron Thurlow; 1730–1806 | Rt Rev. Thomas Thurlow; 1737–1791
1778 barony extinct
Edward Hovell-Thurlow; 2nd Baron Thurlow; 1781–1829
Edward Hovell-Thurlow; 3rd Baron Thurlow; 1814–1857
Edward Hovell-Thurlow; 4th Baron Thurlow; 1837–1874 | Thomas Hovell-Thurlow- Cumming-Bruce; 5th Baron Thurlow; 1838–1916
Capt. Hon. James Cumming-Bruce; 1867–1899 | Charles Hovell-Thurlow- Cumming-Bruce; 6th Baron Thurlow; 1869–1952
Henry Hovell-Thurlow- Cumming-Bruce; 7th Baron Thurlow; 1910–1971 | Francis Hovell-Thurlow- Cumming-Bruce; 8th Baron Thurlow; 1912–2013
Roualeyn Hovell-Thurlow- Cumming-Bruce; 9th Baron Thurlow born 1952
Hon. Nicholas Hovell-Thurlow- Cumming-Bruce born 1986
George Hovell-Thurlow- Cumming-Bruce born 2018
