= Francis Hovell-Thurlow-Cumming-Bruce, 8th Baron Thurlow =

British peer (1912–2013)

Francis Edward Hovell-Thurlow-Cumming-Bruce
- 8th Baron Thurlow
- Tenure: 1971-2013
- Known for: Diplomat
- Born: 9 March 1912
- Died: 24 March 2013 (aged 101); England
- Spouse: Yvonne Wilson
- Issue: 4
- Parents: Reverend Charles Edward Hovell-Thurlow-Cumming-Bruce, 6th Baron Thurlow; Grace Trotter

Francis Edward Hovell-Thurlow-Cumming-Bruce, 8th Baron Thurlow, KCMG (9 March 1912 – 24 March 2013) was a British diplomat. He was the last surviving former British colonial governor of The Bahamas.

Thurlow was the second son of the Reverend Charles Hovell-Thurlow-Cumming-Bruce, 6th Baron Thurlow, and a grandson of the Liberal politician Thomas Hovell-Thurlow-Cumming-Bruce, 5th Baron Thurlow, who served as Paymaster General under William Ewart Gladstone. In 1971 he succeeded his elder brother, Henry Hovell-Thurlow-Cumming-Bruce, 7th Baron Thurlow as 8th Baron Thurlow.

== Biography ==
Thurlow was educated at Shrewsbury School and Trinity College, Cambridge, where he graduated to Master of Arts (M.A.).

Thurlow was a civil servant at the Department of Agriculture in Scotland from 1935–37. Through the period of World War II (1939-1944), he was secretary at the High Commission of the United Kingdom, Wellington New Zealand, and at the High Commission of the United Kingdom, Ottawa Canada 1944–1945. He was Private Secretary to the Secretary of State for Commonwealth Relations from 1947 to 1949, then counselor to the High Commission of the United Kingdom, New Delhi, India from 1949 to 1952. He became advisor to the Governor of the Gold Coast in 1955; when that colony became independent as Ghana in 1957, he was appointed Britain's first Deputy High Commissioner there, moving on to become Deputy High Commissioner in Canada in 1959.

Thurlow served as High Commissioner to New Zealand from 1959 to 1963, as High Commissioner to Nigeria from 1963 to 1966, Deputy Under-Secretary of State at the Foreign, Commonwealth and Development Office in 1964, and as Governor of The Bahamas from 1968 to 1972.

After retiring from the service, he was appointed chairman of the Institute of Comparative Study of History, Philosophy and the Sciences in 1975.

Thurlow's younger identical twin brother Sir Roualeyn Cumming-Bruce, PC, was a Judge of the High Court of Justice and a Lord Justice of Appeal.

== Personal life ==
On 11 August 1949, Thurlow married Yvonne Diana Aubyn Wilson (1917 - 1990), who became Baroness Thurlow. They had four children:

- Roualeyn Hovell-Thurlow-Cumming-Bruce, 9th Baron Thurlow, b. 1952
- Hon. Diana Miranda Hovell-Thurlow-Cumming-Bruce, b. 1954
- Hon. Aubyn Cecilia Hovell-Thurlow-Cumming-Bruce, b. 1958
- Hon. Peter Torquil Francis Hovell-Thurlow-Cumming-Bruce, 1962-1985

== Death ==
Thurlow died in England at the age of 101.

== Arms ==
Coat of arms of Francis Hovell-Thurlow-Cumming-Bruce, 8th Baron Thurlow
Crest -: 1st upon a cap of maintenance Proper a dexter arm in armour from the shoulder resting on the elbow also Proper the hand holding a sceptre erect Or the arm charged for distinction with a cross crosslet Gules.; 2nd a lion rampant Or holding in the dexter paw a dagger Proper charged on the shoulder for distinction with a cross crosslet Azure.; 3rd a raven Proper with a portcullis hung round her neck Argent.; 4th a greyhound couchant Or collared and line reflexed over the back Sable.; Escutcheon Quarterly: 1st Or a saltire Gules on a chief of the last in the sinister canton a mullet of the first charged with a crescent of the second and for distinction a cross crosslet Gold (Bruce); 2nd Azure three garbs Or and for distinction in the centre chief point a cross crosslet of the last (Cumming); 3rd Argent upon a chevron between two chevronels Sable three portcullises with chains and rings of the field (Thurlow); 4th Or a cross Sable (Hovell). Supporters Two greyhounds Or collared and lined Sable. Motto -: 1st - Fuimus (We Have Been); 2nd - Courage; 3rd - Justitae Soror Fides (Faith Is The Sister Of Justice); 4th - Quo Fata Vocant (Wherever Fate May Call)

Diplomatic posts
Preceded by Sir Howard George Charles Mallaby	British High Commissioner to New Zealand; 1959–1963	Succeeded by Sir Arthur Norman Galsworthy
Preceded by The Viscount Head	British High Commissioner to Nigeria; 1963–1966	Succeeded by Sir David Hunt
Preceded by The Lord Grey of Naunton	Governor and Commander-in-Chief of the Bahamas; 1968–1972	Succeeded by Sir John Warburton Paul
Peerage of Great Britain
Preceded by Henry Hovell-Thurlow-Cumming-Bruce	Baron Thurlow; 1971–2013	Succeeded by Roualeyn Hovell-Thurlow-Cumming-Bruce
