= Cyril Colquhoun =

British Army officer (1903–1996)

Major-General Sir Cyril Colquhoun KCVO CB OBE
- Born: 1903; Pietermaritzburg, South Africa
- Died: 5 June 1996 (aged 92–93)
- Allegiance: United Kingdom
- Branch: British Army
- Rank: Major-General
- Commands: 6th Field Regiment; 76th Field Regiment; 1st Field Regiment; Royal School of Artillery; 50th (Northumbrian) Infantry Division
- Conflicts: Second World War
- Awards: Knight Commander of the Royal Victorian Order; Companion of the Order of the Bath; Officer of the Order of the British Empire

Major-General Sir Cyril Harry Colquhoun, KCVO, CB, OBE (1903 – 5 June 1996) was a British Army officer.

== Military career ==
Educated at Oswestry High School and the Royal Military Academy, Woolwich, Colquhoun was commissioned into the Royal Artillery on 29 August 1923. He was deployed to France as Brigade Major, Royal Artillery, in the 42nd (East Lancashire) Infantry Division with the British Expeditionary Force in 1939 at the start of the Second World War and took part in the Dunkirk evacuation for which he was mentioned in dispatches. He went on to be commanding officer of 6th Field Regiment and led his regiment in the Normandy landings and the campaign in North West Europe.

After the war he became commanding officer of the 76th Field Regiment in British Army of the Rhine and then the 1st Field Regiment in the Middle East. He went on to become became Commander, Royal Artillery for 1st Infantry Division in September 1948, Commandant of the Royal School of Artillery in September 1951 and then General Officer Commanding 50th (Northumbrian) Infantry Division and Northumbrian District in August 1953. After that he become General Officer Commanding, Malta in November 1956 before retiring in December 1959.

In retirement he served as Secretary of the Central Chancery of the Orders of Knighthood from 1960 to 1968 and, in that capacity, advised on commissioning the Sovereign's insignia and the Chancellor's Chain of Office for the new Order of Canada.

He was appointed a Companion of the Order of the Bath in the 1955 New Year Honours, appointed a Knight Commander of the Royal Victorian Order in the 1965 New Year Honours, and advanced to Knight Commander of the Royal Victorian Order in the 1968 Birthday Honours.

Military offices
Preceded by Horatius Murray	GOC 50th (Northumbrian) Infantry Division; 1953–1956	Succeeded by William Hulton-Harrop
