= John Balcombe =

British Lord Justice of Appeal (1925–2000)

The Right Honourable Sir John Balcombe

Lord Justice of Appeal
- In office 11 June 1985 – 2 August 1995
- Preceded by: Sir Roualeyn Cumming-Bruce

Justice of the High Court
- In office 1977–1985

Sir Alfred John Balcombe, PC (29 September 1925 – 9 June 2000) was a Lord Justice of Appeal from 1985 to 1995.

== Education ==
Balcombe attended Winchester College under a scholarship.

== Career ==
He was called to the Bar at Lincoln's Inn, 1950 (Bencher, 1977; Treasurer, 1999); he practised at the Chancery Bar, 1951–77. He was appointed a QC in 1969. He was a Judge of the High Court of Justice, Family Division, 1977–85. He was a Judge of the Employment Appeal Tribunal, 1983–85.

He was a member of the Bar council, 1967–71.

He was knighted in 1977 and made a Privy Councillor in 1985.

=== Other positions held ===
- Member, Steering Committee for Revenue, Tax Law Rewrite, 1997–98.
- Chairman, London Marriage Guidance Council, 1982–88.
- President, SW London Branch, Magistrates' Association, 1993–2000.
- President, The Maccabaeans, 1990–2000.
- Master, Company of Tin Plate Workers, 1971–72.
- Senior Grand Warden, United Grand Lodge of England of the Freemasons, 1996–98.
- Honorary Fellow, Hebrew University of Jerusalem, 1996

== Arms ==
Coat of arms of John Balcombe
Motto Dulcis Et Domus
