= Miller v Jackson =

English tort law case

- Court: Court of Appeal of England and Wales
- Full case name: John Edward Miller and Brenda Theresa Miller v. R. Jackson and J. J. Cromerty
- Decided: 6 April 1977
- Citation: [1977] EWCA Civ 6 [1977] 3 All ER 338, [1977] 3 WLR 20, [1977] QB 966

Court membership
- Judges sitting: Lord Denning, Geoffrey Lane LJ, Cumming-Bruce LJ

Case opinions
- Lord Denning, Geoffrey Lane LJ, Cumming-Bruce LJ

Keywords
- Nuisance, Negligence: Multitude of the risk

Miller v Jackson [1977] QB 966 is a famous Court of Appeal of England and Wales case in the torts of negligence and nuisance. The court considered whether the defendant – the chairman of a local cricket club, on behalf of its members – was liable in nuisance or negligence when cricket balls were hit over the boundary and onto the property of their neighbours, Mr and Mrs Miller, the plaintiffs.

Initially the Millers won an injunction at Nottingham High Court preventing cricket being played at the ground. This was overturned at the Court of Appeal which decided that an injunction was not appropriate because cricket should be allowed to be played at the club ground. However, it did decide to increase the damages paid to the Millers to account for past and any future damages caused to their property by stray cricket balls. Shortly after the conclusion of the case, the Millers moved house.

The judgment was based on two key point of English common law. First that the Millers faced from cricket balls an obvious risk to themselves and their property. Even though the club was unable to foresee when an accident might occur, it was found to be negligent whenever a ball caused damage. Second the repeated intrusion of cricket balls into the Millers' property was deemed to constitute a legal nuisance and therefore was legally actionable.

== Facts ==
Cricket had been played at a small cricket ground in Lintz, near Burnopfield, County Durham, since 1905, on land leased to the club by the National Coal Board. The National Coal Board also owned a field adjacent to the ground, which it sold to Stanley Urban District Council. The council sold the land to George Wimpey for development. A line of new semi-detached houses were built next to the ground in 1972, one of which, 20, Brackenridge, was bought by the Millers.

The Millers' garden boundary was only 100 feet (30 m) from the nearest batting crease, and their house only 60 feet (18 m) further away. Several cricket balls were hit onto their property over the following years, causing minor damage to their house (chipped paintwork, broken roof tiles) and risking personal injury to the Millers.

Despite measures taken by the club to minimise recurrences, including the erection of a 8 feet 9 inches (2.67 m) high fence in March 1975 on top of a 6 feet (1.8 m) boundary wall and asking batsmen to try to hit fours rather than sixes, a few balls continued to be hit out of the ground each season. For example, in 1975, 36 matches were played over 20 weeks in the summer, with 2,221 six-ball overs being bowled. Out of the 13,326 legitimate deliveries (ignoring no-balls and wides) there were 120 sixes, of which six crossed the fence and fell into the housing estate.

The club offered to meet the cost of any property damage (£400), and suggested further countermeasures, such as louvred window shutters, and a net over the Millers' garden. The Millers were not content and sued for damages and an injunction to prevent cricket being played on the ground.

The case is well known for the lyrical opening to Lord Denning's judgment, the first paragraph of which reads:

In summertime village cricket is the delight of everyone. Nearly every village has its own cricket field where the young men play and the old men watch. In the village of Lintz in County Durham they have their own ground, where they have played these last 70 years. They tend it well. The wicket area is well rolled and mown. The outfield is kept short. It has a good club house for the players and seats for the onlookers. The village team play there on Saturdays and Sundays. They belong to a league, competing with the neighbouring villages. On other evenings after work they practise while the light lasts. Yet now after these 70 years a judge of the High Court has ordered that they must not play there any more. He has issued an injunction to stop them. He has done it at the instance of a newcomer who is no lover of cricket. This newcomer has built, or has had built for him, a house on the edge of the cricket ground which four years ago was a field where cattle grazed. The animals did not mind the cricket. But now this adjoining field has been turned into a housing estate. The newcomer bought one of the houses on the edge of the cricket ground. No doubt the open space was a selling point. Now he complains that when a batsman hits a six the ball has been known to land in his garden or on or near his house. His wife has got so upset about it that they always go out at week-ends. They do not go into the garden when cricket is being played. They say that this is intolerable. So they asked the judge to stop the cricket being played. And the judge, much against his will, has felt that he must order the cricket to be stopped: with the consequence, I suppose, that the Lintz Cricket Club will disappear. The cricket ground will be turned to some other use. I expect for more houses or a factory. The young men will turn to other things instead of cricket. The whole village will be much the poorer. And all this because of a newcomer who has just bought a house there next to the cricket ground.

== Judgment ==
=== High Court ===
Reeve J. heard the case at first instance in the High Court in Nottingham. He delivered his judgment on 3 December 1976, granting the Millers the injunction they sought, and ordering the club to pay general damages of £150 for negligence and nuisance, for the inconvenience and interference with the use of the Millers' property.

The defendants appealed against the injunction, and the plaintiffs cross-appealed for an increase in the award of damages. Michael Kempster QC and James N. Harper appeared as counsel for the club; James Chadwin QC and Frederick Such as counsel for the Millers at a two-day hearing on 31 March and 1 April 1977.

=== Court of Appeal ===
The Court of Appeal delivered its judgment on 6 April 1977. Geoffrey Lane and Cumming-Bruce LJJ held that there was a foreseeable risk of injury to the plaintiffs and their property from the cricket balls and the club could not prevent accidents from happening. The club was guilty of negligence "on each occasion when a ball comes over the fence and causes damage to the plaintiffs". The repeated interference with their property was also held to be an actionable nuisance. Following Sturges v. Bridgman, the fact that the Millers had "come to the nuisance" was no defence. On that basis, the Millers were awarded damages. Lord Denning MR dissented from the finding of negligence and nuisance, holding that "the public interest should prevail over the private interest". However, on the basis that the club had agreed to pay for any damage, Lord Denning was "content that there should be an award of £400 to cover any past or future damage".

Geoffrey Lane LJ would have upheld the injunction. However, Lord Denning MR and Cumming-Bruce LJ held that damages were a sufficient remedy, holding that the discretionary equitable remedy of an injunction was not necessary. In the words of Cumming-Bruce LJ, the court had to "strike a fair balance between the right of the plaintiffs to have quiet enjoyment of their house and garden without exposure to cricket balls occasionally falling like thunderbolts from the heavens, and the opportunity of the inhabitants of the village in which they live to continue to enjoy the manly sport which constitutes a summer recreation for adults and young persons". The Millers had bought a house with the benefit of an open space adjacent to their land, and had to accept that the innocent and lawful use of the open land could restrict the enjoyment of their garden.

It is notable that the court did not hold that holding cricket matches on the ground was negligent, per se; rather, there were separate negligent acts each time a ball left the ground.

Not long after the case, the Millers moved house.

== See also ==
- Bolton v Stone [1951] AC 850, [1951] 1 All ER 1078, in which the House of Lords considered negligence in another cricket case
