= William Hulton-Harrop =

British Army officer

Major-General William Hulton-Harrop CB DSO
- Born: 7 May 1906
- Died: 1979 (aged 72−73)
- Military career
- Allegiance: United Kingdom
- Branch: British Army
- Service years: 1926−1959
- Rank: Major-General
- Service number: 34623
- Unit: King's Shropshire Light Infantry
- Commands: 3rd Infantry Brigade; 158th Infantry Brigade; 50th (Northumbrian) Infantry Division; Yorkshire District
- Conflicts: Second World War
- Awards: Companion of the Order of the Bath; Distinguished Service Order

Major-General William Harrington Hulton-Harrop, CB, DSO (7 May 1906 – 1979) was a British Army officer.

== Military career ==
After graduating from the Royal Military College, Sandhurst, Hulton-Harrop was commissioned into the King's Shropshire Light Infantry on 4 February 1926. He served on the Northwest Frontier of India between 1930 and 1931. He saw action in the Italian campaign during the Second World War, for which he was appointed a Companion of the Distinguished Service Order. He was also briefly acting Commanding Officer of 3rd Infantry Brigade in the Middle East in April / May 1945.

After the war he became Commander of 158th Infantry Brigade in October 1949, Deputy Director of Movements at the War Office in February 1955 and General Officer Commanding 50th (Northumbrian) Infantry Division and Northumbrian District in September 1956. He went on to be General Officer Commanding Yorkshire District in May 1959 before retiring in October 1959.

He was appointed a Companion of the Order of the Bath in the 1959 New Year Honours.

Military offices
Preceded by Cyril Colquhoun	GOC 50th (Northumbrian) Infantry Division; 1956–1959	Succeeded by Lord Thurlow
