= Thomas Thurlow =

Thomas Thurlow may refer to:

- Thomas Thurlow (bishop) (1737–1791), English bishop
- Thomas Thurlow (sculptor) (1813–1899), English sculptor
