= James Chadwin =

British lawyer (1930–2006)

James Armstrong Chadwin QC (7 June 1930 – 16 January 2006) was a prominent British barrister, whose cases included defending Peter Sutcliffe, the "Yorkshire Ripper".

Chadwin was born in Glasgow and educated at the High School of Glasgow, Glasgow University (where he read modern languages and met the woman he was to marry) and Jesus College, Oxford. Whilst at Oxford, he was active as an actor and director in university theatre and also joined the Oxford University Air Squadron. He then spent six years in the Royal Air Force as an education officer at RAF Sandwich, his eyesight not being good enough to enable him to be a pilot.

He was then called to the bar by Gray's Inn in 1958 and joined chambers in Newcastle upon Tyne where his contemporaries included Peter Taylor, later Lord Chief Justice of England and Wales. Chadwin practised mainly in the field of criminal law and became a Queen's Counsel in 1976. He also became a Recorder in the same year, presiding over some trials at the Old Bailey. He was later appointed a Bencher of Gray's Inn and, in 1988, Leader of the Northern Circuit.

Chadwin represented Peter Sutcliffe in 1981. Sutcliffe had admitted killing 13 women and attempting to kill seven others. Four psychiatrists reported on Sutcliffe and diagnosed paranoid schizophrenia, and Sir Michael Havers QC, the Attorney-General, was prepared to accept a plea of guilty to manslaughter on the grounds of diminished responsibility. However, the trial judge, Mr Justice Boreham, refused to accept this plea and so Sutcliffe was tried for murder. Chadwin's attempts to secure a manslaughter verdict failed, although the jury returned a majority verdict of 10:2 reflecting doubts that two jurors had.

Apart from Sutcliffe, his clients included Anthony Arkwright, who committed four murders and mutilated his victims' corpses. He also represented Donna Anthony, who was convicted of killing her two children. The prosecution relied on evidence from Professor Sir Roy Meadow, whose evidence was later discredited. Chadwin appeared unsuccessfully for Donna Anthony on her first appeal, but illness prevented him representing her on her second, successful, appeal. Amongst his civil cases, Miller v. Jackson was a Court of Appeal decision on whether a cricket club was liable in nuisance and negligence to neighbouring residents when sixes were hit by players into their garden. Chadwin represented the neighbours and obtained an award of damages, although the injunction that had been granted at trial against the cricket club was overturned on appeal.

Chadwin, who was married with four children, died in 2006. His obituary in The Times described him in this way:

An advocate of considerable charm and charisma, Chadwin was able to influence juries with an almost effortless ease. With his rotund figure, battered wig and penchant for cheroots, he bore more than a passing resemblance to Horace Rumpole. Like John Mortimer’s creation, he had an ingenious mind that frequently produced surprising results. His good-natured humour and seemingly limitless fund of anecdotes was much admired by other barristers and by the Bench.
