= 44th Infantry Brigade (United Kingdom) =

44th Brigade 44th Infantry Brigade
- Active: 1914-1918; 1939-1946
- Country: United Kingdom
- Branch: British Army
- Type: Infantry
- Size: Brigade
- Part of: 15th (Scottish) Infantry Division
- Engagements: First World War; Second World War Operation Overlord Operation Epsom Operation Jupiter (1944) Operation Bluecoat

The 44th Infantry Brigade was an infantry brigade of the British Army that saw active service in both the First and the Second World Wars, and served with the 15th (Scottish) Infantry Division.

== First World War ==
The brigade was raised, as 44th Brigade, in 1914 as part of Kitchener's New Armies shortly after the outbreak of the First World War. With the 15th (Scottish) Division, the brigade saw active service on the Western Front in Belgium and France.

The brigade command the following units:

- 9th (Service) Battalion, Black Watch (Royal Highlanders) (until February 1918)
- 8th (Service) Battalion, Seaforth Highlanders (Ross-shire Buffs, The Duke of Albany's)
- 9th (Service) Battalion, Gordon Highlanders (left January 1915)
- 10th (Service) Battalion, Gordon Highlanders (left May 1916)
- 8th/10th (Service) Battalion, Gordon Highlanders (from May 1916 until June 1918)
- 7th (Service) Battalion, Queen's Own Cameron Highlanders (from January 1915 until June 1918)
- 1/4th (City of Dundee) Battalion, Black Watch (Royal Highlanders) (from November 1915 until January 1916)
- 44th Machine Gun Company, Machine Gun Corps (formed 12 January 1916, moved to 15th Battalion, Machine Gun Corps 17 March 1918)
- 44th Trench Mortar Battery (formed 25 June 1916)
- 4th/5th Battalion, Black Watch (Royal Highlanders) (from June 1918)
- 1/5th (Buchan and Formartine) Battalion, Gordon Highlanders (from June 1918)

In May 1916 the 8th and 10th (Service) battalions of the Gordon Highlanders merged to form the 8th/10th Battalion.

The North Uist-born war poet Dòmhnall Ruadh Chorùna, a highly important figure in 20th century Scottish Gaelic literature, saw combat with the 7th (Service) Battalion King's Own Cameron Highlanders, 44th Infantry Brigade, 15th (Scottish) Division during the trench warfare along the Western Front and vividly described his war experiences in verse.

== Second World War ==
The brigade was also active during the Second World War as the 44th Infantry Brigade, the formation was organised as a 2nd Line Territorial Army Brigade as a duplicate of the 155th Infantry Brigade, and again formed part of 15th (Scottish) Infantry Division, which was itself the duplicate of the 52nd (Lowland) Infantry Division. Throughout the war the brigade went through many changes and reorganisations.

=== Order of battle ===
The brigade had the following composition:

- 8th Battalion, Royal Scots
- 6th Battalion, King's Own Scottish Borderers
- 7th Battalion, King's Own Scottish Borderers (until 5 October 1942)
- 44th Infantry Brigade Anti-Tank Company (formed 14 October, disbanded 14 December 1940)
- 11th Battalion, Argyll and Sutherland Highlanders (from 14 October until 27 December 1942)
- 6th Battalion, Royal Scots Fusiliers (from 28 December 1942)

=== Training ===
The brigade remained in England at the Dene Park battle school near Tonbridge, for most of the war, before crossing the channel to fight in Normandy as part of Operation Overlord on 13 June 1944, a week after D-Day on 6 June. The brigade was now commanded by Brigadier Harry Cumming-Bruce.

On 7 November 1942, 181st Field Regiment, Royal Artillery ('The Shropshire Gunners') was assigned to the division and began training with 44th Brigade, with whose units it would operate in action:

- 177 Battery supporting 8th Royal Scots
- 178 Battery supporting 6th King's Own Scottish Borderers
- 179 Battery supporting 6th Royal Scots Fusiliers

=== Operation Epsom ===
Operation Epsom was an attack by the British Second Army, commanded by Lieutenant General Miles Dempsey, which was intended to outflank and seize Caen in France during the Battle of Normandy. It failed with heavy casualties but forced the Germans to abandon their offensive plans in Normandy and tied most of their armoured units to a defensive role.

A preliminary attack, Operation Martlet, was launched on 25 June by the 49th (West Riding) Infantry Division of XXX Corps, to secure ground on the flank of the intended advance. The attack gained some ground but the weather was still foul and the attackers were hampered by muddy ground and lack of air support. Some dominating terrain on the right flank of the intended attack by VIII Corps was still in German hands.

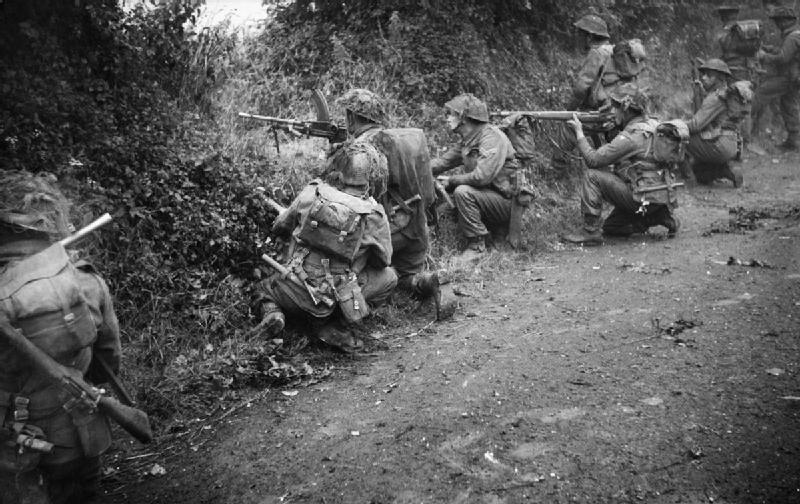
Infantrymen of the 6th Battalion, Royal Scots Fusiliers in action in a sunken lane during Operation 'Epsom', Normandy, 26 June 1944.

Nevertheless, to be certain of anticipating any German attack the main attack was launched on 26 June. Although held up on parts of the front by infantry of 12th SS Panzer Division Hitlerjugend, the 15th (Scottish) Infantry Division and the 31st Armoured Brigade gained four miles on their left flank. Further to their left the 43rd (Wessex) Infantry Division also gained ground. John Keegan described their advance:

"...The division was attacking two brigades up, which meant that six of its infantry battalions were in the first wave, with the other three waiting in the rear to support the leaders. As each brigade also attacked two up, however, this meant there were in fact only four battalions on the start line, each strung out along a front of about 1,000 yards. And since each battalion, about 750 men strong, likewise kept two of their four companies in reserve, the true number of men who started forward into the cornfields that morning was probably no more than 700. They are best pictured, as they would have looked from the cockpit of any passing spotter aircraft, as 24 groups of 30 riflemen, called platoons, separated by intervals of about 150 yards...Each platoon consisted of three smaller groups, called sections, which were led by a corporal, and were based on the Bren machine gun which gave them their firepower...".

On 27 June, after repulsing small armoured counter-attacks, the 15th (Scottish) Infantry Division gained more ground and captured a bridge over the River Odon. The 11th Armoured Division passed through to capture Hill 112, a mile to the southeast. This deep penetration alarmed the German command and Hausser was ordered to commit his units to contain and eliminate the Allied salient. The German command was in some disarray, as General Dollmann, commanding the German Seventh Army died of a heart attack immediately after ordering Hausser to mount the counter-attack and Field marshals Rommel and von Rundstedt were en route to a conference with Adolf Hitler and out of touch with their headquarters.

=== Hill 112, Operation Jupiter ===
The British forces included the men of the 11th Armoured Division, 15th (Scottish) Infantry Division, 43rd (Wessex) Infantry Division and 53rd (Welsh) Infantry Division. Principal among the units fighting on Hill 112, and the tanks of 7th and 9th Royal Tank Regiments, plus numerous other units. Approximately 63,000 men over a period of seven weeks fought on and around Hill 112.

The main attack on Hill 112 was designed to fix the German panzers and gain 'elbow room' in what was still a tight beachhead. The German defenders endured naval bombardment, air attack and artillery fire but held their ground, crucially supported by Tiger II tanks from the 101st SS Heavy Panzer Battalion. These tanks armed with the 88 mm gun had both greater protection and firepower and outclassed the opposing British Churchill and Sherman tanks.

Even though the hill was not captured and remained in no-man's-land between the two armies, important surrounding villages had been taken. Above all, however, the 9th Hohenstaufen SS Panzer Division, which had been in the process of moving out of the line to form an operational reserve, was brought back to contain the British. Therefore, on the strategic level Operation Jupiter was a significant success.

It was not until American troops eventually started to break out from the Normandy lodgement, as Operation Cobra developed momentum, in August 1944, that the Germans withdrew from Hill 112 and the 53rd (Welsh) Infantry Division was able to occupy the feature with barely a fight.

Casualties during that period amounted to approximately 25,000 British troops and 500 British tanks.

=== Operation Bluecoat ===
Operation Bluecoat was an attack by the British Second Army in the Battle of Normandy, from 30 July 1944 to 7 August 1944. The objectives of the attack were to secure the key road junction of Vire and the high ground of Mont Pinçon. Strategically, the attack was made to support the American exploitation of their breakout on the western flank of the Normandy beachhead.

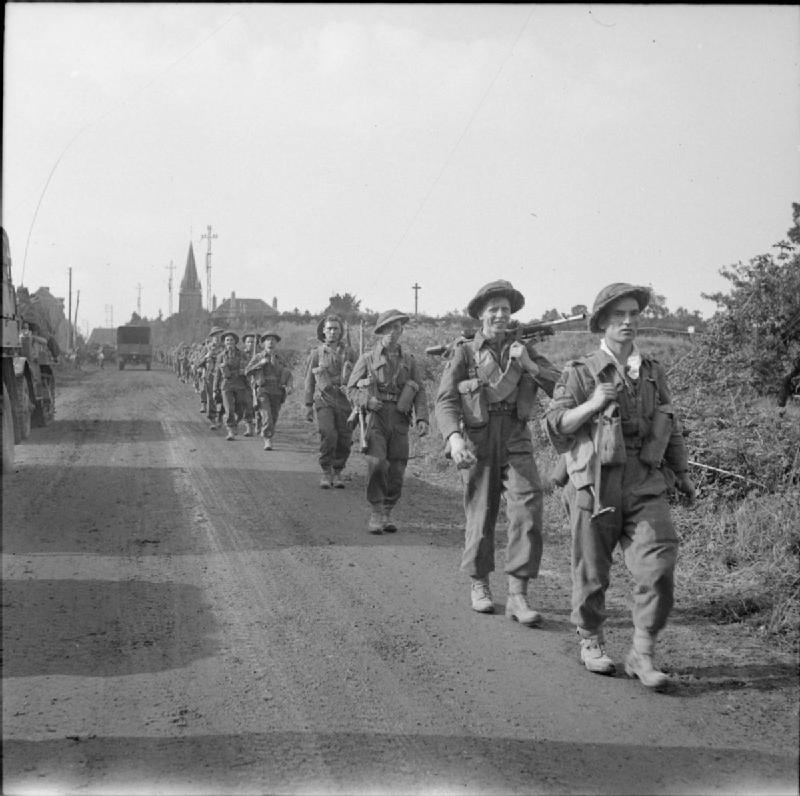
Infantrymen of the 8th Battalion, Royal Scots march towards St Pierre Tarentaine, France, 3 August 1944.

Lieutenant-General Miles Dempsey, commanding the British Second Army, was switched westward towards Villers-Bocage adjacent to the American army. Originally, Dempsey planned to attack on 2 August, but the speed of events on the American front forced him to advance the date.

Initially, only two weak German infantry divisions held the intended attack frontage, south and east of Caumont, although they had laid extensive minefields and constructed substantial defences. They also occupied ideal terrain for defence, the bocage.

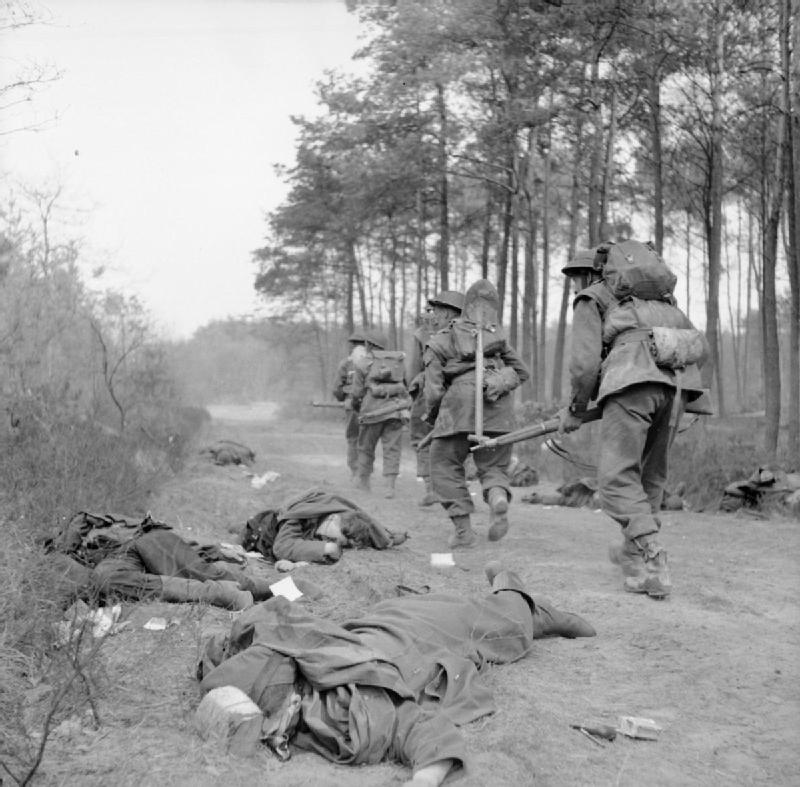
Men of the 6th Battalion, King's Own Scottish Borderers advance warily along a lane, past the bodies of German soldiers, east of the Rhine, 25 March 1945.

Afterwards the brigade and division fought virtually continuously from then on through Caumont, the Seine Crossing, the Gheel Bridgehead, Best, Tilburg, Meijel, Blerwick, the Maas and across the Rhine.
