= Longhurst Lodge =

Historic house in Surrey, England

- Pictured around 1900

- Location within Surrey

General information
- Architectural style: Victorian
- Location: Baynards Park, Surrey, Cranleigh, England
- Coordinates: 51°07′34″N 0°27′17″W
- Completed: c. 1837
- Owner: 1955–1961; The Gould family 2009–present Nik Huddy & Vanessa Ford-Robbins

Technical details
- Floor count: 2
- Floor area: 700 sq.ft.

Design and construction
- Architect: Thomas Rickman

Listed Building – Grade II
- Official name: Lodge to Baynards Park
- Designated: 28 September 1987
- Reference no.: 1189746

Longhurst Lodge is a Grade II listed building in Cranleigh, Surrey, England. It is located on the former Baynards Park estate, about a quarter of a mile northwest of where the country house stood. It became a listed building in 1987.

The property, a Victorian gate lodge, is located at one of the gated entrances to the estate. It is one of four such lodges on the estate, commissioned by the Reverend Thomas Thurlow around 1837, after he purchased the estate.

After being left to dereliction for the 48 years since it was previously occupied — by Irene Gould, her husband and three sons, between 1955 and 1961 — two Cranleigh residents, Vanessa Ford-Robbins and Nik Huddy, purchased the property in 2009 for £250,000 with a view to making it their home. The renovation was followed from April 2011 (about six months into the project) in the Channel 4 show The Restoration Man (season 3, episode 14). Upon completion, it was the first time the building had gas, hot water and electricity in it.

The new owners won the Special Heritage Award at the 2013 Waverley Design Awards. During the Restoration Man final visit, the owners indicated their plan to run classes on the skills they learned during the renovation.

== Structure and layout ==
=== Exterior ===
The building has a Roman cement render with a steeply pitched plain tiled roof. It is a cruciform plan with triple diagonal stacks on a ridge plinth at the crossing of the two ranges. The upper storey and attic is under a gabled dormer. Friezes of grapes and foliage bands in cement are found around the eaves and across the ground floor. Animals, some heraldic, decorate the walls. Two square bay windows are on the left hand (eastern) return front. A gabled porch with architrave surround and four-centred arch over the door in the gable end. A pentice extension is across the right hand (western) return front.

The western side of the building backs onto a bridle path.

=== Interior ===
The building is two storeys. The post-restoration layout has a kitchen immediately inside the front door on the home's northern side. The prominent chimney seen from outside services fireplaces in the kitchen, in the living/dining room at the southern end of the ground floor, and in one of the two bedrooms that make up the first floor.

As of Restoration Man's final visit (season 3, episode 14), renovations to the original structure were complete and the extension on the western side of the house, off the kitchen, had been built. While there was no bathroom in the building at the time of the final visit, the owners planned to finish installation of a bathroom in the building's extension in the following Spring.

== Gallery ==
Another shot of the gate lodge around 1900

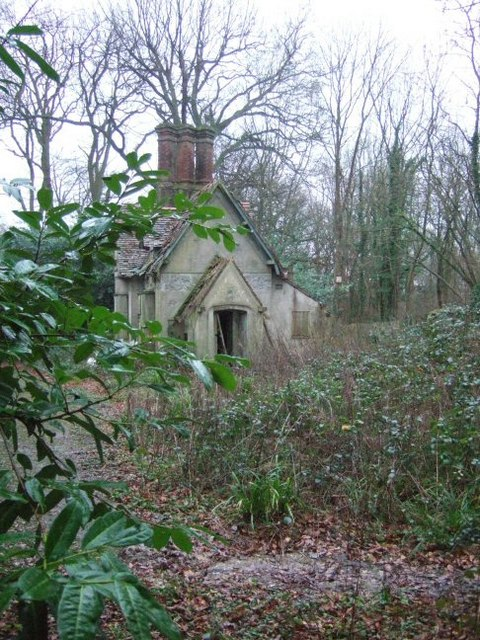
In 2007, three years before work on its restoration began and 46 years since it was last occupied. View from just inside the estate gates
