= Langthwaite Filter House =

Coordinates: 54.03735°N 2.76740°W

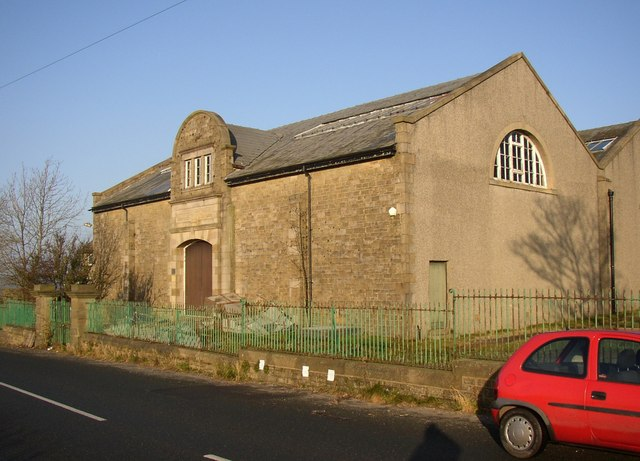
Filter House, Scotforth

The Langthwaite Filter House is a house in Langthwaite Road, Quernmore, Lancaster, England. There is also a filter house in Scotforth.

Restoration of the filter house was featured on an episode of the Channel 4 series The Restoration Man.
