= John Doran (writer) =

English editor and writer (1807–1878)

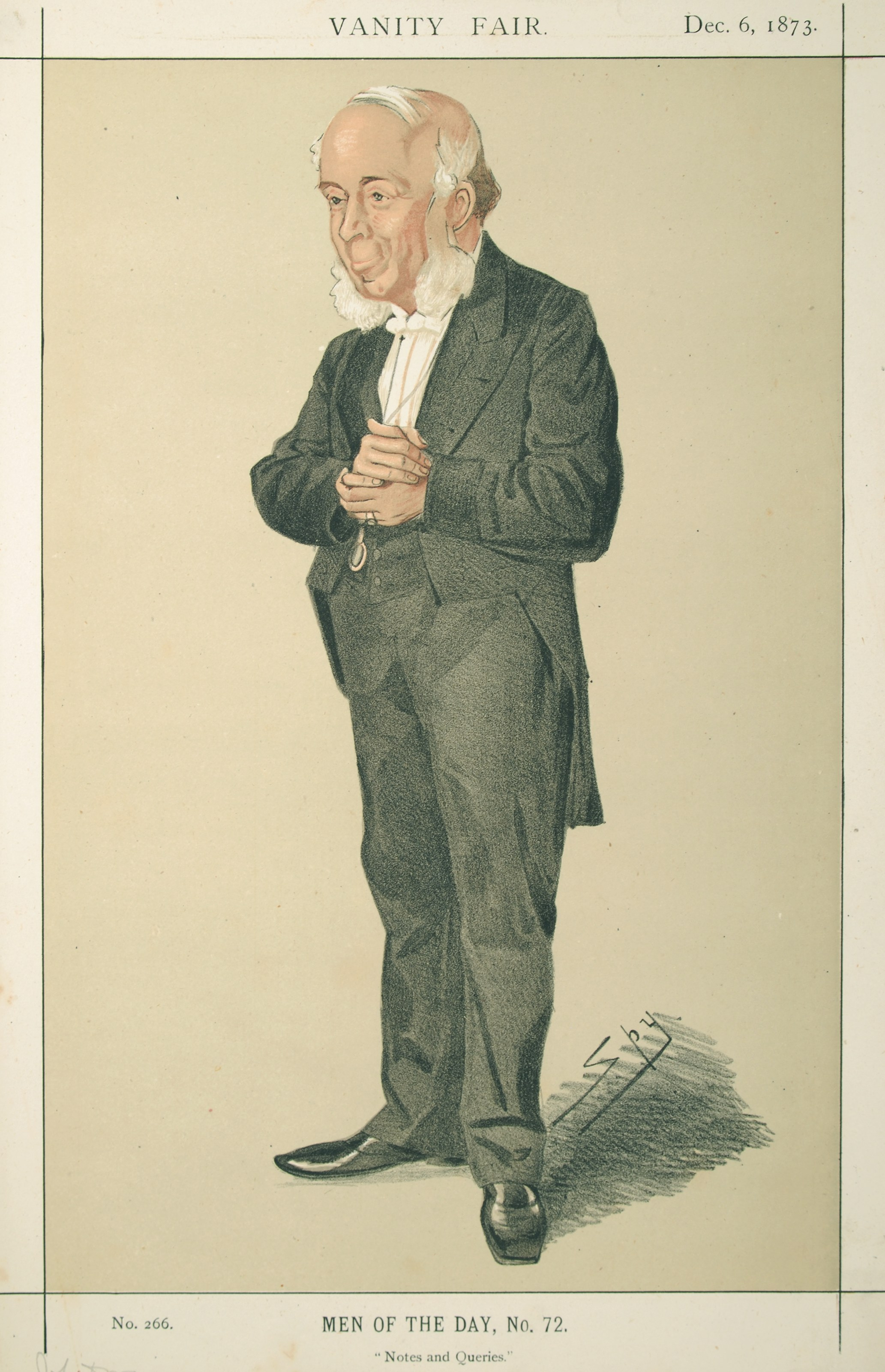
"Notes and Queries" Doran as caricatured by Spy (Leslie Ward) in Vanity Fair, December 1873

John Doran (11 March 1807 – 25 January 1878) was an English editor and miscellaneous writer of Irish parentage, wrote a number of works dealing with the lighter phases of manners, antiquities, and social history, often bearing punning titles, e.g., Table Traits with Something on Them (1854), and Knights and their Days. He edited Horace Walpole's Journal of the Reign of George III.. Among other posts, Doran was for a short time editor of The Athenaeum.

== Life ==
He was born in London on 11 March 1807. Both his parents were Irish: his father, John Doran, was a native of Drogheda, who after the Irish rebellion of 1798 went to England, and as a naval contractor was captured by the French. He was kept in France for three years, and acquired a knowledge of French, which he passed on to his son.

When very young John Doran was sent to Matheson's Academy in Margaret Street, Cavendish Square. Before he was seventeen he was an orphan. His knowledge of French earned for him in the early part of 1823 an appointment as tutor to the eldest son of James Murray, 1st Baron Glenlyon. He travelled on the continent for five years with his pupil George Murray. From 1828 to 1837 he was tutor to Lord Rivers, and to the sons of Lord Harewood and of Lord Portman.

After giving up his last tutorship, Doran travelled on the continent for two or three years, and took a doctor's degree in the faculty of philosophy at the University of Marburg in Prussia. Returning to England he became a professional writer, and settled in St. Peter's Square, Hammersmith. In 1841 he began as literary editor of the Church and State Gazette until 1852.

Soon afterwards he became a regular contributor to the Athenæum. He became closely connected with William Hepworth Dixon, the editor, and during Dixon's absences acted as his substitute. In August 1869, on the death of Sir Charles Wentworth Dilke, Doran for about a year succeeded Dixon as editor. On the retirement of William John Thoms, Doran was appointed to the editorship of Notes and Queries.

Doran died at Notting Hill on 25 January 1878, and was buried on 29 January at Kensal Green.

== Works ==
At the age of seventeen Doran wrote a melodrama Justice, or the Venetian Jew, which was on 8 April 1824 produced at the Surrey Theatre. Before leaving England Doran had begun writing on the London Literary Chronicle (absorbed in the Athenæum in 1828), and during his time abroad he became a regular contributor. A collection of his Parisian sketches and Paris letters appeared in 1828 under the title of Sketches and Reminiscences.

Doran began in 1830 to supply the Bath Journal with lyrical translations from the French, German, Latin, and Italian, two of his favourite authors being Béranger and Catullus. In 1835 he published the History of Reading.

In 1852 Doran published the memoir of Marie Thérèse Charlotte, Madame Royale, under the title of Filia Dolorosa. The first 115 pages had been written by Isabella Frances Romer, who died, leaving the fragment. In 1852 he also edited a new edition of Charles Anthon's text of the Anabasis of Xenophon. In 1853 he prefixed a life of Edward Young to a reissue of the Night Thoughts, rewritten in 1854 for Young's complete works.

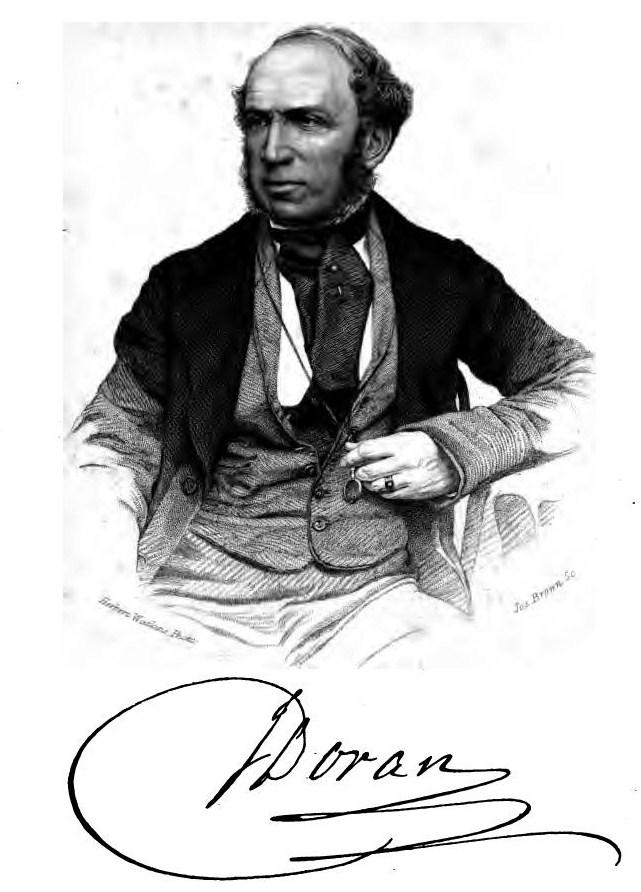
John Doran, portrait engraved by Joseph Brown from a photograph.

At the same period Doran began a series of popular works. In 1854 he published Table Traits and Something on Them and Habits and Men, both rich in anecdotes. In 1855 he published in 2 vols. The Queens of the House of Hanover. In 1856 appeared Knights and their Days. In 1857 Doran published, in 2 vols. a historical compilation entitled 'Monarchs retired from Business.' In 1858 he published his History of Court Fools, and edited the Bentley Ballads, which passed through several editions. In 1859 he produced New Pictures and Old Panels. Nearly at the same time he published for the first time from the original manuscripts, in 2 vols., The Last Journals of Horace Walpole.

In 1860 appeared Doran's Book of the Princes of Wales, and in 1861 his Memoir of Queen Adelaide. In 1860 Doran published his most elaborate work, Their Majesties' Servants, a history of the English stage, of which a new edition was issued in 1887, revised by Robert W. Lowe. Saints and Sinners, or in the Church and about it, appeared in 1868. In the same year he edited Henry Tuckerman's The Collector, a series of essays on books, newspapers, pictures, inns, authors, doctors, holidays, actors, and preachers. Immediately after the raising of the siege of Paris he brought out A Souvenir of the War of 1870–1.

In 1873 he published A Lady of the Last Century, on Elizabeth Montagu. Three years later he published, in 2 vols. Mann and Manners at the Court of Florence, 1740–86, based on the letters of Sir Horace Mann to Horace Walpole. Also in 2 vols. was London in the Jacobite Times(1877). Memories of our Great Towns, with Anecdotic Gleanings concerning their Worthies and their Oddities (1878) was a humorous volume. His final publication was produced as a serial contribution to Temple Bar, and published posthumously in 1885 as In and about Drury Lane, a kind of appendix to Their Majesties' Servants.

== Family ==
On 3 July 1834 he married at Reading Emma, the daughter of Captain Gilbert, R.N., and settled down for a time in Hay-a-Park Cottage, at Knaresborough. He left an only son, Alban Doran, F.R.C.S., and an only daughter, Florence, married to Andreas Holtz of Twyford Abbey, near Ealing.
