= Trevor Reeve =

Sir Charles Trevor Reeve (4 July 1915 – 7 December 1993) was a British barrister and High Court judge, who sat in the Family Division of the High Court from 1973 to 1988.

Reeve was the first instance judge in Miller v Jackson, which was memorably overruled by Lord Denning in the Court of Appeal.

His wife was the actress Marjorie Browne.
