= John Poynder =

English lawyer and theological writer

John Poynder (1779–1849) was an English lawyer and theological writer, best known for his Literary Extracts and as a proponent of Christian missions in India.

== Life ==
He was eldest son of a tradesman in the city of London; his mother belonged to the evangelical wing of the Church of England. He attended a school at Newington Butts, kept by Joseph Forsyth. He wanted in early life to undertake a career in the English church, but entered a solicitor's office.

For nearly forty years Poynder was clerk and solicitor to the royal hospitals of Bridewell and Bethlehem, and for three years he was under-sheriff of London and Middlesex.

== Activism ==
The Rev. William Jay was his lifelong friend. Moved by sermons of Jay and Claudius Buchanan, Poynder set himself to rouse proprietors of East India Company against the Company's religious tolerance. For many years he contended almost singlehanded in the court of proprietors at the East India House, for the prohibition of the custom of sati; the practice was stopped by Lord William Bentinck. Poynder also investigated the profits made by the company from worshippers and pilgrims at the temples of Jagannath, Gya and Allahabad.

== Death ==
Poynder died at Montpelier House, South Lambeth, on 10 March 1849. Poynder's library was sold by Sotheby & Co. on 10 Jan. 1850 and two following days. The collection included the Phænomena et Diosemeia of Aratus Solensis, with autograph and annotations of John Milton.

== Works ==
Poynder is best known for his Literary Extracts from English and other Works, collected during Half a Century, 1844, 2 vols.; a second series in one volume appeared in 1847. They contain observations by Richard Clark (1739–1831), the city chamberlain, on incidents in the political and social life of London. Poynder's own thoughts come under "Miscellaneous".

Poynder's other works relate mostly to his religious convictions. They include:

- ‘Christianity in India,’ 1813; a series of letters sent to the ‘Times’ under name of Laicus, with those of his opponent, ‘An East India Proprietor.’
- ‘Brief Account of the Jesuits’ (anon.) 1815; also included in the ‘Pamphleteer,’ vi. 99–145.
- ‘History of the Jesuits, with a Reply to Mr. Dallas's Defence of that Order’ (anon.), 1816, 2 vols.
- ‘Popery the Religion of Heathenism, being Letters of Ignotus in the “Times”’ (anon.), 1818; 2nd edit., with new title and author's name, 1835 (Halkett and Laing, Pseud. Literature, ii. 1973); on the publication of the second edition, called ‘Popery in alliance with Heathenism,’ Cardinal Wiseman addressed to him some printed letters of remonstrance.
- ‘The Church her own Enemy,’ 1818.
- ‘Human Sacrifices in India,’ substance of speech at the courts of the East India Company, 21 and 28 March,’ 1827.
- ‘Speech at Court of East India Company, 22 Sept. 1830, on its Encouragement of Idolatry,’ 1830.
- ‘Friendly Suggestions to those in Authority,’ 1831.
- ‘Life of Francis Spira,’ translated, 1832.
- ‘State of Ireland reconsidered, in answer to Lord Alvanley,’ 1841.
- ‘Word to the English Laity on Puseyism,’ 1843 (followed by ‘A second Word’ in 1848).
- ‘Idolatry in India: six Letters on the Continuance of the Payment to the Temple of Juggernaut,’ 1848.

Poynder contributed to the Christian Observer and the Church and State Gazette.

== Family ==
Poynder married at Clapham church, on 15 September 1807, Elizabeth Brown, who died at South Lambeth on 22 September 1845, aged 60. They had several sons and daughters. One of the sons, Frederick, graduated B.A. of Wadham College, Oxford, in 1838, and was later chaplain of Bridewell Hospital, and second master of Charterhouse School.
