= Honora Jenkins's will =

Case in English law

Honora Jenkins having a power, though covert, to make a writing in the nature of a will, ordered the will to be prepared, and went to her attorney’s office to execute it. Being asthmatical, and the office very hot, she retired to her carriage to execute the will, the witnesses attending her: after having seen the execution, they returned into the office to attest it, and the carriage was...put back to the window of the office, through which, it was sworn by a person in the carriage, the testatrix might see what passed; immediately after the attestation, the witnesses took the will to her, and one of them delivered it to her, telling her they had attested it; upon which she folded it up and put it into her pocket. The Lord Chancellor inclined very strongly to think the will well executed...

— Lord Chancellor Thurlow, Casson v. Dade (1781) 1 Bro.C.C. 99

The 1778 case of Honora Jenkins's last will and testament is a case in English law dealing with the witnessing of a testator's will. In this case, the testatrix, Honora Jenkins, visited her solicitors' office to sign her will, but it was later recorded how "being asthmatical and the office very hot, she retired to her carriage to execute the will", which was outside the office window.

== Background ==
English law at that time required that a testator's signature "shall be made or acknowledged by the testator in the presence of two or more witnesses present at the same time". Jenkins's maidservant testified to the court that, specifically, "the moment the witnesses were signing the carriage horses reared up, causing the carriage to move into a line of sight with the office window". Thus she believed that, had Jenkins looked up at that moment, she would have been able to see the attestation take place.

== Casson v. Dade ==
On the grounds that she had not been in the same room as her witness at the point of signing, the will was challenged in court. However, in the following judgment, Casson v. Dade of 1781, it was decided that the requirement was specifically that the parties were able to observe each other, and the fact that Jenkins had been able to look in the window of the office from her coach was deemed sufficient to fulfil the requirements of law. The precedent has also been established in US law.

== 21st century ==
In 2005, Senior Judge Denzil Lush judged that two parties could be deemed to be observant of each other even though the parties were in separate rooms, on the grounds that a glass door separated them and that this enabled a line of sight between them. The legal scholar Catherine Rendell has described the case as an "extreme example" of the line of sight doctrine, being specifically concerned with defining presence "with regard to the testator being present when the witnesses signed, rather than the witnesses being present when the testator signed". (Note: This contrasts, says Rendell, with a situation in which witnesses and testator are in the same room, but the former do not know what the latter is doing, their attestation becomes invalidated.)

The case became of renewed relevance in the legal Anglosphere during the COVID-19 pandemic following the introduction of lockdown policies. MoneyWeek, for example, wrote that "lockdown makes writing a will almost impossible". Likewise, the Financial Times noted that the requirement for the testator to sign in the presence of witnesses "is inconsistent with rigorous self-isolation". Governmental advice was usually for individuals to remain a certain distance apart to restrict the spread of the virus; however, this also had implications for the witnessing of testaments. The New York Times noted that "England's influential will-making traditions have stood still", and that there was an increasing pressure for the strictures surrounding will-making to be loosened. The 1837 act had been designed, in a time when few were literate, to ensure that witnesses were available to prevent the defrauding of testators. The rediscovery, however, of Jenkins's case enabled individuals to witness wills without the concomitant proximity of attending a legal office: as a result of her case, said The New York Times, it was confirmed that "witnessing a will through a window was legal", although the Financial Times urged caution upon those who did: "relying on a precedent that pre-dates the French Revolution would potentially make wills signed and witnessed in this way open to challenge".
