= Bolton v Stone =

Leading British House of Lords case in the tort of negligence

Bolton v. Stone [1951] AC 850, [1951] 1 All ER 1078 is a leading House of Lords case in the tort of negligence, establishing that a defendant is not negligent if the damage to the plaintiff was not a reasonably foreseeable consequence of his conduct. The plaintiff was hit by a cricket ball which had been hit out of the ground; the defendants were members of the club committee.

== Facts ==
On 9 August 1947, during a game of cricket against the Cheetham 2nd XI at Cheetham Cricket Ground in Manchester, a batsman from the visiting team hit the ball for six. The ball flew out of the ground, hitting the claimant, Miss Stone, who was standing outside her house in Cheetham Hill Road, approximately 100 yards (91 m) from the batsman.

The club had been playing cricket at the ground since 1864, before the road was built in 1910. The ground was surrounded by a 12-foot (3.7 m) fence, but the ground sloped up so the fence was 17 feet (5.2 m) above the level of the pitch where the ball passed, about 78 yards (71 m) from the batsman. There was evidence that a ball had been hit that far out of the ground only very rarely, about six times in the last 30 years, although people living closer to the ground reported that balls were hit out of the ground a few times each season.

The claimant argued that the ball being hit so far even once was sufficient to give the club warning that there was a risk of injuring a passer-by, fixing it with liability in negligence for the plaintiff's injuries. The claimant also claimed under the principle in Rylands v Fletcher, that the ball was a dangerous item that had "escaped" from the cricket ground, and in nuisance.

== Judgment ==
=== High Court ===
Oliver, J., heard the case at first instance in the Manchester Michaelmas Assizes on 15 December 1948. He delivered a short judgment on 20 December 1948, dismissing each ground of the claimant's case, holding that there was no evidence of any injury in the previous 38 years, so there was no negligence; Rylands v Fletcher was not applicable; and a single act of hitting a cricket ball onto a road was too isolated a happening to amount to a nuisance.

=== Court of Appeal ===
The claimant's appeal was heard in the Court of Appeal on 13 October and 14 October 1949, and judgment was delivered by on 2 November 1949. All three judges, Somervell, Singleton and Jenkins LJJ, dismissed nuisance on the same grounds as Oliver J. Somervell LJ, dissenting, held that the claimant had failed to establish that the defendants had not taken due and reasonable care, so was not negligent either. However, the majority, Singleton and Jenkins LJJ, held that an accident of this sort called for an explanation, and that the defendants were aware of the potential risk. On that basis, applying the legal maxim of res ipsa loquitur, the defendants were found negligent.

The defendants appealed to the House of Lords.

=== House of Lords ===
The House of Lords heard argument on 5 March and 6 March 1951, delivering their judgment on 10 May 1951.

The House of Lords (Lord Porter, Lord Normand, Lord Oaksey, Lord Reid and Lord Radcliffe) unanimously found that there was no negligence, although most considered it a close call based on whether the reasonable person would foresee this as anything more than an extremely remote risk. Most of the Lords agreed that the key issue was that of making the key question one of determining the fact of what the reasonable person would have in mind regarding assumption of this risk. This was not considered to be a point of law, which is the province of judges, but a factual question, which may also be determined by a jury. In this case the risk was considered (just) too remote for the reasonable person, in spite of the observation by Lord Porter that hitting a ball out of the ground was an objective of the game, "and indeed, one which the batsman would wish to bring about". The Lords believed there were policy implications in terms of the message of what liability would have meant in creating restrictions in what we can do in our everyday lives in an urbanised modern society.

In words of Lord Atkin in Donoghue v Stevenson, "You must take reasonable care to avoid acts or omissions which you can reasonably foresee would be likely to injure your neighbour." Whether the defendant had a duty to the claimant to take precautions to take into account the foreseeability of the risk and the cost of measures to prevent the risk. The risk in this case may have been foreseeable, but it was so highly improbable that a reasonable person could not have anticipated the harm to the claimant and would not have taken any action to avoid it. In the words of Lord Normand, "It is not the law that precautions must be taken against every peril that can be foreseen by the timorous."

== Other cases ==
By way of contrast, a cricket club was guilty of negligence and nuisance in a later case, Miller v Jackson, where neighbours of the club were hit by cricket balls several times each season. Similarly, in the earlier case of Castle v St Augustine's Links, cited in Bolton v Stone, the defendant golf club was liable in nuisance for damage caused by golf balls repeatedly hit out of the club.

However, The Wagon Mound (No 2) shows that the case does not establish a principle that small risks can be ignored, but rather that the risk must be balanced against the defendant's purpose in carrying on its activities and the practicability and cost of taking precautions.

=== Comparison with US law ===
New York state's highest court in Rinaldo v. McGovern (1991) ruled that two golfers, one of whom hit a golf ball which struck the plaintiff's automobile, were not liable to the plaintiff. The court opined that golf is a game in which even the most skilled players cannot avoid hitting shots off target on some occasion, and a player would be liable for a mis-hit ball only if the player had "aimed so inaccurately as to unreasonably increase the risk of harm."

Further Reading:
