= The Restoration Man =

- Genre: Home improvement
- Presented by: George Clarke
- Country of origin: United Kingdom
- Original language: English
- No. of series: 7
- No. of episodes: 45

Production
- Running time: 60 minutes
- Production company: Tiger Aspect Productions

Original release
- Network: Channel 4
- Release: 14 March 2010 – 23 March 2017

The Restoration Man is a British home improvement television series presented by George Clarke. It first aired on Channel 4 on 14 March 2010.

== Synopsis ==
Architect George Clarke travels around Great Britain profiling people restoring historically and architecturally significant buildings. The series typically features people aiming to convert non-residential structures – including churches, water towers and windmills – into homes. Each episode chronicles the difficulties the owners face during the conversion, including restrictions in place for listed buildings. Clarke researches each building's history and architecture, interviews people who previously lived or worked there, and shares his findings with the new owners.

== Episodes ==
=== Series 1 ===
Episode	Title	Location	Directed by	Original release date	Structure Type
1	"Bath Lodge"	Ormskirk, Lancashire	Jenny Byrom	21 March 2010	folly
The series begins with a Gothic Revival folly in Lancashire that was rumoured to be a bath lodge.
2	"Llanreithan Church"	Haverfordwest, Pembrokeshire	Jenny Byrom	28 March 2010	church
Gareth and Jill Williams buy a disused medieval church in Wales. The 15th-century building must first be excavated by archaeologists – with the Williams covering the cost at £600 a day.
3	"Melin Newydd Windmill"	Anglesey	Jenny Byrom	4 April 2010	windmill
Clive, an electrical engineer, aims to restore an 1833 windmill on the island of Anglesey and turn it into a vacation home for him and his wife, Jane, who is recovering from cancer. Problems include rotting beams and damage from storms, and Clive's motivation wanes when Jane's cancer returns.
4	"Towers"	Kent / East Renfrewshire	Lionel Mill	11 April 2010	Martello tower / Keep
Clarke visits with two people set on restoring two old towers: a Martello tower in Kent and the 15th-century Caldwell Tower in Scotland.
5	"Field House"	Pilling, Lancashire	Lionel Mill	18 April 2010	cottage
A couple work to restore a 17th-century cruck-framed fieldhouse into a home for their combined family, and ask George Clarke to design the extension. The structure is surprisingly not listed, but they still need permission from the local council, which rejects their plan for the extension.
6	"Thorington Gate Lodge"	Thorington, Suffolk	Lionel Mill	25 April 2010	gatehouse
Retired boxer Scott Welch rescues a gate lodge, the only remaining building on a demolished country estate.
7	"Coach House"	Hankham, East Sussex	Lionel Mill	2 May 2010	carriage house
Lisa and Darren Walker convert a Grade II-listed 18th-century coach house into a home. Converting agricultural structures requires special consideration, as these buildings typically have never had water or electricity.
8	"Ice House"	Crinan, Argyll and Bute	Lionel Mill	9 May 2010	ice house
Laird Henderson restores an 1833 ice house, used in the booming western Scottish salmon industry. Clarke visits Petworth House to see an extravagant 18th-century ice house, built solely for the Duke of Somerset's family to indulge in ice cream.
9	"Medieval Hall and Mansion"	Cardiff / Aberystwyth	Lionel Mill	16 May 2010	hall house / mansion

=== Series 2 ===
Episode	Title	Location	Directed by	Original release date	Structure Type
1	"Reeds Windmill"	Kingston, Kent	Emma Slack	5 January 2012	windmill
A couple, Pete and Nikki, attempt to restore a windmill that has been in Pete's family for a century. However, midway through the conversion, Nikki is diagnosed with terminal cancer and given months to live.
2	"Congleton Water Tower"	Congleton, Cheshire	Emma Slack	12 January 2012	water tower
3	"Gothic Church"	Gamblesby, Cumbria	Jonathan Barker	19 January 2012	church
A couple take on the restoration of a 19th-century Victorian Church. To save money, their brother-in-law acts as project manager, but he's inexperienced with restoration. Meanwhile the bank denies their request for an additional mortgage, and extreme weather causes problems.
4	"Engine House"	Uffington, Oxfordshire	Emma Slack	26 January 2012	brickworks
A couple renovate a 19th-century brickworks, the only remaining building from what was once a thriving Victorian industry in the village.
5	"Towers Revisit"	Kent / East Renfrewshire	Emma Slack	2 February 2012	Martello tower, Keep
Clarke returns to the towers in Kent and Scotland (Caldwell Tower), neither of which had received planning approval during his first visit.
6	"Medieval Hall"	Cardiff, Glamorgan	Emma Slack	9 February 2012	hall house
7	"Settle Water Tower"	Settle, North Yorkshire	Jonathan Barker	16 February 2012	water tower
Mark and Pat Rand convert an 1876 water tower into a residence. The Grade II-listed water tower lies on the historic Settle-Carlisle Line and has been out of use since the 1960s.
8	"Llanreithan Church Revisit"	Haverfordwest, Pembrokeshire	Rob Farquar	19 June 2012	church
9	"Bath Lodge Revisit"	Ormskirk, Lancashire	Oliver Wilson	16 August 2012	folly
10	"Ice House Revisit"	Crinan, Argyll and Bute, Scotland	Oliver Wilson	23 August 2012	ice house
11	"Gothic Church Revisit"	Gamblesby, Cumbria	Oliver Wilson	27 August 2012	church

=== Series 3 ===
Episode	Title	Location	Directed by	Original release date	Structure Type
1	"Finchcocks Oast"	Riseden, Kent	Unknown	27 December 2012	oast house
2	"Telford Church"	Berneray, Outer Hebrides	Unknown	3 January 2013	church
A Newcastle couple, Keith and Sheenagh McIntyre, hope to restore a ruined church designed by Thomas Telford on the small island of Berneray, and turn it into an art studio and vacation home. Only the stone walls are left of the church, built in 1829. The extreme weather causes problems as strong winds shred the insulation and blows debris all over the island, angering local residents, and the McIntyres are dealt a major blow as the custom windows ordered from a Scandinavian company don't fit.
3	"Longhurst Lodge"	Cranleigh, Surrey	Unknown	10 January 2013	gatehouse
A couple renovate a tiny Victorian gatehouse.
4	"Thrum Mill"	Rothbury, Northumberland	Unknown	17 January 2013	watermill
Dave and Margaret Hedley take on an old mill, which they plan to not only restore, but get working again to generate hydroelectric power for the house. Clarke discovers the first mills on the River Coquet were built by the Earl of Northumberland to earn income to pay his steep fine after he was accused of conspiring in the Gunpowder Plot.
5	"Pig Barn"	Rufford Abbey, Nottinghamshire	Oliver Wilson	24 January 2013	barn
A retired couple renovate a dilapidated pig barn that formerly belonged to Rufford Abbey.
6	"Settle Water Tower Revisit"	Settle, North Yorkshire	Jonathan Barker	31 January 2013	water tower

=== Series 4 ===
Episode	Title	Location	Directed by	Original release date	Structure Type
1	"Pumping Station"	Cheshunt, Hertfordshire	Larry Walford	7 January 2014	pumping station
Alison and Matthew Grey sell their London flat to buy an 1888 Victorian pumping station in Hertfordshire. After spending £750,000 to buy the station, they are left with a budget of only £60,000.
2	"Flint Mill"	Stone, Staffordshire	Larry Walford	14 January 2014	mill
Alan and Dora Appleby, who are experienced with restoring listed buildings, decide to restore a dilapidated flint mill into a retirement home. However, the cost of restoring the 18th-century mill ends up much higher than the Applebys had budgeted.
3	"Fisherman's Church"	Brixham, Devon	Larry Walford	21 January 2014	church
Neil and Jackie attempt to convert an abandoned church into their family home. The church, built in 1874 and deconsecrated in 1977, has suffered water damage over the years and needs a new roof.
4	"Welsh School"	Pencader, Carmarthenshire	Larry Walford	28 January 2014	schoolhouse
A couple experienced in restoration take on a derelict school. With little money in the budget, they plan on doing the renovation themselves, and ultimately stretch themselves to the limit. Meanwhile, Clarke looks into the school's history and organises a reunion of its former students and teachers.
5	"Cow Barn"	Wellington, Herefordshire	Larry Walford	5 February 2014	barn
A young couple with no experience in restoration try to renovate a Grade II-listed barn that dates from the late 17th/early 18th century.
6	"RAF Bunker"	Watnall, Nottinghamshire	Jonathan Barker	12 February 2014	bunker
Jamie and Jane Brown buy a World War II bunker to convert into a bed and breakfast. The bunker, which has been empty for more than 50 years, has no electricity or windows, and is flooded.
7	"Telford Church Revisit"	Berneray, Outer Hebrides	Larry Walford	19 February 2014	church
Clarke returns to Berneray to catch up with Keith and Sheenagh McIntyre, and discovers their renovation won a prestigious award from the Royal Incorporation of Architects in Scotland.
8	"Thrum Mill Revisit"	Rothbury, Northumberland	Larry Walford	26 February 2014	mill
Clarke returns to Northumberland to see the 17th-century mill restored by Dave and Margaret Hedley, who now have the mill running again to provide power.

=== Series 5 ===
Episode	Title	Location	Directed by	Original release date	Structure Type
1	"Shropshire Farmhouse"	Wem, Shropshire	Lawrence Walford	7 January 2015	farmhouse
First-time restorers Russell and Nadia Smith renovate a Grade II-listed farmhouse on a tight budget. George Clarke tries to date the property, that has a timber-frame back, typical of the 16th and 17th centuries, and a Georgian brick front typical of the 18th and 19th centuries.
2	"Tudor Revival School"	Great Braxted, Essex	Lawrence Walford	14 January 2015	schoolhouse
Jim and Bee Goody purchase a 19th-century schoolhouse to convert into a country home. Jim is frustrated by the restrictions on the Grade II-listed property, and they're forced to max their credit cards to get by when their old house doesn't sell.
3	"HMS Owl"	Fearn Airfield, Ross and Cromarty	Larry Walford	21 January 2015	airfield tower
A couple takes on a very unusual renovation project: restoring an air traffic control tower from a World War II airfield. Clarke tracks down veterans who trained for combat missions at the airfield.
4	"Pannal Water Tower"	Pannal, North Yorkshire	Larry Wolford	28 January 2015	water tower
Carol and Majid Nadry buy an unusual water tower in Yorkshire. The building is not listed, but the property's "ransom strip" proves costly: £70,000.
5	"Longhurst Lodge Revisit"	Cranleigh, Surrey	Emma Slack, Jonathan Barker, and Oliver Wilson	4 February 2015	gatehouse
6	"Welsh School Revisit"	Pencader, Carmarthenshire	Lawrence Walford	11 February 2015	schoolhouse

=== Series 6 ===
Episode	Title	Location	Directed by	Original release date	Structure Type
1	"Baptist Church"	Oxenhope, West Yorkshire	Robert Marsden	7 January 2016	Church
Colin and Emma Hewes convert a disused Edwardian church into a family home.
2	"Victorian Railway Station"	Northumberland	Oliver Wilson and Larry Walford	14 January 2016	Railway Station
George joins Lee Head, who is attempting to convert a Victorian railway station in Northumberland into his family home.
3	"Georgian Gazebo Tower"	Pembroke	Robert Marsden	21 January 2016	Gazebo tower
George Clarke is in Pembrokeshire to help restore a Georgian Gazebo Tower and make it a livable property.
4	"Methodist Church and Sunday School"	Harrogate	Robert Marsden	28 January 2016	Church and sunday school
George Clarke helps a couple in Harrogate convert two crumbling church buildings into a pair of beautiful homes.
5	"Harrogate Revisit 2016"	Pannal, Harrogate	Larry Walford	31 March 2016	Water Tower
George Clarke returns to Harrogate to see how Carol and Majid Nadry have finished converting their brick water tower into their dream home

=== Series 7 ===
Episode	Title	Location	Directed by	Original release date	Structure Type
1	"Berkshire Pumping Station"	Newbury, Berkshire	Unknown	5 January 2017	Pumping Station
Young couple Steven Crame and Marina Bacchelli transform a 1930s pumping station into a modern four-bed home.
2	"Cheshire Water Tower"	Cheshire	Larry Wolford	12 January 2017	Water Tower
A Cheshire couple turn an 85 foot art deco water tower into a six-storey house
3	"Lancashire Water Filtration Plant"	Lancaster, Lancashire	Unknown	19 January 2017	Water Filtration Plant
Matt Whittle and his father-in-law-to-be Mike Readfern pool their resources to convert an enormous water filtration plant into a pair of semi-detached houses sharing an internal garden atrium
4	"Church Hall Barn 2017"	Broxted, Essex	Robert Marsden	26 January 2017	Church Hall Barn
Jude McKelvey wants to restore a dilapidated but listed 17th-century barn to its former glory, while also creating a family home to share with her two boys
5	"Methodist Church & Sunday School (Revisited)"	Harrogate, North Yorkshire	Highend on the World	23 March 2017	Methodist Church
