= Roualeyn Hovell-Thurlow-Cumming-Bruce, 9th Baron Thurlow =

British peer (born 1952)

The Right Honourable The Lord Thurlow
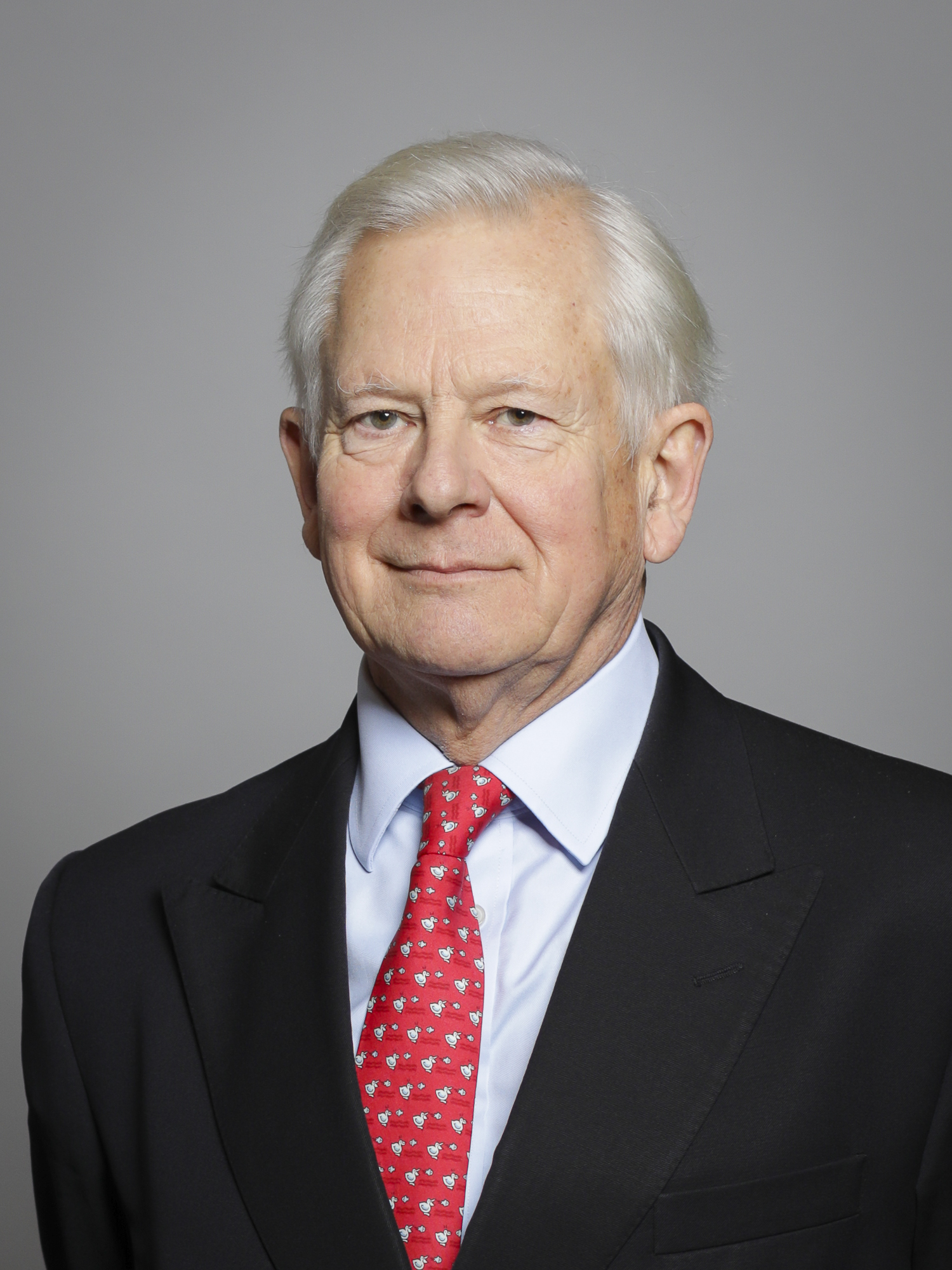
- Official portrait, 2019

Member of the House of Lords
- Lord Temporal
- Elected Hereditary Peer; 6 February 2015 – 29 April 2026
- By-election: 2015
- Preceded by: The 2nd Baron Chorley

Personal details
- Born: Roualeyn Robert Hovell-Thurlow-Cumming-Bruce; 13 April 1952 (age 74)
- Party: Crossbench

Roualeyn Robert Hovell-Thurlow-Cumming-Bruce, 9th Baron Thurlow (born 13 April 1952), is a British hereditary peer and chartered surveyor and a former member of the House of Lords who sat as a crossbencher.

Coats of arms of the barons Thurlow

He was elected to sit in the House at a crossbench hereditary peers' by-election on 3 February 2015, following the resignation of Lord Chorley.

He married Bridget Anne Julia Ismay Cheape on 5 May 1980, the daughter of Hugh Bruce Ismay Cheape, of Fossoway Lodge, Kinross. They have four children:

- The Hon. Nicholas Edward Hovell-Thurlow-Cumming-Bruce (born 1986);
- The Hon. Iona Tessa Bridget Hovell-Thurlow-Cumming-Bruce (born 1987);
- The Hon. George Patrick Roualeyn Hovell-Thurlow-Cumming-Bruce (born 1990);
- The Hon. Lorna Belinda Hovell-Thurlow-Cumming-Bruce (born 1991).

His ancestors include Mary Catherine Bolton (1791–1840), a notable actress, and her husband, Edward Hovell-Thurlow, 2nd Baron Thurlow (1781–1829), a minor poet.

Peerage of Great Britain
Preceded by Francis Hovell-Thurlow- Cumming-Bruce	Baron Thurlow; 2013–present	Incumbent; Heir apparent: Hon. Nicholas Hovell-Thurlow- Cumming-Bruce
Parliament of the United Kingdom
Preceded by The Lord Chorley	Elected hereditary peer to the House of Lords under the House of Lords Act 1999; 2015–2026	Position abolished under the House of Lords (Hereditary Peers) Act 2026
