= Church and State Gazette =

English weekly newspaper

The Church and State Gazette was an English weekly newspaper, published from 1842 to 1856. Its editorial line was conservative and Anglican. It was, however, considered more moderate than the English Churchman and The Guardian, the leading High Church papers.

Its staff included John Wilks the younger, the swindler, editor in the early 1840s, and John Doran, literary editor.
