= Edward Hovell-Thurlow, 2nd Baron Thurlow =

Edward Hovell-Thurlow, 2nd Baron Thurlow (1781–1829), was the 2nd Baron Thurlow, known also as a poet. In 1814 he assumed by royal licence the additional surname of Hovell, in commemoration of his ancestor Sir Richard Hovell.

== Life ==
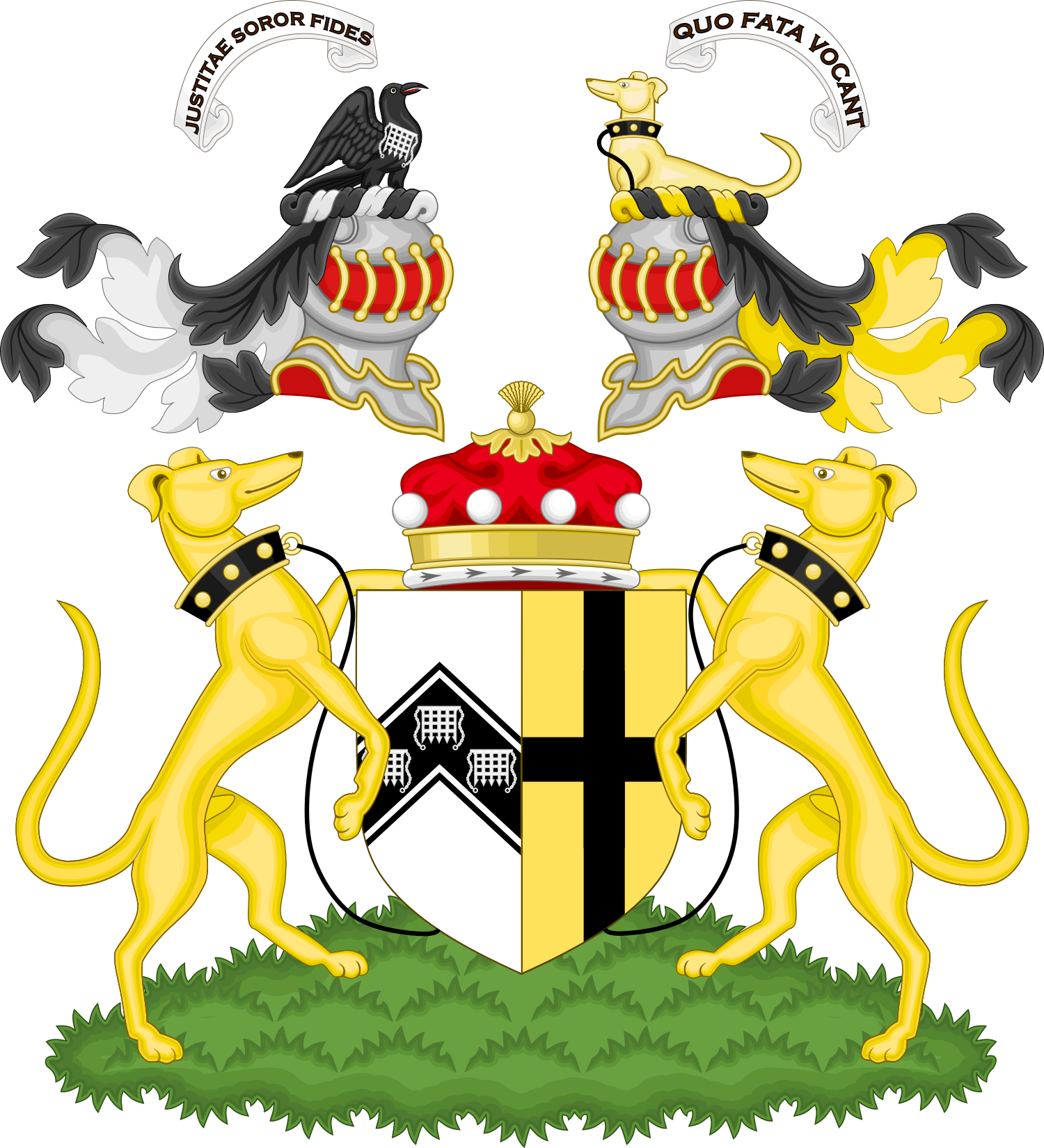
Coats of Arms of Edward Hovell-Thurlow

He was the eldest son of Thomas Thurlow, the bishop of Durham, and Anne, daughter of William Bere of Lymington, Hampshire; and nephew of Lord Chancellor Thurlow. Born in the Temple, London, on 10 June 1781, he was educated at Charterhouse School and Magdalen College, Oxford, where he matriculated on 17 May 1798, and was created M.A. on 16 July 1801.

On the death of his uncle the 1st Baron, he succeeded to the barony of Thurlow, of Thurlow in Suffolk, on 12 September 1806; but took his seat in the House of Lords only on 29 November 1810. In commemoration of the descent of his grandmother from Richard Hovell, esquire of the body to Henry V, he prefixed to Thurlow the additional surname Hovell by royal licence, dated 8 July 1814.

Thurlow had been appointed on 30 December 1785 one of the principal registrars of the diocese of Lincoln, and in 1788 clerk of the custodies of idiots and lunatics. To those offices were added those of clerk of the presentations in the petty bag office (1796), patentee of commissions in bankruptcy (1803), and clerk of the Hanaper (1821). He retained them all, until his death at Brighton on 4 June 1829.

== Works ==
Thurlow edited for private circulation, London, 1810, Sir Philip Sidney's Defence of Poesy; with it were some original sonnets. They were reprinted, with Hermilda, in the manner of Tasso, as Verses on several Occasions, London, 1812; second enlarged edition entitled Poems on several Occasions, 1813. Other works were:

- Ariadne: a poem in three parts, Carmen Britannicum, in honour of the Prince Regent, and The Doge's Daughter: a poem, with translations from Anacreon and Horace, all published at London in 1814;
- Select Poems, privately printed at Chiswick in 1821; and
- Angelica, or the Rape of Proteus, a continuation of The Tempest by Shakespeare, 1822.

He contributed to the Gentleman's Magazine, in which appeared (April 1813) his Lines on Rogers's Epistle to a Friend, parodied by Lord Byron. Thomas Moore criticised his affectation in 1814.

== Family ==
Thurlow married, at St Martin-in-the-Fields on 13 November 1813, the actress Mary Catherine Bolton (died 1830), eldest daughter of James Richard Bolton, an attorney. They had three sons, of whom Edward Thomas succeeded his father in the title.

Peerage of Great Britain
Preceded by Edward Thurlow	Baron Thurlow; 1806–1829; Member of the House of Lords (1810–1829)	Succeeded by Edward Hovell-Thurlow
