= Edward Thurlow, 1st Baron Thurlow =

18th-century British lawyer and Tory politician

The Right Honourable The Lord Thurlow PC
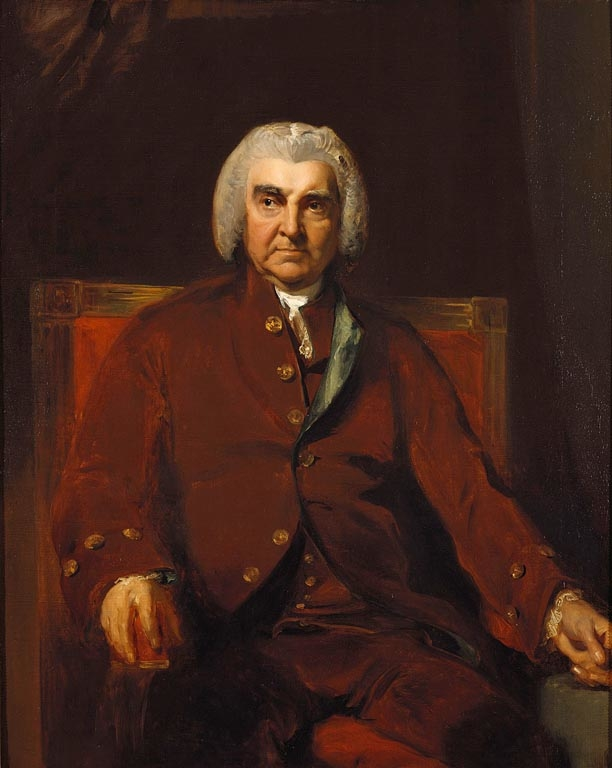
- Portrait of Lord Thurlow by Thomas Lawrence, 1803

Lord Chancellor Lord High Steward for the trial of: List: Warren Hastings
- In office 3 June 1778 – 7 April 1783
- Monarch: George III
- Prime Minister: The Lord North; The Marquess of Rockingham; The Earl of Shelburne
- Preceded by: The Earl Bathurst
- Succeeded by: In Commission
- In office 23 December 1783 – 15 June 1792
- Monarch: George III
- Prime Minister: William Pitt the Younger
- Preceded by: In Commission
- Succeeded by: In Commission

Member of Parliament for Tamworth
- In office 1765–1778
- Preceded by: Viscount Villiers
- Succeeded by: Anthony Chamier

Personal details
- Born: 9 December 1731
- Died: 12 September 1806 (aged 74)
- Party: Tories

Edward Thurlow, 1st Baron Thurlow, PC (9 December 1731 – 12 September 1806), was a British lawyer and Tory politician who sat in the House of Commons from 1765 to 1778 when he was raised to the peerage as Baron Thurlow. He served as Lord High Chancellor of Great Britain for fourteen years and under four Prime Ministers.

== Early life ==
Born at Bracon Ash, Norfolk, Thurlow was the eldest son of Reverend Thomas Thurlow. Thomas Thurlow, Bishop of Durham, was his brother. He studied at King's School, Canterbury and at Gonville and Caius College, Cambridge. However, he was forced to leave Cambridge in 1751 without a degree after coming into conflict with the authorities of the university. He was for some time articled to a solicitor in Lincoln's Inn, but in 1754 he was called to the Bar, Inner Temple. After a slow start, Thurlow eventually established a successful legal practice. He was made a King's Counsel in 1761 and was elected a bencher of the Inner Temple in 1762.

== Political career ==
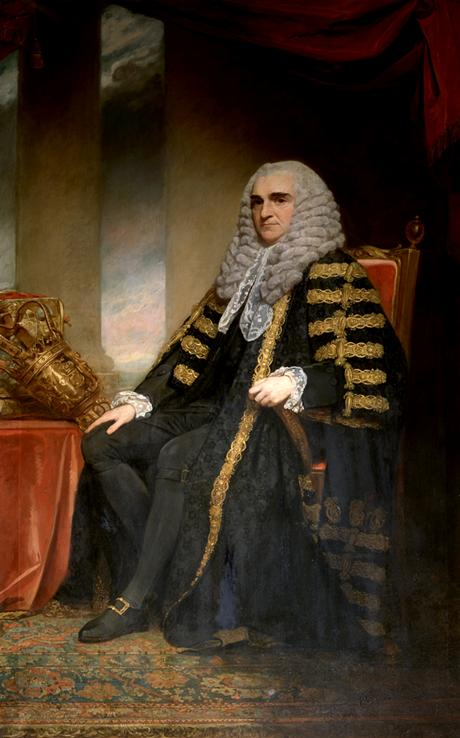
Lord Chancellor Thurlow

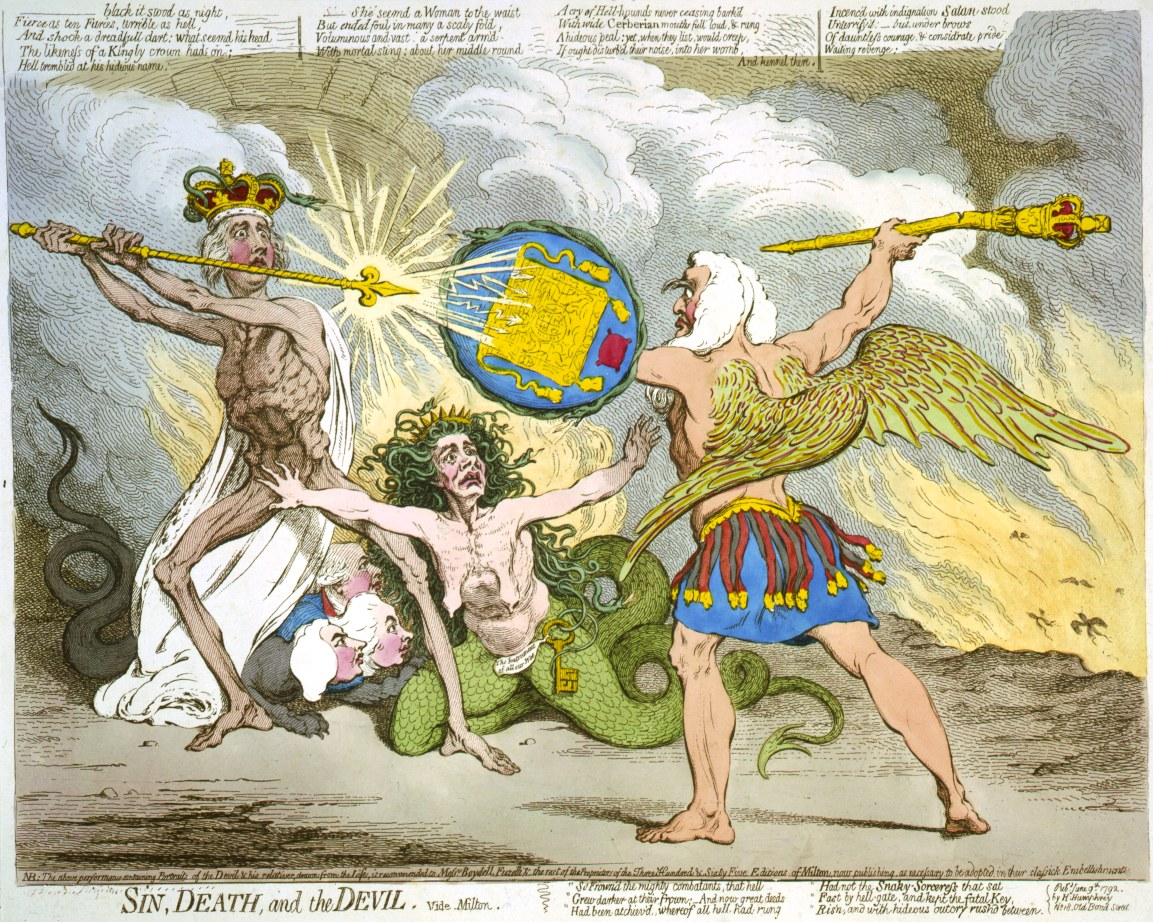
In Sin, Death, and the Devil (1792), James Gillray caricatured the political battle between Pitt (Death) and Thurlow (Satan), with Queen Charlotte (Sin) in the middle, protecting Pitt.

Thurlow then turned to politics, and in 1768 he was elected Member of Parliament for Tamworth as a Tory. Two years later, as a recognition of his defence the previous January of the expulsion of John Wilkes he was appointed Solicitor-General in the government of Lord North. He held this post for a little under a year, chiefly involved in the prosecution of libels and limitations on the freedom of the press, until he was promoted to Attorney General in January 1771. He was to remain in this office for seven years, during which period he became known as an ardent opponent of the American colonists' struggle for independence. He is noted for his defeat in the case of Woodfall, who was publisher of the Letters of Junius, upon which a verdict of mistrial was entered by Lord Mansfield.

In 1778 Thurlow was admitted to the Privy Council, raised to the peerage as Baron Thurlow, of Ashfield in the County of Suffolk, and appointed Lord Chancellor by Lord North, taking his seat on 14 July 1778. In this post he notably opposed the economical and constitutional reforms proposed by Edmund Burke and John Dunning. The Tory administration of Lord North fell in March 1782, after twelve years in office. The Whigs under Lord Rockingham came to power, but Thurlow managed to cling on as Lord Chancellor. Rockingham died in July 1782, but Thurlow remained Lord Chancellor also when Lord Shelburne became prime minister. The latter government fell in April 1783, when a coalition government under Charles James Fox and Lord North was formed (with the Duke of Portland as titular prime minister). Thurlow was not invited to resume the role of Lord Chancellor, and instead the Great Seal was put into commission. He went into opposition and contributed to the downfall of the coalition in December 1783. William Pitt the Younger became prime minister and reinstated Thurlow as Lord Chancellor. The relationship between Pitt and Thurlow was always fragile, and Thurlow often relied on his friendship with King George III to be able to remain in office. He opposed a bill for the restoration to the heirs of estates forfeited in the Jacobite rising of 1745. Partly to please the king, he consistently and strongly supported Warren Hastings, and negotiated with the Whigs to ensure his continued power in the event of a change of government. In 1792, when he attacked Pitt's bill to establish a fund to redeem the national debt, he was finally dismissed.

== Later life ==
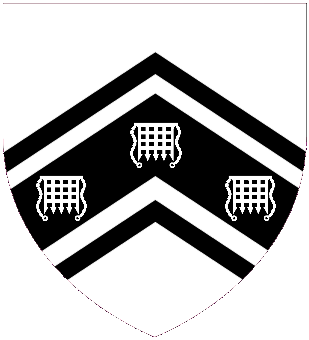
Argent on a chevron cottised Sable three portcullises of the field.

As a way of compensation, Thurlow was given a second peerage as Baron Thurlow, of Thurlow in the County of Suffolk, with remainder to his three nephews and their heirs male. He was never to hold office again and retired into private life. However, in 1797 he intrigued for the formation of a government from which Pitt and Fox should be excluded, and in which the Earl of Moira should be prime minister and himself Lord Chancellor. Despite the tacit support of the Prince of Wales the enterprise failed. His last recorded appearance in the House of Lords was in 1802.

Thomas Creevey described Thurlow towards the end of his life:

Thurlow was always dressed in a full suit of cloaths of the old fashion, great cuffs and massy buttons, great wig, long ruffles, &c.; the black eyebrows exceeded in size any I have ever seen, and his voice, tho' by no means devoid of melody, was a kind of rolling, murmuring thunder. He had great reading, particularly classical, and was a very distinguished, as well as most daring, converser.

== Personal life ==
Thurlow had a number of illegitimate children Two of his daughters, Caroline and Catharine, had their portrait painted by George Romney in 1783. Catharine, who died in 1826, married Alexander Fraser, 17th Lord Saltoun, in 1815. Another daughter Maria, who died in 1816, married Colonel Sir David Cunynghame of Milncraig, 5th Baronet, in 1801, and had several children.

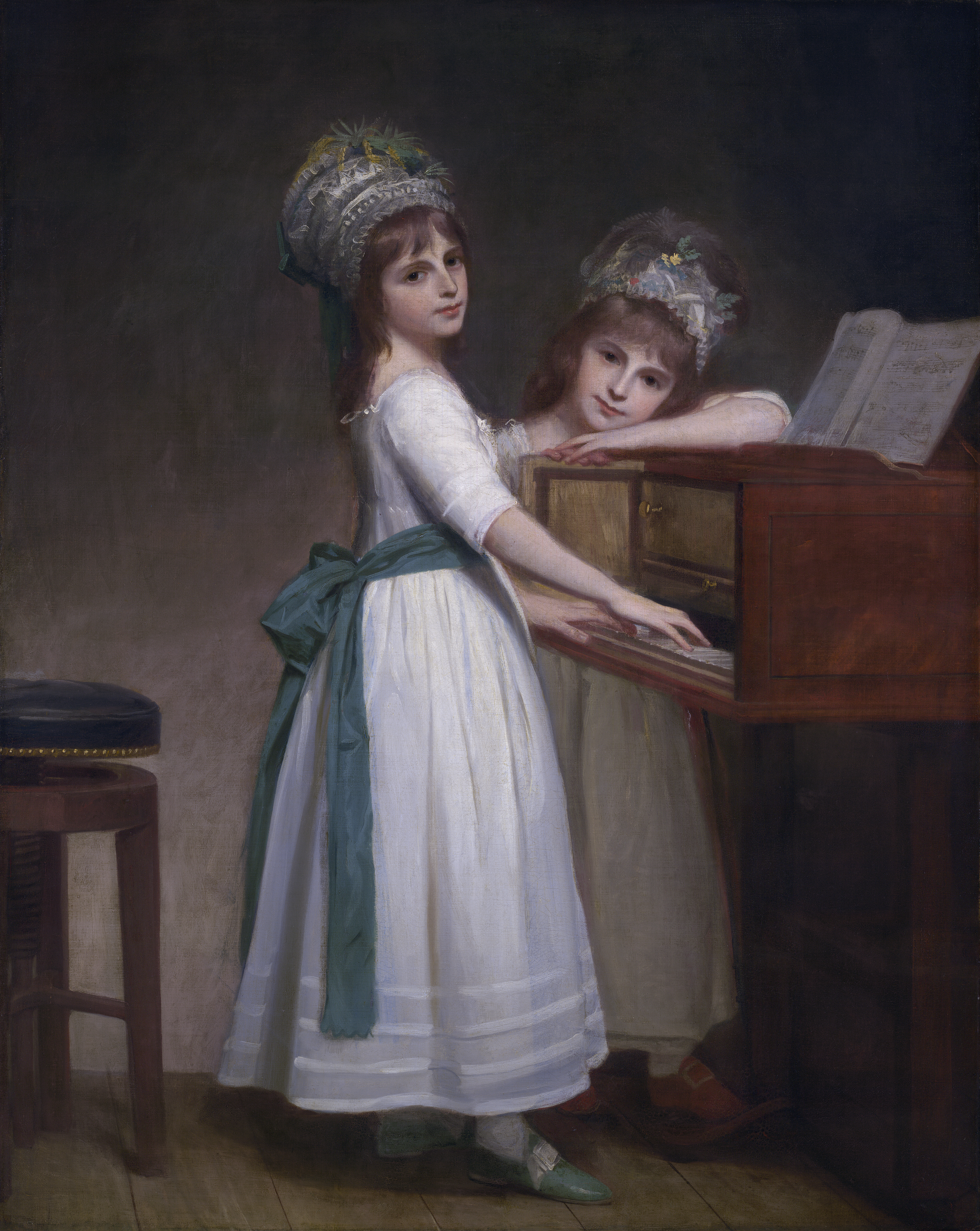
Portrait of Catharine Thurlow (d. 1826) and Caroline Thurlow (b. 1772) (George Romney, 1783)

Lord Thurlow never married, but left three natural daughters. He died at Brighton on 12 September 1806, aged 74, and was buried in the Temple Church. The barony of 1778 became extinct on his death, while he was succeeded in the barony of 1792 according to the special remainder by his nephew Edward, who was the eldest son of the first baron's brother, Right Reverend Thomas Thurlow, Bishop of Durham.

The Life of Miss Anne Catley cites that Edward Thurlow "paid her some occasional visits" but that she was "disappointed; that gentleman already [was] provided with a favourite."

== In popular culture ==
Thurlow appears as a character in Alan Bennett's play The Madness of George III and the subsequent film adaptation, in which he was played by John Wood.

John Poynder's Literary Extracts (1844) attributes to Thurlow the following widely quoted saying:

Corporations have neither bodies to be punished, nor souls to be condemned; they therefore do as they like.

== See also ==
- Honora Jenkins' will

== Bibliography ==
- Rigg, James McMullen (1898). "Thurlow, Edward (1731-1806)" . In Lee, Sidney (ed.). Dictionary of National Biography. Vol. 56. London: Smith, Elder & Co.
- Renton, Alexander Wood (1911). "Thurlow, Edward Thurlow, 1st Baron" . In Chisholm, Hugh (ed.). Encyclopædia Britannica. Vol. 26 (11th ed.). Cambridge University Press. pp. 903–904. Endnotes:
  - Lord Campbell's Lives of the Chancellors, vii. 153–333
  - Foss's Judges of England, viii. 374–385
  - Public Characters (1798)
  - Notes and Queries, 2nd series, vol. iii. p. 283; 3rd series, vol. iii. p. 122
  - Reports of his decisions by Brown, Dickens and Vesey (jun.)
  - Brougham's Statesmen of the Time of George III.
- Ditchfield, G. M. "Thurlow, Edward, first Baron Thurlow (1731–1806)". Oxford Dictionary of National Biography (online ed.). Oxford University Press. doi:10.1093/ref:odnb/27406. (Subscription, Wikipedia Library access or UK public library membership required.)

Parliament of Great Britain
Preceded by Hon. Thomas Villiers; Viscount Villiers	Member of Parliament for Tamworth; 1765–1778; With: Hon. Thomas Villiers to March 1768; William de Grey March–November 1768; Charles Vernon 1768–74; Thomas de Grey from 1774	Succeeded by Thomas de Grey; Anthony Chamier
Legal offices
Preceded by John Dunning	Solicitor General for England and Wales; 1770–1771	Succeeded by Alexander Wedderburn
Preceded by William de Grey	Attorney General for England and Wales; 1771–1778	Succeeded by Alexander Wedderburn
Political offices
Preceded by The Earl Bathurst	Lord High Chancellor of Great Britain; 1778–1783	In commission Title next held by Himself
Preceded by In Commission	Lord High Chancellor of Great Britain; 1783–1792	In commission Title next held by The Lord Loughborough
Preceded by The Earl of Northington	Teller of the Exchequer; 1786–1806	Succeeded by Hon. William Eden
Preceded by —	Lord High Steward; 1788–1792	Succeeded by The Lord Loughborough
Peerage of Great Britain
New creation	Baron Thurlow; 1778–1806	Extinct
New creation	Baron Thurlow; 1792–1806	Succeeded by Edward Hovell-Thurlow
