= Mary Catherine Bolton =

English actress

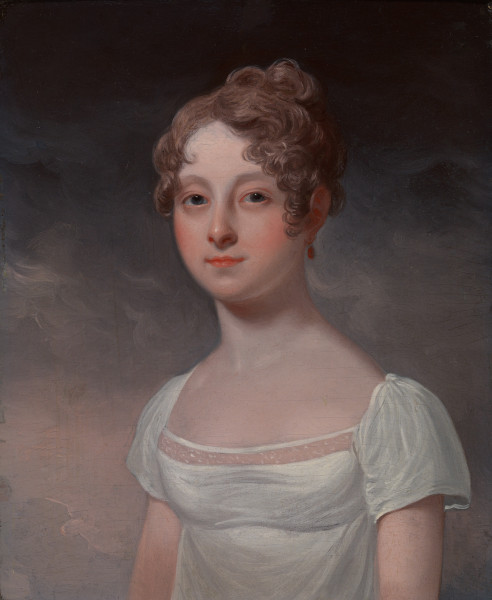
- by Samuel De Wilde and now in the Garrick Club
- Born: 1790/91
- Died: 28 September 1830

Mary Catherine Bolton, stage name Polly Bolton, later known by her married name of Lady Thurlow (1790/91–1830), was an English actress, remembered particularly for playing Ophelia.

== Life ==
Bolton was the daughter of James Richard Bolton, an attorney. She made her first appearance on the stage on 8 October 1801, in The Beggar's Opera as "Miss Bolton"

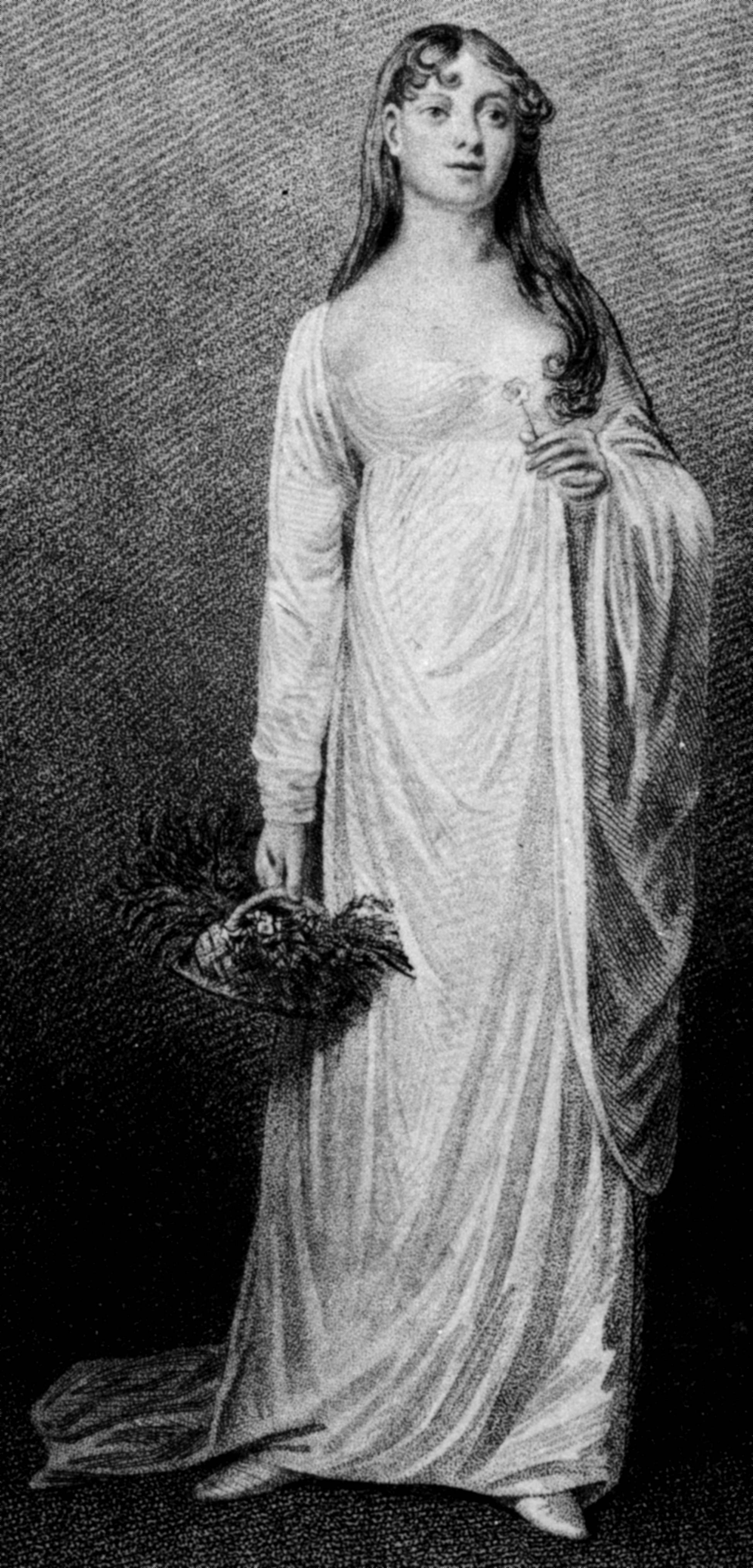
Mary Catherine Bolton as Ophelia in 1813

In 1811, she played the part of Ophelia in Hamlet opposite John Kemble, giving a performance described as "in a decorous style, relying on the familiar images of the white dress, loose hair, and wild flowers, to convey a polite feminine distraction".

On 13 November 1813, at St Martin-in-the-Fields, she married Edward Hovell-Thurlow, 2nd Baron Thurlow (1781–1829), and her stage career ended. They had three sons, including Edward Thomas Hovell-Thurlow, the 3rd Baron. At the time, it would not have been socially possible for a woman who had married into the ruling class to continue a career as an actress.

Her descendant Roualeyn Hovell-Thurlow-Cumming-Bruce, 9th Baron Thurlow, inherited the title in 2013 and in 2015 was elected by his fellow peers to a vacant seat in the House of Lords.

== See also ==
- List of entertainers who married titled Britons
