= Thomas Hovell-Thurlow-Cumming-Bruce, 5th Baron Thurlow =

British politician (1838-1916)

The Right Honourable The Lord Thurlow DL PC
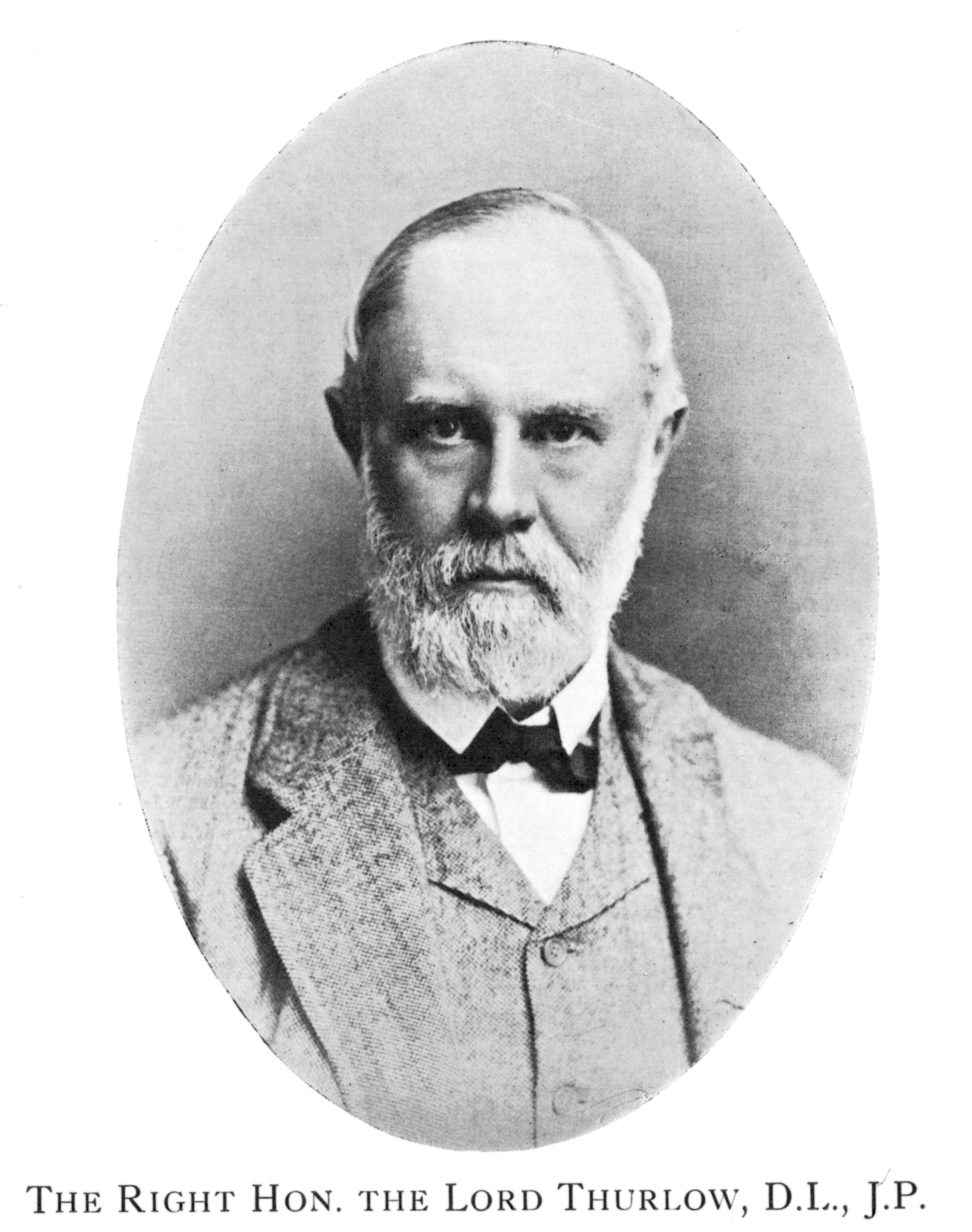
- Lord Thurlow in 1906 or earlier

Paymaster General
- In office 1881–1881
- Preceded by: The Earl Beauchamp
- Succeeded by: The Earl Beauchamp

Thomas John Hovell-Thurlow-Cumming-Bruce, 5th Baron Thurlow, PC, FRS (5 December 1838 – 12 March 1916), was a British Liberal politician who served as Paymaster General in 1886. In 1864, he married Lady Elma Bruce, and later assumed the names of Cumming-Bruce.

== Family ==
Coats of Arms of Thomas Howell-Thurlow-Cumming-Bruce

Thurlow was the younger son of Edward Thomas Hovell-Thurlow, 3rd Baron Thurlow, and a great-grandson of The Right Reverend Thomas Thurlow, Bishop of Durham from 1787 to 1791. Lord Chancellor Edward Thurlow, 1st Baron Thurlow, was his great-great-uncle. In 1864 he married Lady Elma Bruce (d. 1923), daughter of James Bruce, 8th Earl of Elgin. Thurlow assumed in 1873 by royal licence his wife's maiden name of Bruce, and one year later the surname of Cumming as well. On the death of his elder brother in 1874 he succeeded as 5th Baron Thurlow, which gave him a seat in the House of Lords.

== Political career ==
Six years later, in 1880, Lord Thurlow was appointed a Government Whip in the Liberal administration of William Ewart Gladstone. He held this post until 1885, when the Liberals fell from power. When Gladstone returned to power in February 1886, he made Thurlow Paymaster General, which he remained until the Liberals again lost power in August of that year. The same year he was also admitted to the Privy Council.

Lord Thurlow also served as Lord High Commissioner to the General Assembly of the Church of Scotland in 1886. He died on 12 March 1916, aged 77, and was succeeded in the Barony by his son Charles Edward.

Political offices
Preceded by Viscount Enfield	Lord-in-waiting; 1880–1885	Succeeded by The Earl of Hopetoun
Preceded by The Earl Beauchamp	Paymaster General; 1881	Succeeded by The Earl Beauchamp
Peerage of Great Britain
Preceded by Edward Thomas Hovell-Thurlow	Baron Thurlow; 1874–1916	Succeeded by Charles Edward Hovell-Thurlow-Cumming-Bruce
