= Thomas Thurlow (bishop) =

English bishop (1737–1791)

The Right Reverend Thomas Thurlow
- Bishop of Durham
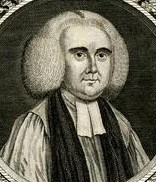
- Diocese: Diocese of Durham
- In office: 1787 – 1791 (death)
- Predecessor: John Egerton
- Successor: Shute Barrington
- Other post: Bishop of Lincoln (1779–1787)

Orders
- Ordination: 1758
- Consecration: 30 May 1779 by Frederick Cornwallis

Personal details
- Born: 1737 Ashfield, Suffolk
- Died: 27 May 1791 Portland Place, Marylebone, Middlesex, Great Britain
- Buried: Temple Church, City of London, Great Britain
- Denomination: Anglican
- Spouse: Anne Beere
- Education: The Queen's College, Oxford; Magdalen College, Oxford

Thomas Thurlow (1737–1791) was an English Anglican bishop who served as Bishop of Lincoln and as Bishop of Durham in the late eighteenth century.

== Life ==
Thurlow was born in 1737 in Ashfield, Suffolk, the second son Thomas Thurlow (died 1762), Rector of Little Ashfield. His older brother was Lord Chancellor Edward, Lord Thurlow.

Coat of Arms of Thomas Thurlow as Bishop of Durham

Thurlow matriculated at The Queen's College, Oxford in 1754, aged 18, but transferred to Magdalen College, Oxford, where he held a demyship 1755–1759 then a fellowship 1759–1772, graduating Bachelor of Arts (BA) 1758, Master of Arts (Oxford) (MA Oxon) 1761, Bachelor of Divinity (BD) 1769, Doctor of Divinity (DD) 1772. He was made deacon on 23 April 1758, by John Thomas (Bishop of Salisbury) at his palace; and ordained priest on 24 December 1758 by Frederick Cornwallis, Bishop of Lichfield and Coventry, at Grosvenor Chapel (on letters dimissory from Salisbury).

He became Rector of Street, Somerset (1769–1770), of Stanhope, County Durham (1770–1771), Master of the Temple in 1772, Dean of Rochester (1775–1779), Bishop of Lincoln in 1779, additionally Dean of St Paul's in commendam in 1782, and was Bishop of Durham from 1787 until his death. His election to Lincoln was confirmed on 29 May 1779 (at St Mary-le-Bow) and he was consecrated a bishop on 30 May 1779 by Cornwallis (then Archbishop of Canterbury) at Lambeth Palace; he was translated to Durham on 10 March 1787, by the confirmation of his election at St Mary-le-Bow.

He died in Portland Place, London, on 27 May 1791, and was buried in Temple Church.

== Legacy ==
His rectum is displayed in the Hunterian Museum in London, with the following description:

"A rectum showing the effects of both haemorrhoids and bowel cancer. The patient in this case was Thomas Thurlow (1737-1791), the Bishop of Durham. Thurlow had suffered from some time from a bowel complaint, which he initially thought was the result of piles. He consulted John Hunter after a number of other physicians and surgeons had failed to provide him with a satisfactory diagnosis. Hunter successfully identified the tumour through rectal examination, but recognised that it was incurable. Thurlow died 10 months later."

== Family ==
Thurlow married Anne Beere, daughter of William Beere. They had the following children:

- Amelia Anne Thurlow (1779–1809), married in 1799 Lieut.-Gen. Sir Edward Howarth KCB
- Edward Hovell-Thurlow (1781–1829), poet, succeeded as 2nd Baron Thurlow in 1806, married in 1813 Mary Catherine Bolton, actress
- Elizabeth Thurlow
- Anne Elizabeth Thurlow (1784–1875), married in 1804 Charles Godfrey
- Rev. Thomas Thurlow (1788–1874), Rector of Boxford, Suffolk, married in 1811 Maria Frances Lyon, daughter of Thomas Lyon MP

== Notes ==
Church of England titles
Preceded by Benjamin Newcombe	Dean of Rochester; 1775–1779	Succeeded by Richard Cust
Preceded by John Green	Bishop of Lincoln; 1779–1787	Succeeded by George Pretyman Tomline
Preceded by Thomas Newton	Dean of St Paul's; 1782–1787	Succeeded by George Pretyman Tomline
Preceded by John Egerton	Bishop of Durham; 1787–1791	Succeeded by Shute Barrington
