= Henry Hovell-Thurlow-Cumming-Bruce, 7th Baron Thurlow =

British peer and British Army officer

Major-General The Right Honourable The Lord Thurlow CB CBE DSO*
- Born: 29 May 1910
- Died: 29 May 1971 (aged 61)
- Military career
- Allegiance: United Kingdom
- Branch: British Army
- Service years: 1930−1964
- Rank: Major-General
- Service number: 47526
- Unit: Seaforth Highlanders
- Commands: 1st Battalion, Gordon Highlanders; 44th Infantry Brigade; 39th Infantry Brigade; 50th (Northumbrian) Infantry Division; British Forces in Malta and Libya
- Conflicts: Second World War
- Awards: Companion of the Order of the Bath; Commander of the Order of the British Empire; Distinguished Service Order & Bar

Major-General Henry Charles Hovell-Thurlow-Cumming-Bruce, 7th Baron Thurlow, CB, CBE, DSO & Bar (29 May 1910 – 29 May 1971) was a British peer and British Army officer.

== Military career ==
Educated at Eton and Royal Military College, Sandhurst, Cumming-Bruce was commissioned as a second lieutenant into the Seaforth Highlanders in 1930. In 1936, he was attached as ADC to the British High Commissioner for Palestine and Transjordan, General Sir Arthur Grenfell Wauchope, and later Sir Harold MacMichael. During the Second World War, Cumming-Bruce served in a number of capacities in Palestine, Eritrea, and Libya, and in 1944 as Lieutenant Colonel commanding 1st Battalion Gordon Highlanders in North-West Europe and then Brigadier commanding 44 Lowland Brigade, during which he received the DSO. In 1945, Cumming-Bruce was appointed a Bar to the DSO, and installed as Commandant of the British Army of the Rhine's Training Centre, from where he saw out the rest of the War.

From 1947 to 1959 he undertook a number of postings as brevet Lieutenant Colonel (1950), Colonel (1952), Brigadier (1958) and then in 1959 Major-General. He succeeded his father as Baron Thurlow in 1952. He served as General Officer Commanding (GOC) 50th (Northumbrian) Infantry Division and Northumbrian Area from 1959 to 1962, and then GOC of British Forces in Malta and Libya, 1962–63, before retiring in 1964.

Harry Thurlow died on his 61st birthday and was succeeded in his Barony by the elder of his two younger twin brothers, Francis, then serving as Governor of the Bahamas.

Military offices
Preceded by William Hulton-Harrop	GOC 50th (Northumbrian) Infantry Division; 1959–1962	Succeeded by Antony Read
Peerage of Great Britain
Preceded by Charles Hovell-Thurlow- Cumming-Bruce	Baron Thurlow; 1952–1971	Succeeded by Francis Hovell-Thurlow- Cumming-Bruce
