= Charles Hovell-Thurlow-Cumming-Bruce, 6th Baron Thurlow =

British peer and minor cleric

Coats of Arms of the Barons Thurlow

Charles Edward Hovell-Thurlow-Cumming-Bruce, 6th Baron Thurlow (6 October 1869 – 23 April 1952), was a British peer and minor cleric.

Educated at Eton and then Trinity College, Cambridge, Thurlow was ordained in 1898 and undertook a number of overseas ministries before returning to the UK as a chaplain to mariners, ultimately as Rural Dean of Liverpool North. He succeeded his father as Baron Thurlow in 1916. Thurlow died in 1952, and was succeeded in the barony by his eldest son, Harry, then serving as a brevet Bt Lt-Col heading the Joint Services Staff College.

Peerage of Great Britain
Preceded by Thomas Hovell-Thurlow- Cumming-Bruce	Baron Thurlow; 1916–1952	Succeeded by Henry Hovell-Thurlow- Cumming-Bruce
